= January 1954 =

Month of 1954

<<	January 1954					>>
Su	Mo	Tu	We	Th	Fr	Sa
					1	2
3	4	5	6	7	8	9
10	11	12	13	14	15	16
17	18	19	20	21	22	23
24	25	26	27	28	29	30
31

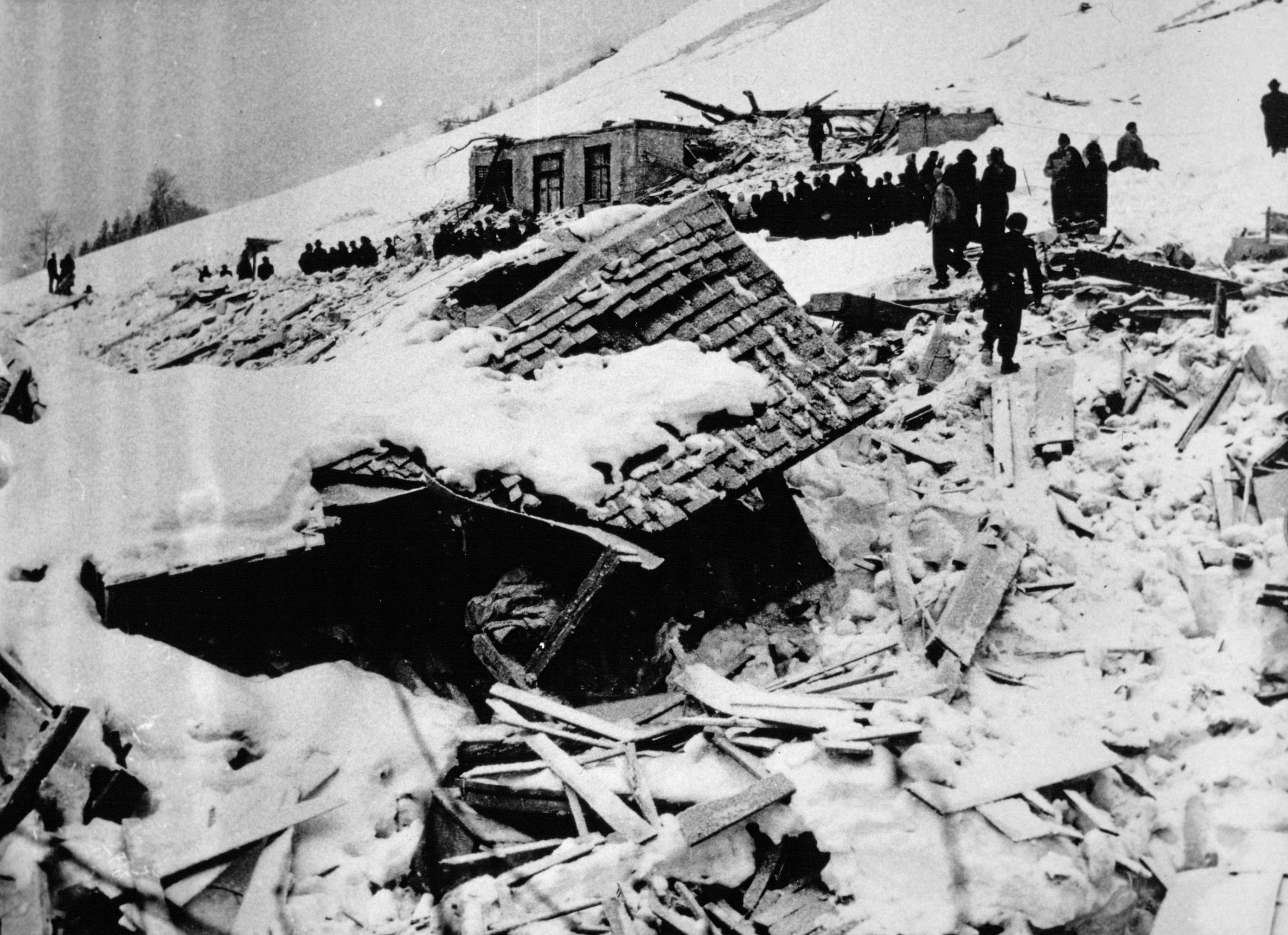
January 12, 1954: Damage from the Blons avalanches in Austria.

The following events occurred in January 1954:

== January 1, 1954 (Friday) ==
- The Soviet Union ceased to demand war reparations from Germany.
- According to a 1953 press statement by Bolesław Bierut, General Secretary of the Polish United Workers' Party, Poland renounced all claims to war reparations from Germany as of January 1, 1954. As of 2022, however, the position of the Polish government is that Poland did not renounce its claim to reparations.
- Died: William Powell, 68, English amateur cricketer

== January 3, 1954 (Sunday) ==
- The Italian broadcaster RAI officially began transmitting.
- In the United States, the last steam-driven passenger train left Washington Union Station for Richmond, Virginia.
- Born: Ned Lamont, American politician, Governor of Connecticut, in Washington, D.C.

== January 4, 1954 (Monday) ==
- Born: Tina Knowles, US fashion designer, in Galveston, Texas

== January 5, 1954 (Tuesday) ==
- Died:
  - Rabbit Maranville, 62, US baseball player (Boston Braves)
  - Lillian Rich, 54, English actress

== January 6, 1954 (Wednesday) ==
- A Royal Air Force Vickers Valetta T3 training aircraft, carrying members of a rugby team, crashed at Albury, Hertfordshire, UK, in bad weather. Two of the 17 people on board were rescued, but only one survived.

== January 7, 1954 (Thursday) ==
- The Georgetown–IBM experiment, the first public demonstration of a machine translation system (from Russian to English), took place in New York.

== January 8, 1954 (Friday) ==
- Died: Eduard Wiiralt, 55, Estonian artist

== January 10, 1954 (Sunday) ==
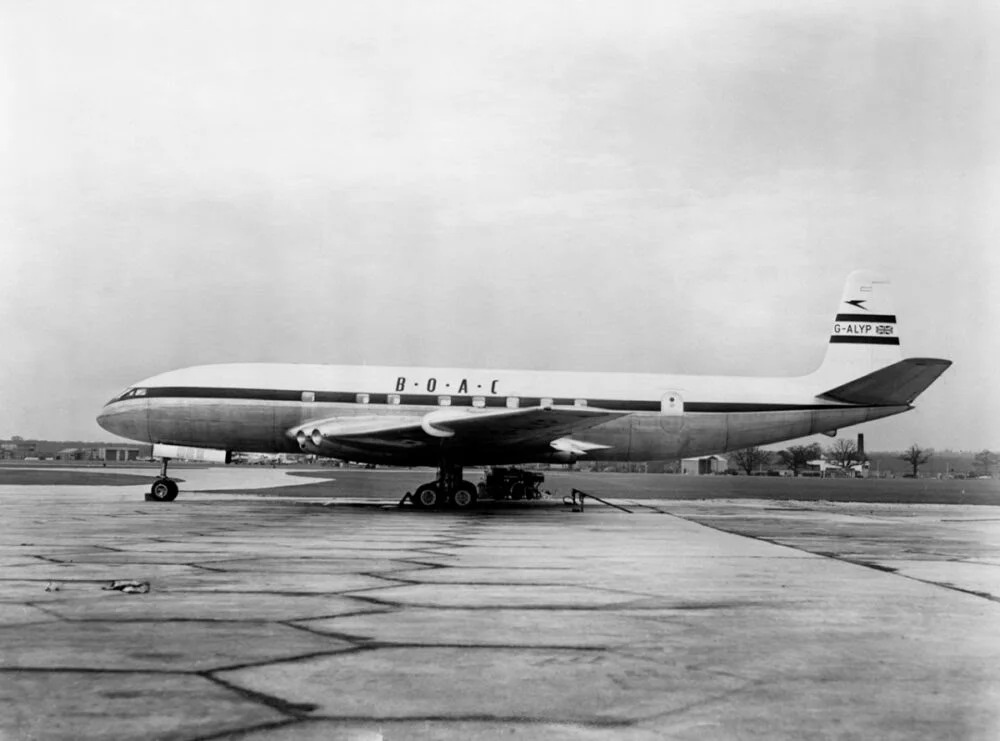
The BOAC Flight 781 accident aircraft

- BOAC Flight 781, a de Havilland Comet jet plane, disintegrated in mid-air due to metal fatigue and crashed in the Mediterranean near Elba, killing all 35 people on board.

== January 11, 1954 (Monday) ==
- Avalanches in Vorarlberg, Austria killed 125 people. The avalanches lasted 2 days.
- Died:
  - John Simon, 1st Viscount Simon, 80, British politician
  - Oscar Straus, 83, Austrian composer

== January 12, 1954 (Tuesday) ==
- Died:
  - William H. P. Blandy, 63, American admiral
  - Elmer H. Geran, 78, American politician

== January 13, 1954 (Wednesday) ==
- Died: George Henry Barnard, QC, 85, Canadian lawyer and Conservative politician

== January 14, 1954 (Thursday) ==
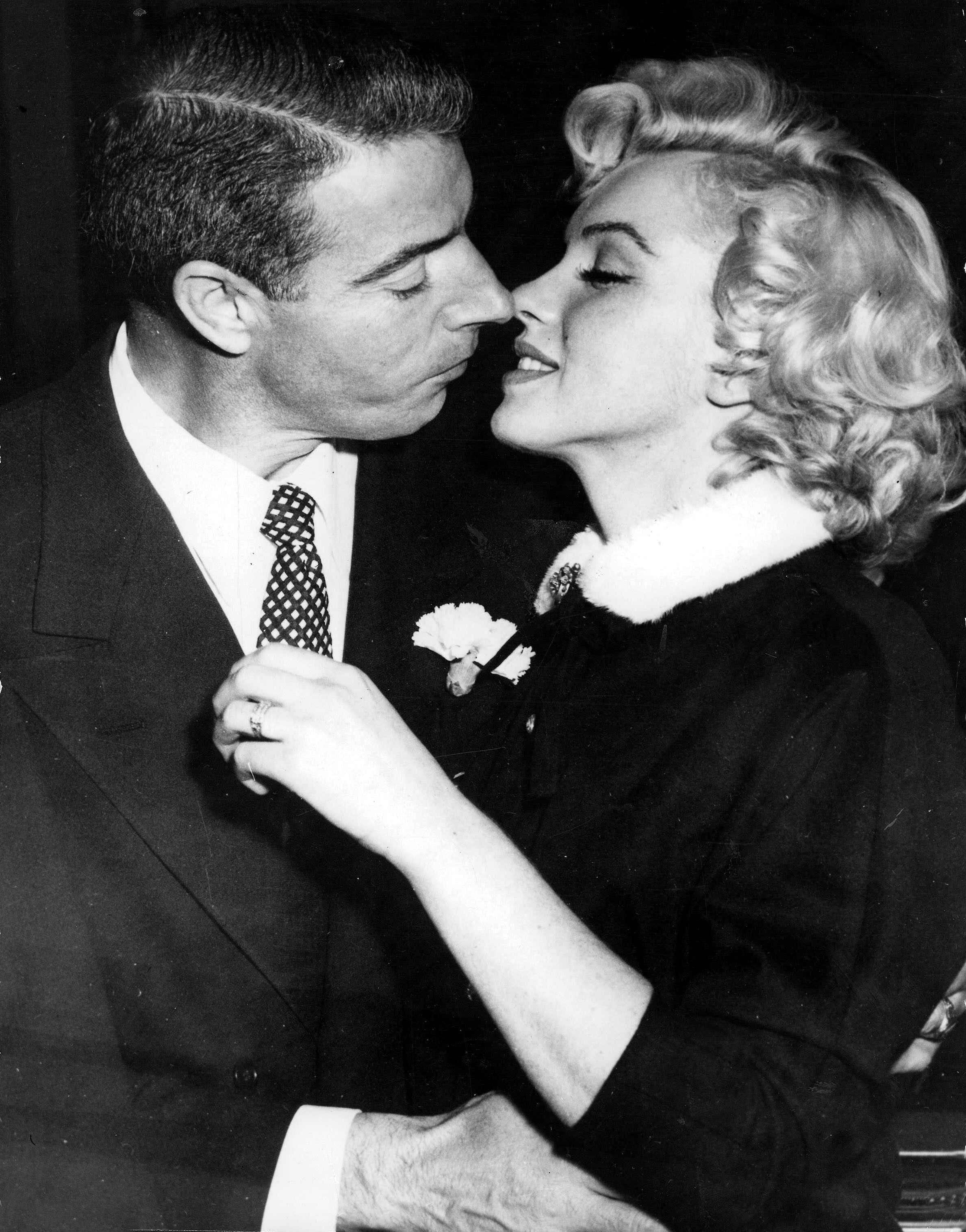
January 1954: Newlyweds Joe DiMaggio and Marilyn Monroe

- Marilyn Monroe married baseball player Joe DiMaggio.
- Born: "Hacksaw" Jim Duggan, American professional wrestler, in Glens Falls, New York

== January 15, 1954 (Friday) ==
- British troops captured Mau Mau leader Waruhiu Itote in Kenya.
- Born: Rashad al-Alimi, Yemeni politician, Chairman of the Presidential Leadership Council, in Taiz Governorate, Yemen

== January 17, 1954 (Sunday) ==
- Milovan Djilas was removed from his position as President of the Federal Assembly of Yugoslavia after 22 days.
- Born: Robert F. Kennedy Jr., American lawyer and activist, 2024 Democratic presidential candidate, in Washington, D.C.

== January 18, 1954 (Monday) ==
- Died: Sydney Greenstreet, 74, English actor

== January 19, 1954 (Tuesday) ==
- A lunar eclipse occurred.
- Born: Yumi Matsutōya, Japanese singer-songwriter, in Hachiōji, suburb of Tokyō

== January 20, 1954 (Wednesday) ==
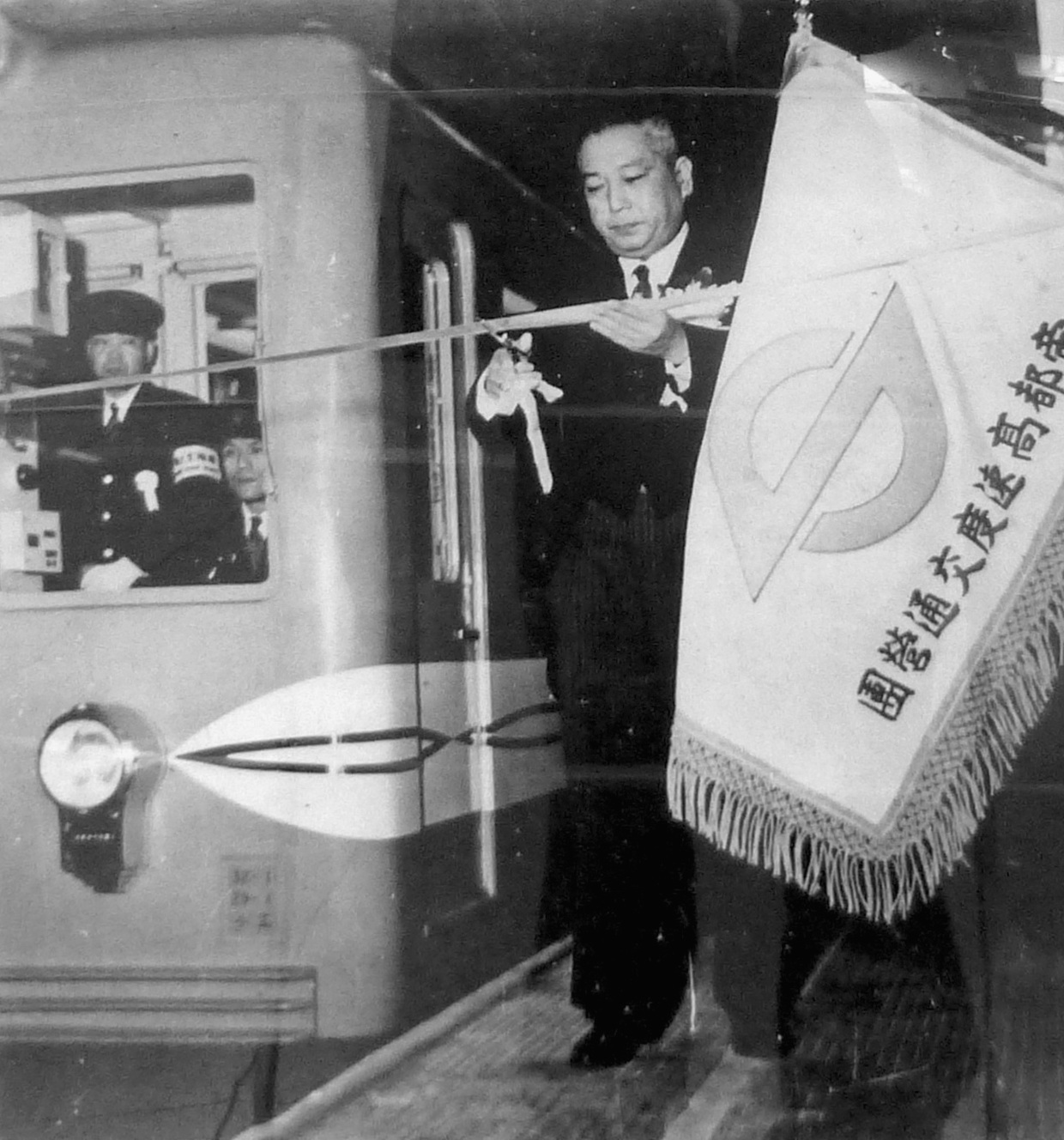
Part of the opening ceremony for the Marunouchi Line at Ikebukuro Station

- The Tokyo Metro Marunouchi Line, the second line in the system and the first built after World War II, was opened between Ikebukuro and Ochanomizu stations.
- Chicago businessman W. Leonard Evans Jr. established the US-based National Negro Network with forty-six member radio stations.
- The coldest temperature recorded in the contiguous United States was recorded at Rogers Pass, Montana. The temperature officially reached -69.7 °F (-56.5 °C) but is often rounded to -70 °F (-56.7 °C).
- Died:
  - Fred Root, 63, English cricketer
  - Walter K. Wilson Sr., 73, United States Army major general

== January 21, 1954 (Thursday) ==
- The first nuclear-powered submarine, the USS Nautilus (SSN-571), was launched in Groton, Connecticut, by First Lady of the United States Mamie Eisenhower.

== January 22, 1954 (Friday) ==
- Died: Princess Margaret of Prussia, 81, granddaughter of Queen Victoria who married Prince Frederick Charles of Hesse and the King-elect of Finland.

== January 24, 1954 (Sunday) ==
- Died: Samuel B. Wilson, 80, American lawyer and judge

== January 25, 1954 (Monday) ==
- The foreign ministers of the United States, the United Kingdom, France and the Soviet Union met at the Berlin Conference, which would last until February 18. Its purpose was to discuss a settlement to the recent Korean War and the ongoing First Indochina War between France and the Viet Minh.

== January 26, 1954 (Tuesday) ==
- Died:
  - Carl Eldh, 80, Swedish artist and sculptor
  - Alexander Wilson, 64, Australian wheat farmer and federal politician

== January 28, 1954 (Thursday) ==
- Born:
  - Bruno Metsu, French football coach (d. 2013)
  - Kaneto Shiozawa, Japanese voice actor (d. 2000)

== January 29, 1954 (Friday) ==
- Born:
  - Christian Bjelland IV, Norwegian businessman and art collector
  - Terry Kinney, American actor and director
  - Oprah Winfrey, American talk show host, actress, and producer, founded Harpo Productions
  - Yukinobu Hoshino, Japanese cartoonist

== January 30, 1954 (Saturday) ==
- Died:
  - John Murray Anderson, 67, Canadian theater director and producer
  - Dorothy Price, 63, Irish physician, stroke
  - Henry Braid Wilson, 92, United States Navy admiral

== January 31, 1954 (Sunday) ==
- Died:
  - Florence Bates, 65, American actress
