= Bousfield =

Bousfield is a surname, and may refer to:

- Aldridge Bousfield (1941–2020), American mathematician and writer
- Henry Brougham Bousfield (1832–1902), colonial Anglican priest and Bishop of Pretoria
- Ian Bousfield (born 1964), British trombonist
- John Keith Bousfield (1893–1945), British army officer, businessman and member of the Legislative Council of Hong Kong
- Ken Bousfield (1919–2000), British golfer
- Lauren Bousfield (1981–Current), American musician
- Maudelle Brown Bousfield (1885–1971), American educator
- Midian Othello Bousfield (1885–1948), American physician
- Nathaniel Bousfield (1829–1883), English MP
- Weston Bousfield (1904–1986), American psychologist and professor
- William Robert Bousfield (1854–1943), British lawyer, politician and scientist
