= Edison/Fareira High School =

Thomas Edison/Fareira High School

Location
- 151 W Luzerne St; Philadelphia, Pennsylvania 19140; United States; 40°00′44″N 75°07′45″W

Information
- Type: Public high school
- Motto: Integrating Learning for Success
- Established: 1903
- School district: School District of Philadelphia
- Principal: Lillian Izzard
- Staff: 72.40 (FTE)
- Grades: 9–12
- Enrollment: 887 (2023-2024)
- Student to teacher ratio: 12.25
- Color
- Mascot: Owl
- Yearbook: The Edisonian
- Website: Edison/Fareira High School

Thomas Alva Edison and John C. Fareira High School is a high school serving grades 9-12 on 151 West Luzerne Street, Philadelphia, Pennsylvania. It is part of the School District of Philadelphia.

The school serves several neighborhoods in North Philadelphia, including Fairhill, Franklinville, and Hunting Park.

== History ==
The original Edison High School building was opened in 1903 as the all-male Northeast Manual Training High School located at 8th Street and Lehigh Avenue, which eventually became Northeast High School. New additions, such as the auditorium and vocational education shops, were added over the next three decades. Northeast High School reopened at a new location in 1957, and Thomas Alva Edison High School was opened at the site. The school remained all-male until the beginning of the 1979 school year. The school was 80% African-American, 10% Anglo White, and 10% Puerto Rican in 1970.

In 1988, the original school was relocated and replaced by a co-educational Edison/Fareira High School, named in part for its late principal, John C. Fareira. The new Edison/Fareira is a combined academic high school and vocational skills center. It is located at Front and Luzerne Streets with an outdoor athletic facility on the same site.

The school lost 64 former students during the Vietnam War, more than any other U.S. high school. Every year the "64" are honored in a special ceremony to remember their sacrifice which includes attendance of veterans, faculty, students, community and some of the family members of the students who lost their lives.

The graduating class of 1965 is believed to have suffered an unusually high number of casualties in the Vietnam war and was the subject of the 1995 documentary Yearbook: The Class of '65, directed by Stephen Jimenez.

The previous building at 8th Street and Lehigh Avenue had been vacant since 2002 and was sold to developers. The building was heavily damaged by fire on August 3, 2011.

== Curriculum ==
Tenth graders select one trade area for concentration study through their senior year. A complete academic program leading to a high school diploma is required of each student. In addition, each student must complete a required sequence of career and technical courses. Each student also has the opportunity to participate in a full program of extra-curricular activities.

The overall program at Career and Technical Education (CTE) programs comprises twelve career and technical areas of study and a comprehensive academic program. Edison/Fareira Skills High School CTE students participate in school-to-career experiences, including opportunities for work-based learning in the 11th and 12th grades.

Some of the CTE offerings available to students include:

- Automobile/Automotive Mechanics Technology
- Child Care and Support Services Management
- Cinematography and Film/Video Production
- Commercial/Advertising Art
- Cosmetology
- Culinary
- Electrical and Power Transmission
- Health Related Technology
- Plumbing
- Warehousing Technology
- Welding Technology

== Feeder schools ==
- Aspira Charter School at John B. Stetson
- Cayuga School
- Roberto Clemente School
- Julia de Burgos School
- Lewis Elkin School
- Alexander K. McClure School
- Luis Muñoz Marin School
- Bayard Taylor School
- Potter Thomas School
