= Len Evans =

Len Evans may refer to:

- Len Evans (footballer) (1903–1977), Welsh international football goalkeeper
- Len Evans (wine) (1930–2006), Australian wine columnist
- Leonard Evans (1929–2016), Canadian politician
- W. Leonard Evans Jr., African American businessman
