= Federal Detention Center, Philadelphia =

American federal prison

Coordinates: 39.9529°N 75.1515°W

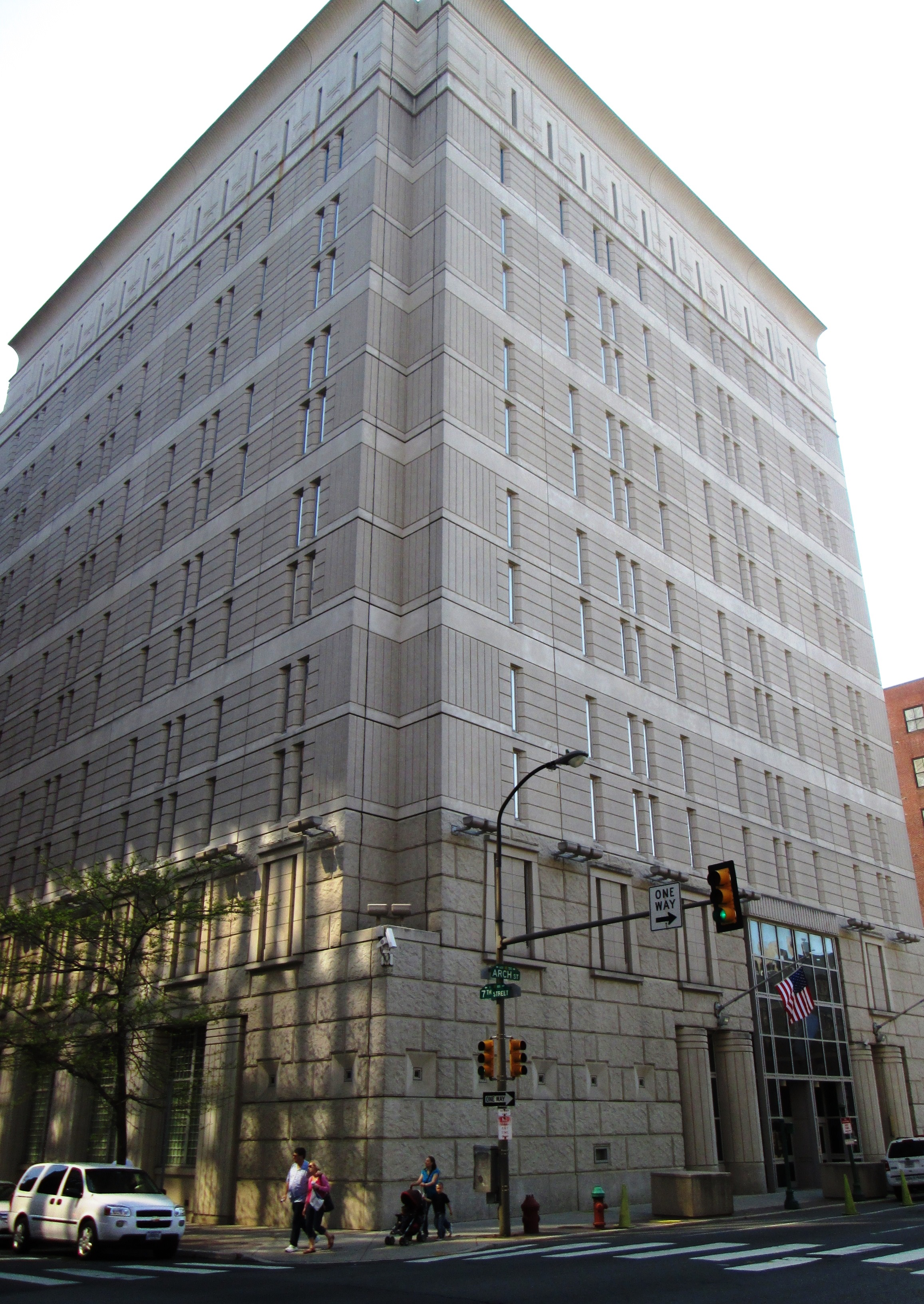
- Federal Detention Center, Philadelphia in April 2013
- Interactive map of Federal Detention Center, Philadelphia
- Location: 700 Arch Street, Philadelphia, Pennsylvania, U.S.
- Status: Operational
- Security class: Administrative facility (all security levels)
- Population: 1,030
- Opened: January 1, 2000
- Managed by: Federal Bureau of Prisons
- Warden: J.L. Jamison

The Federal Detention Center, Philadelphia (FDC Philadelphia or FDC Philly) is a federal prison in the Center City neighborhood of Philadelphia, Pennsylvania, United States. It mostly holds pretrial male and female inmates as well as inmates serving brief sentences or those that are being transported to another prison within the federal prison system. It is operated by the Federal Bureau of Prisons, a division of the United States Department of Justice.

The jail, across from the William J. Green Jr. Federal Building, is on a 1-acre (0.40 ha) site the southwest corner of Arch Street and 7th Street, across from the African American Museum in Philadelphia and in the Independence Mall area.

The jail is 12 stories tall across eight floors and multiple basements. It has 628 cells for United States Marshal Service pre-trial inmates, primarily from the Eastern District of Pennsylvania, the District of New Jersey and the District of Delaware. Federal Detention Center Philadelphia is also a United States Parole Commission Revocation Site. Upwards of 120 female prisoners, already sentenced, serve as work cadre inmates. The prison is connected to a tunnel that allows inmates and US Deputy Marshals to travel to and from the James A. Byrne United States Courthouse.

== History ==
The proposal to build the jail at its current site, which at the time was a mostly vacant plot of land, was made public in February 1992. The museum, the businesses at the East Market Street, Chinatown businesses, and U.S. House of Representatives member Thomas Foglietta all opposed the proposal. The East Market Street businesses did not want prisoners close to their businesses. The African-American museum objected to a reminder of the incarceration of black men. Chinatown businesses stated that the prison may drive away customers and block expansion of Chinatown from the Vine Street Expressway.

In February 1992, The Philadelphia Inquirer reported that the tunnel directly connecting the jail with the courthouse "appeared to appease nearly every critic" against the prison's construction, and that the prison did not visually appear like one.

In August 1992, The Philadelphia Inquirer reported that the jail could damage efforts to revitalize portions of Center City.

As of April 1993, prior to the opening of the detention center, there were 18 federal prisons throughout the U.S. that housed pretrial inmates awaiting proceedings in Philadelphia. FDC Philadelphia, scheduled to cost $85 million, was built so the pretrial federal inmates could be housed in Philadelphia itself.

The federal government pursued building the prison at its selected site, with the legal processes for condemning structures on the site and acquiring the site beginning in March 1995 and with groundbreaking at a former parking lot on the tract in January 1997. Its formal opening was scheduled for June 1, 2000. Its ultimate construction cost was $68 million. 120 prisoners whose sentences were about to end served as a work cadre from April 1 until the prison's opening.

== Facility ==
Each 96-square-foot (8.9 m^{2}) prison cell has slit windows, a bunk bed, a toilet, twin lockers, a writing table, a basin, and drains at the perimeters. The prison includes a caged recreation area with basketball and handball facility. The prison has facilities for reheating meals meant to be served to prisoners.

== Notable incidents ==
- On September 13, 2011, the former warden of FDC Philadelphia, Troy Levi, was indicted by a federal grand jury on multiple charges of obstruction of justice, witness tampering, and making false statements to federal officials. The incident described in the indictment details a situation whereupon a staff member at the FDC accidentally brought a firearm into the facility in violation of federal law. Levi attempted to obstruct justice by inducing the employee to lie about why he brought the firearm to work and instructing him to create a cover story by obtaining a false receipt from a mechanic to establish that the employee's car trunk was broken so he intended to bring the firearm into the facility to secure it in a weapons container. Levi eventually pleaded guilty to six federal charges and was sentenced to four months of home confinement, supervised release, and a fine.
- On March 19, 2012, Richard Spisak, 35, pleaded guilty to engaging in a sexual act with a male prisoner over whom he had disciplinary authority while Spisak was a Senior Corrections Specialist at FDC Philadelphia in 2010. Spisak further admitted to threatening to set off his body alarm and falsely report that the inmate had attacked him if the inmate did not perform oral sex on him. The victim acquiesced after Spisak's threats. Two other inmates testified at Spisak's sentencing hearing that Spisak victimized them in a similar manner. Spisak was sentenced to 32 months in federal prison on June 28, 2012.
- On May 10, 2023, inmate Kevante Washington was severely beaten, presumably by another inmate, while housed in the FDC Philadelphia Special Housing Unit. A day later, he succumbed to his injuries. As of August 2023, no charges have been filed and the investigation remains ongoing.
- On January 9, 2026, Parady La, 46, an ICE detainee housed at FDC Philadelphia died. La was found unresponsive in his cell on January 7 and received CPR and was administered NARCAN before being transported to Thomas Jefferson University Hospital by EMS at 2:38 p.m. La remained in the hospital's Neuro Intensive Care Unit in critical condition for 2 days before being declared brain dead on January 9 at 3:22 a.m. La's family intends to pursue legal action against FDC Philadelphia and ICE.

== Notable inmates (current and former) ==
Inmate Name	Register Number	Photo	Status	Details
Shain Duka	61284-066		Transferred to USP Atwater. Serving a life sentence plus 30 years.	Involved in the 2007 Fort Dix attack plot; convicted in 2008 of conspiring to kill American soldiers and possessing firearms with the intent to conduct a terrorist attack at the New Jersey military base.
Dritan Duka	61285-066		Transferred to USP Canaan. Serving a life sentence plus 30 years.	Involved in the 2007 Fort Dix attack plot; convicted in 2008 of conspiring to kill American soldiers and possessing firearms with the intent to conduct a terrorist attack at the New Jersey military base.
Eljvir Duka	61282-066		Transferred to USP Coleman. Serving a life sentence plus 30 years.	Involved in the 2007 Fort Dix attack plot; convicted in 2008 of conspiring to kill American soldiers and possessing firearms with the intent to conduct a terrorist attack at the New Jersey military base.
Kimberly Jones	56198-054		Served 11 months; released from custody on August 2, 2006.	Rapper and actress known as Lil' Kim; convicted of conspiracy and perjury in 2005 for lying to a federal grand jury about her and her friends' involvement in a 2001 shootout in New York City, during which a bystander was wounded.
Barry Croft	11796-509		Transferred to ADX Florence. Serving a 19-year and seven-month sentence; scheduled for release on June 15, 2037.	Participant in the 2020 failed plot to kidnap Michigan Governor Gretchen Whitmer. Croft was convicted in 2022 of conspiracy to kidnap, conspiracy to use weapons of mass destruction, and possession of homemade explosives.
Kaboni Savage	58232-066		Transferred to ADX Florence. Serving a life sentence; originally sentenced to death.	Drug kingpin who ordered the firebombing of an informant's house, killing six people. He was also convicted of six additional murders. Savage was originally given thirteen death sentences: one for each murder, plus one for witness intimidation relating to the fire. Savage was one of the 37 federal death row prisoners whose sentences were commuted to life by President Joe Biden on December 23, 2024.
Abdul Ibrahim West	76811-066		Transferred to USP Big Sandy. Serving a 45-year sentence; scheduled for release on April 15, 2056.	Rapper known as AR-Ab; convicted in 2019 on conspiracy and drug trafficking charges for running a drug ring in North Philadelphia.
Drew Drechsel	73733-018		Transferred to FCI Milan. Serving a 10-year sentence; scheduled for release on March 7, 2029.	American Ninja Warrior winner; pleaded guilty on June 1, 2023 to one count of receiving child pornography and one count of knowingly persuading, inducing, enticing and coercing a minor to travel interstate to engage in sexual activity.
Clare Bronfman	91010-053		Transferred to a halfway house in May 2024; released from custody on June 27, 2025.	Executive board member of NXIVM, a cult which recruited women to serve as sex slaves to its leader Keith Raniere. Bronfman pleaded guilty to identity fraud and conspiracy to harbor illegal immigrants for financial gain, and in 2020 was sentenced to seven years in prison.

== See also ==
- Federal Bureau of Prisons
- Incarceration in the United States
- List of U.S. federal prisons
