= Marsha Perelman =

Philadelphia businesswoman and philanthropist

- Born: Marsha Reines; Canton, Ohio
- Education: Northwestern University (B. Sc) and University of Pennsylvania (Masters)
- Occupations: Businesswoman, civic leader, philanthropist, investor,
- Spouse: Jeffrey Perelman
- Children: 1

Marsha Perelman née Reines is a businesswoman and philanthropist from Philadelphia.

== Early life and education ==
She was born in Canton, Ohio. She graduated from Northwestern University with a BA and received her master’s degree from the University of Pennsylvania.

== Career ==
Perelman started her career in the energy business at Buckeye Pipe Line Company as one of the company’s first female executives, followed by co-founding Clearfield Energy and serving on the boards of two NYSE energy companies: Penn Virginia Corporation, and PVR Partners, L.P. (NYSE:PVR) prior to its acquisition.

Perelman worked in the energy industry for over 30 years with companies including Buckeye Pipe Line; Clearfield Energy, of which she was a founder; O'Brien Philadelphia Cogen, which she acquired from O'Brien Energy; and Sempra Energy.

== Philanthropy ==
She is chair emerita of the board of trustees of the Franklin Institute, helping to build the organization into one of the premier science centers during her eight-year tenure as board chair. She led the Institute’s Inspire Science campaign, raising $65.2 million for projects including the construction of the Nicholas and Athena Karabots Pavilion, a 53,000-foot addition.

Currently she serves as chair of Calder Gardens, set to open in 2025, which will highlight the sculptures and paintings of the Philadelphia artist Alexander Calder.

She is active locally and nationally on animal welfare issues; she served as chair of the American Society for the Prevention of Cruelty to Animals, is a founding Board member of Project Chimps, co-chair of ACCT Philly and a member of the Pennsylvania Dog Law Advisory Board, where she led the effort to pass Pennsylvania’s first puppy mill law. She was previously on the board of directors and vice chair of the Humane Society of the United States.

Named one of Philadelphia's top 100 connectors by Leadership Philadelphia, she previously also served as chair of the Philadelphia Community Advisory Council of the Knight Foundation and was on the board of directors of the Greater Philadelphia Tourism Marketing Corporation (Visit Philadelphia), the Hirshhorn Museum and Sculpture Garden, the Bryn Mawr Film Institute, the fund for the school district where she served as vice chair, and the Philadelphia Zoo, where she served as acting president and CEO before returning to the board as vice chair.

Perelman served on the Board of Directors of the Free Library of Philadelphia in 2019.

In 2023, Perelman was one of ten women named to the Distinguished Daughters of Pennsylvania Class of 2023 in recognition of her service and contributions to Pennsylvania.

== Personal life ==
She and her husband Jeffrey E. Perelman live in Wynnewood, Pennsylvania. They have a daughter, Ali Perelman.

They were named a top 200 collector by ARTnews.
