= December 1953 =

Month of 1953

<<	December 1953					>>
Su	Mo	Tu	We	Th	Fr	Sa
		1	2	3	4	5
6	7	8	9	10	11	12
13	14	15	16	17	18	19
20	21	22	23	24	25	26
27	28	29	30	31

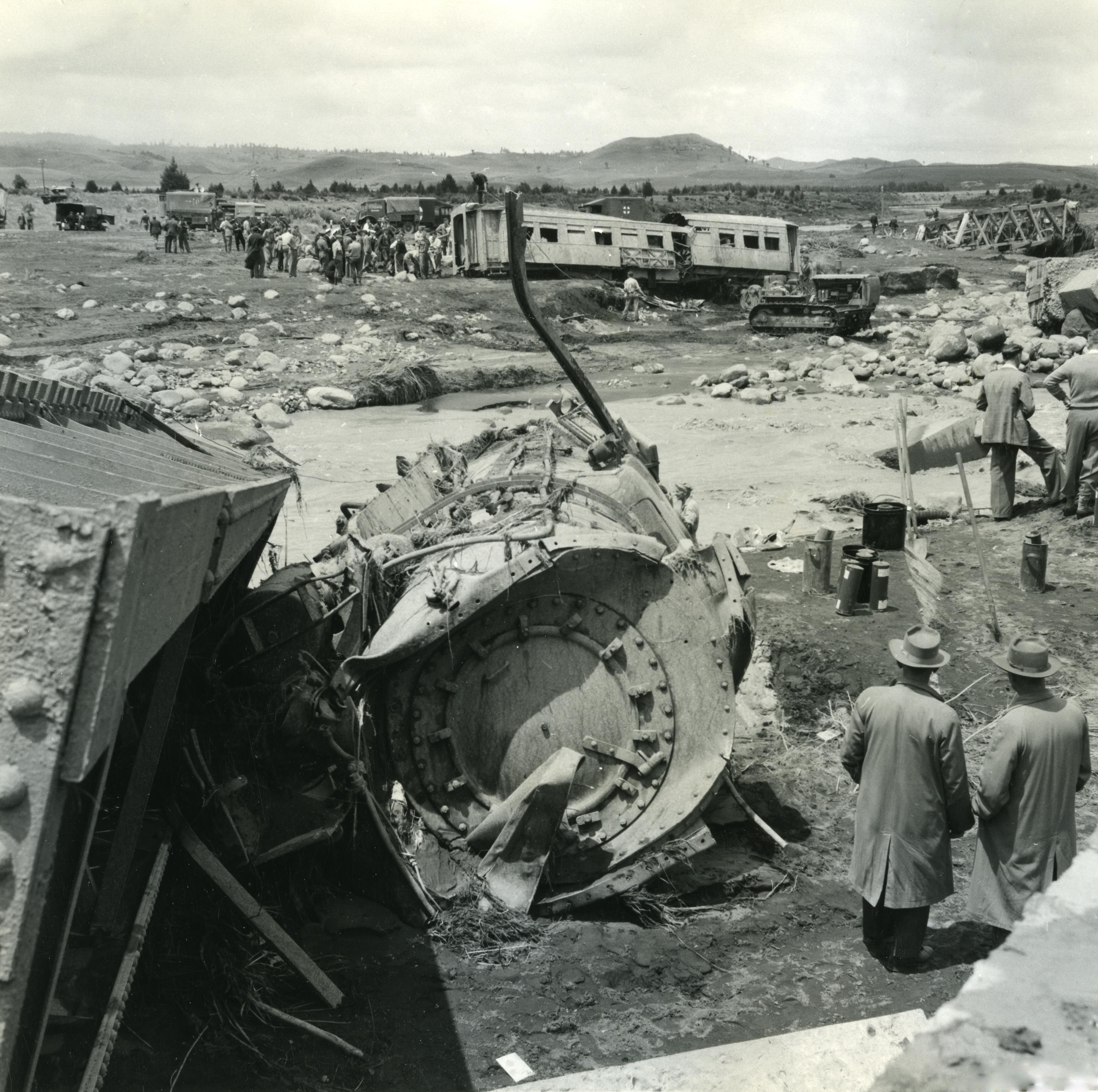
December 25, 1953: Aftermath of the Tangiwai disaster

The following events occurred in December 1953:

== December 1, 1953 (Tuesday) ==
- Born: Victor Ambros, American developmental biologist and Nobel Laureate, in Hanover, New Hampshire, United States

== December 2, 1953 (Wednesday) ==
- The United Kingdom and Iran reformed diplomatic relations.
- Died: Tran Trong Kim, 70, Vietnamese historian and Prime Minister of the Empire of Vietnam

== December 3, 1953 (Thursday) ==
- 2 miles (3.2 km) off Miami Beach, Florida, 52-year-old American attorney Hope Root died in an attempt to set a new deep diving record of 410 feet (120 m). Root descended to 500 feet (150 m) and did not resurface.

== December 4, 1953 (Friday) ==
- A Federal grand jury indicted University of Chicago economist Val R. Lorwin on three counts of perjury in denying any Communist affiliation to State Department investigators in December 1950.
- Born:
  - Jean-Pierre Darroussin, French actor and filmmaker, in Courbevoie
  - Rick Middleton, Canadian National Hockey League player, in Toronto
  - Jean-Marie Pfaff, Belgian professional footballer, in Lebbeke, East Flanders
- Died:
  - Curio Barbasetti di Prun, 68, Italian World War II general
  - Mario Gestri, 29, Italian road cyclist, died in a motorcycle accident.
  - Daniel Gregory Mason, 80, American composer and music critic

== December 5, 1953 (Saturday) ==
- A violent F5 tornado devastated parts of Vicksburg, Mississippi.
- Died: Allen Wardwell, 80, American attorney

== December 6, 1953 (Sunday) ==
- With the NBC Symphony Orchestra, conductor Arturo Toscanini performed what he claimed to be his favorite Beethoven symphony, the Eroica, for the last time. The live performance was broadcast nationwide on radio, and later released on records and CD.

== December 7, 1953 (Monday) ==
- A visit to Iran by U.S. Vice President Richard Nixon sparked several days of riots, as a reaction to the August 19 overthrow of the government of Mohammad Mosaddegh by the U.S.-backed Shah. Three students were shot dead by police in Tehran. This event would become an annual commemoration, Student Day.

== December 8, 1953 (Tuesday) ==
- U.S. President Dwight D. Eisenhower delivered his Atoms for Peace address to the United Nations General Assembly in New York City.
- Born: Kim Basinger, American film actress, in Athens, Georgia

== December 9, 1953 (Wednesday) ==
- Born:
  - John Malkovich, American actor, in Christopher, Illinois
  - Hiromitsu Ochiai, Japanese baseball player and manager

== December 10, 1953 (Thursday) ==
- The Nobel Prizes were awarded in Stockholm, Sweden. Frits Zernike of the Netherlands won for Physics, Hermann Staudinger of West Germany for Chemistry, Hans Adolf Krebs of England and Fritz Albert Lipmann of the United States for Physiology or Medicine, and Sir Winston Leonard Spencer Churchill of England for Literature. In Oslo, Norway, Albert Schweitzer of France was awarded the Peace Prize.
- Died: Franklin D'Olier, 76, American businessman, first national commander of the American Legion

== December 12, 1953 (Saturday) ==
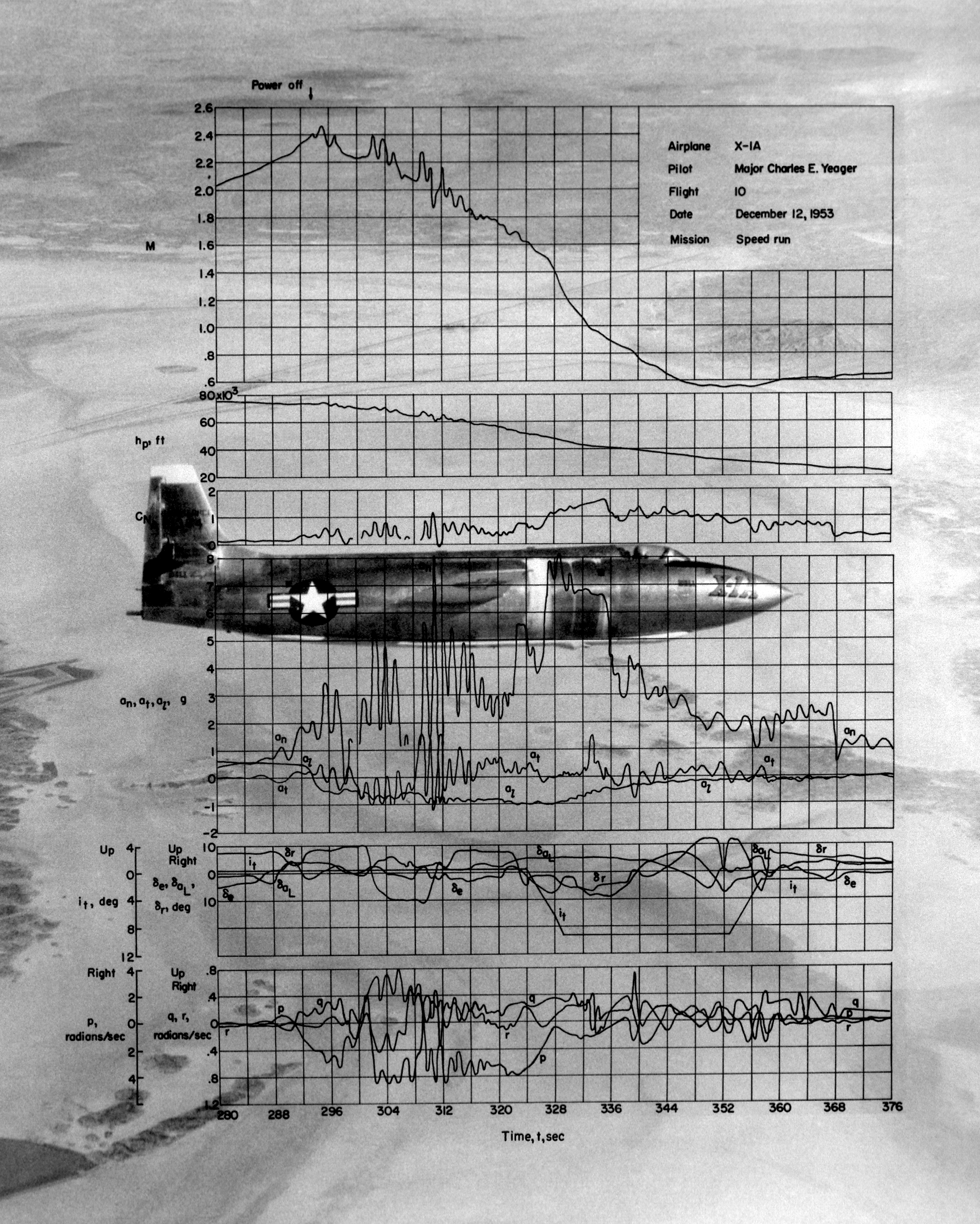
X-1A in flight with flight data superimposed

- U.S. Air Force test pilot Chuck Yeager set a new flight airspeed record of Mach 2.435 (1,618 miles per hour (2,604 km/h)) in the Bell X-1A experimental aircraft at Edwards Air Force Base. During the flight, Yeager lost control of the aircraft, which tumbled nearly 50,000 feet (15,000 m) in 70 seconds before Yeager regained control at 25,000 feet (7,600 m).
- J. Robert Oppenheimer received an honorary Doctor of Science degree from Oxford University.
- An earthquake centered in the northwestern offshore area of Tumbes, Peru caused six deaths.
- A new terminal designed by Carroll, Grisdale & Van Alen was dedicated at Philadelphia International Airport.
- Former child star Freddie Bartholomew married television personality Aileen Paul. The couple would divorce in 1977.
- A human crush at the Shrine of the Virgin of Guadalupe in Mexico City killed four people and injured 1,000.
- Died:
  - Mikhail Dratvin, 56, Soviet lieutenant general
  - Karin Stephen (born Catherine Elizabeth Costelloe), 64, British psychoanalyst and psychologist, died by suicide.
  - Morgan Wallace (born Maier Weill), 72, American actor

== December 13, 1953 (Sunday) ==
- Born: Ben Bernanke, American economist, in Augusta, Georgia, United States
- Died: Guy Weadick, 68, American cowboy, founder of the Calgary Stampede

== December 14, 1953 (Monday) ==
- Died: Sir Maneckji Byramji Dadabhoy, KCSI, KCIE, 88, Indian lawyer and industrialist, President of the Council of State (1933-1946)

== December 15, 1953 (Tuesday) ==
- Born: Nawaf Salam, Lebanese politician and judge, Prime Minister of Lebanon (2025-present), in Beirut
- Died:
  - Ed Barrow, 85, American Major League Baseball manager and front office executive, died from a malignancy.
  - George White, 81, American politician, former Governor of Ohio
  - Michael J. Kernan, 69, American politician, former member of the New York State Senate
  - Robert Stangland, 72, American Olympic athlete and consulting engineer
  - Alfred Lee Wyman, 79, judge of the United States District Court for the District of South Dakota

== December 16, 1953 (Wednesday) ==
- The CinemaScope adventure film Beneath the 12-Mile Reef, directed by Robert D. Webb and released by 20th Century Fox, received its world premiere in New York City.

== December 17, 1953 (Thursday) ==
- The U.S. Federal Communications Commission (FCC) approved color television (using the NTSC standard).
- A Lockheed P2V Neptune with nine crew aboard was reported missing and presumed down in the North Atlantic. Wreckage of the patrol bomber was sighted on Myrdalsjokull Glacier with at least three survivors on 18 December. The plane had departed from Keflavik Airport. The 53d Air Rescue Squadron flew in an Icelandic ground rescue party, including expert skiers, to an airfield at the foot of the glacier. The wreckage was at the 4,000-foot (1,200 m) level. Efforts to reach the crash site were hampered for several days by blizzards and high winds. When the site was reached on 21 December, all nine crew were dead and supplies dropped within 100 yards (91 m) of the wreckage four days before were untouched.

== December 19, 1953 (Saturday) ==
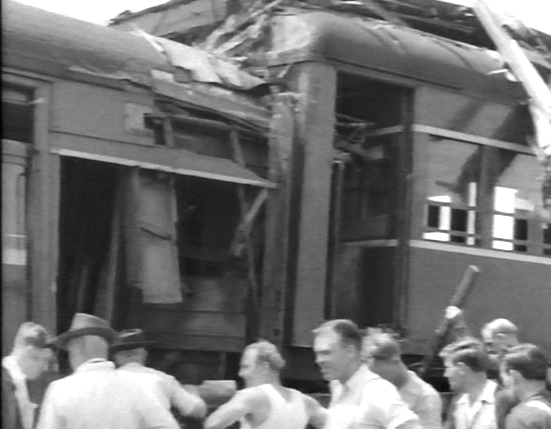
Aftermath of the Sydenham rail disaster

- A train crash in Sydenham, New South Wales, killed five people and injured 748.
- The Bridgeport Harbor Light, built in 1851, caught fire and was destroyed while being dismantled to be replaced by an electric beacon. A bonfire burning unsalvageable wood ignited the fire that destroyed the lighthouse.
- Died:
  - Robert Millikan, 85, American physicist and Nobel laureate
  - Vincent P. Burke CBE, 75, Newfoundland educator, member of the Senate of Canada
  - Ellsworth Faris, 79, American sociologist

== December 20, 1953 (Sunday) ==
- Died:
  - King O'Malley, 95, American-born Australian politician
  - William Bernard Ziff Sr., 55, American publishing executive and author, died of a heart attack.

== December 23, 1953 (Wednesday) ==
- Former Soviet politician and NKVD chief Lavrentiy Beria was “tried by special session” by the Supreme Court of the Soviet Union, convicted of treason, terrorism, and counter revolutionary activity, and executed by firing squad.
- Born: John Callahan, American soap opera actor, in Brooklyn, New York City (d. 2020)
- Died: Lavrentiy Beria, 54, Soviet politician and NKVD chief, executed by firing squad

== December 24, 1953 (Thursday) ==
- Tangiwai disaster: A railway bridge collapsed at Tangiwai, New Zealand, sending a fully loaded passenger train into the Whangaehu River; 151 were killed.

== December 25, 1953 (Friday) ==
- The Amami Islands were returned to Japan after 8 years of United States military occupation.
- Died:
  - Patsy Donovan, 88, Irish-born American Major League Baseball right fielder and manager
  - William Haselden, 81, Spanish cartoonist
  - Lee Shubert (born Levi Schubart), 82, Polish-born American theater owner and operator

== December 30, 1953 (Wednesday) ==
- The first color television sets went on sale for about US$1,175 – RCA Model 5 Prototype, which became CT-100, and Admiral C1617A.

== December 31, 1953 (Thursday) ==
- Born: James Remar, American actor, in Boston
