= Kaboni Savage =

American drug dealer and mass murderer (born 1975)

- Born: January 1, 1975 (age 51); Philadelphia, Pennsylvania, U.S.
- Other names: Bonnie, Yusef Billa, Joseph Amill
- Education: Frankford High School
- Children: Ciara "CeCe" Savage (deceased), two other daughters, and one son
- Parent: Barbara Savage (mother)
- Relatives: Kidada Savage (sister), one other sister
- Status: Incarcerated
- Convictions: Murder in aid of racketeering (12 counts); Witness tampering resulting in death Conspiracy to commit murder in aid of racketeering Retaliating against a witness resulting in death Conspiracy to commit racketeering Using fire to commit a felony Conspiracy to manufacture and distribute cocaine Money laundering (5 counts); Possession of a firearm by a convicted felon Threatening a witness (3 counts); Threatening to retaliate against a witness (2 counts); Using a telephone to facilitate drug trafficking (2 counts)
- Penalty: Death (June 3, 2013); commuted to life imprisonment without the possibility of parole (December 23, 2024)
- Accomplice: Jasmine Vadell (girlfriend)

Details
- Victims: 12
- Span of crimes: 1998–2004
- Country: United States
- State: Pennsylvania
- Imprisoned at: ADX Florence

Kaboni Savage (born January 1, 1975) is an American drug dealer, organized crime leader, and mass murderer who was convicted of ordering the firebombing of a house where a federal witness lived, killing six people (including four children). He is the first man from Philadelphia in modern history to receive a federal death sentence. He has twelve convictions for murder in aid of racketeering, one fewer than the Pennsylvania state record, and the most for anyone in Philadelphia. Savage was the first person sentenced to death by the United States District Court for the Eastern District of Pennsylvania since the federal death penalty resumed in 1988. On December 23, 2024, Savage's death sentence was commuted to life without parole by President Joe Biden.

== History ==
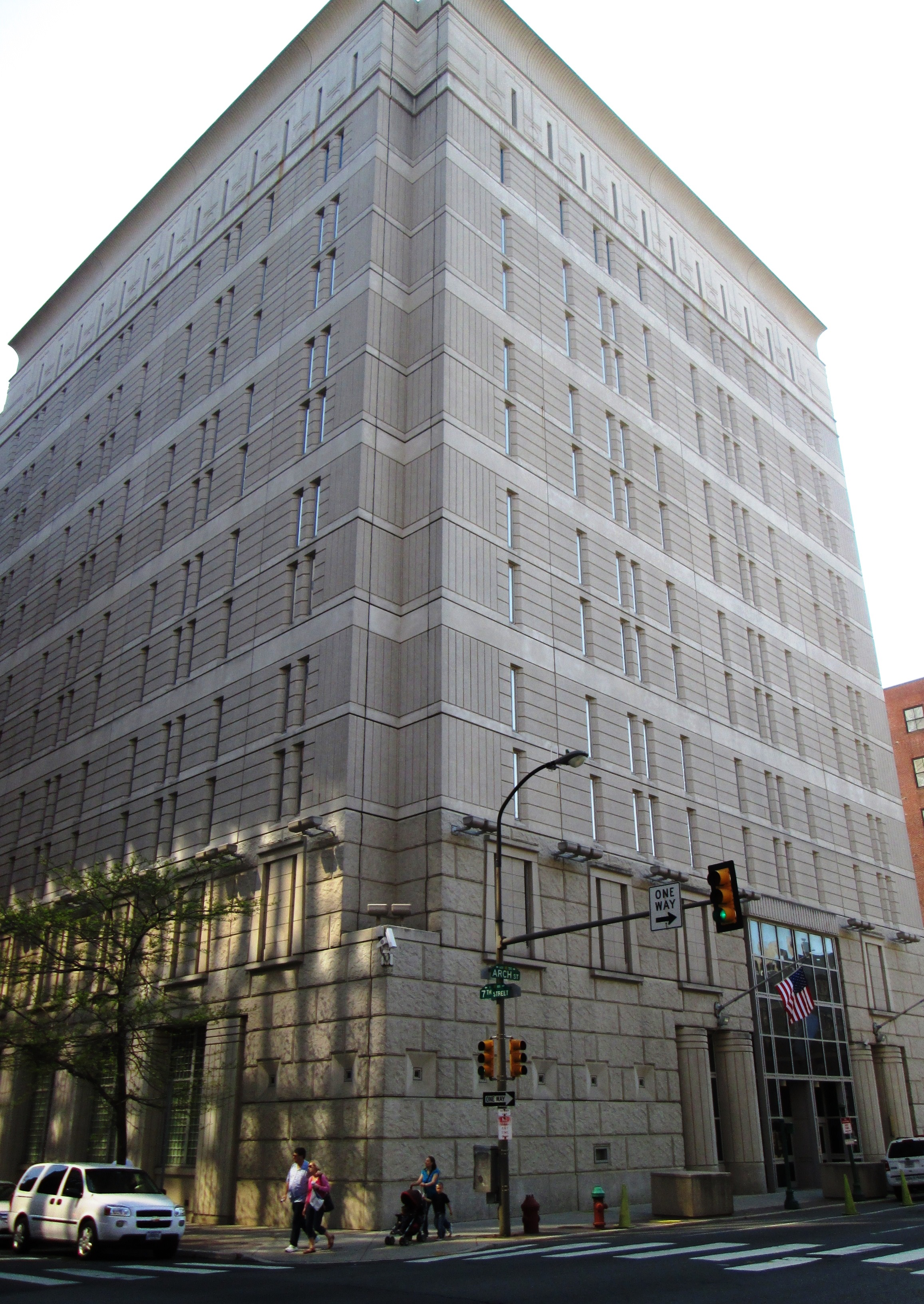
While at Federal Detention Center, Philadelphia, Savage ordered acts of intimidation, including the murders in a row house

Savage, a former student of Frankford High School, began boxing at the Front Street Gym in North Philadelphia. He had one professional boxing fight, which he won. Savage's father died of cancer when he was 13 years old.

Savage began his operations as a drug dealer in Hunting Park and became a higher-level dealer. According to federal authorities, Savage, from 1998 to around 2004 distributed hundreds of kilograms of cocaine in the Philadelphia area.

Authorities accused Savage of personally killing a stranger, Kenneth Lassiter, after Lassiter's car bumped into Savage's while the two were trying to park their respective cars. Savage was acquitted of Lassiter's murder after the lead witness in the case, Tybius "Tib" Flowers, was also murdered. Savage is suspected of ordering Flowers' murder.

Savage ordered the deaths of others, including that of Carlton Brown, a drug dealer and competitor of Savage who was shot by hitman Lamont Lewis in 2001. Savage also ordered five other deaths of adult men and engaged in multiple attempts at intimidation while held at the Federal Detention Center, Philadelphia (FDC Philadelphia,), threatening to kill children of those who testified against him.

Less than one week after he was acquitted in the Lassiter case, Savage was arrested and accused of heading a drug trafficking network. He was convicted of 14 out of 16 charges and received a 30-year sentence. Savage was convicted of multiple charges, including money laundering, witness intimidation, and drug offenses. Savage was imprisoned in a federal facility near Florence, Colorado.

Savage's daughter, Ciara "CeCe" Savage, a student at Ross Elementary School, died at age 9 during a gang shooting in York, Pennsylvania on Mothers Day, 2009. The shooter, Nigel Maitland, was convicted of first degree murder for her death and was sentenced to life in prison. Police and Jasmine Vadell, Ciara's mother, said the shooting was unrelated to Savage's gang activities in Philadelphia. Vadell had raised Ciara alone and had not been romantically involved with Savage for years.

=== Firebombing ===
Eugene "Twin" Coleman, who was previously working with Savage, was arrested and put in federal custody on October 8, 2004, and agreed to testify against Savage in a drug trial. In March 2003, after Coleman murdered his friend, 26-year-old Tyrone Toliver of Cherry Hill, New Jersey, federal agents encouraged Coleman's 54-year-old mother, Marcella Coleman, a prison guard at the Curran-Fromhold Correctional Facility, to move to a new house; believing that she could defend herself, she refused. Savage was convicted partly due to Coleman's testimony.

In return, Savage ordered Marcella Coleman's house in North Philadelphia to be burned down. At the time, Savage was in custody at FDC Philadelphia. At about 5 a.m. on October 9, 2004, the rowhouse was firebombed. The fire originated in a living room on the first floor, traveled quickly, and was extinguished after about 20 minutes. There were no survivors; it was the deadliest mass murder in Philadelphia since the Lex Street murders in 2000. Included in the death toll were Coleman; Eugene Coleman’s 15-month-old son Damir Jenkins; three other youths related to Coleman, 10-year-old Khadjah Nash, 12-year-old Tahj Porchea, and 15-year-old Sean Rodriguez ; and 34-year-old Tameka Nash, Coleman's cousin and the mother of Khadjah Nash. The family dog, a pit bull, also perished.

After learning that Eugene had been temporarily released from prison to attend the funeral of his relatives, a bug in Savage's cell recorded him remarking "They should stop off and get him some barbecue sauce … pour it on them burnt bitches."

Savage's sister, Kidada Savage, known as "Da" or "Lil' Sis", helped plot this crime by recruiting Lamont Lewis, the hitman. Lewis had been previously acquitted of killing Carlton "Muhammad" Brown, who died in 2001. Lewis in turn asked Robert "B.J." Merritt Jr., his cousin, to help him. Kidada Savage showed the hitman where the house was located. According to federal prosecutors Merritt was the one who lit a gasoline can and threw it, and another one into the house. Lewis said that both he and Merritt tossed cans into the house.

Lewis stated that he did not know children were in the house until after they died, and that Kidada Savage only gave him $2,000 even though she promised him $5,000. After authorities captured Lewis he agreed to cooperate.

Coleman stated that Dawud "Cool" Bey, another drug dealer who was communicating with Savage while being held at FDC Philadelphia, told him that Savage wanted his family dead.

Police did not find Lewis at a house in West Philadelphia which they believed was his, but later arrested him in 2007 when he was driving his car.

== Trials and sentencing ==
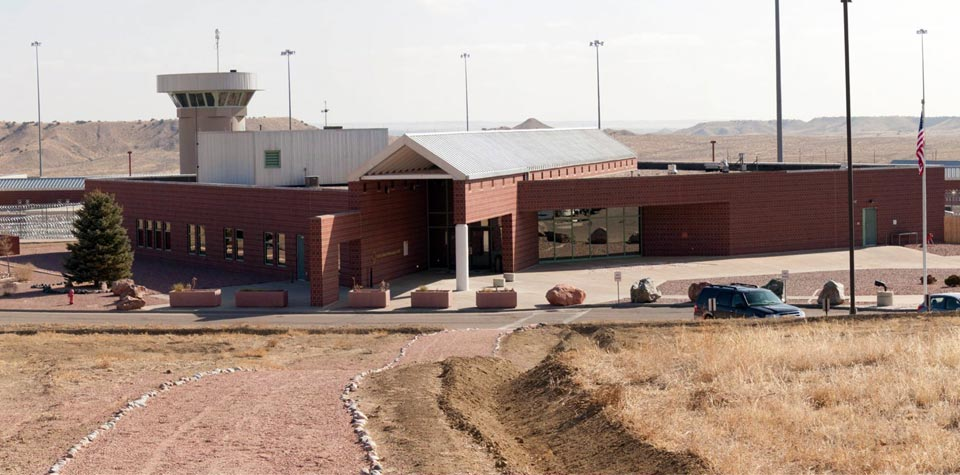
ADX Florence, where Savage is held

Savage was held at FDC Philadelphia during his trial. The prosecution sought death sentences for Kaboni Savage, Merritt, and Northington.

Jury selection for Savage's trial occurred in September 2012. Lamont Lewis served as the star witness, testifying against Kaboni and Kidada Savage as well as Merritt and Steven Northington. The trial ended in May 2013. On May 13, 2013, Savage was convicted of 17 charges, including 12 counts of murder in aid of racketeering.

In June 2013, Savage was given 13 death sentences, one for witness intimidation and one each for a total of 12 racketeering murders, including those from the retaliatory firebombing. The sentences were formally pronounced by Judge Richard Barclay Surrick.

In addition to the 2004 firebombing that killed six people, Savage was convicted of murdering Kenneth Lassiter in 1998, Mansur Abdullah in 2000, Carlton Brown in 2001, Barry Parker in 2003, Tyrone Toliver in 2003 and Tybius Flowers in 2004, all of whom were killed in Philadelphia.

Savage, Federal Bureau of Prisons #58232-066, is currently incarcerated in ADX Florence near Florence, Colorado.

In May 2013, Kidada Savage was convicted of various crimes, including retaliating against witnesses and aiding racketeering. In February 2014, Surrick imposed a sentence of life imprisonment plus a consecutive ten-year sentence; the life sentence was mandatory. Kidada Savage tried to delay the sentencing but Surrick denied the request. Kidada is now BOP #04867-748 at FCI Tallahassee.

Merritt avoided a possible death sentence after he was only convicted of non-capital charges. He was given a life sentence as BOP #59317-066 at USP Terre Haute. After the jury spared his life, Northington received a life sentence. He became BOP #58967-066 and went to USP Coleman I.

Due to his cooperation, Lewis was given a 40-year sentence, the minimum allowed under his plea agreement. The judge cited his "powerful" testimony and said he seemed genuinely remorseful for what he did.

As an example of Lewis's remorsefulness, Assistant U.S. Attorney John M. Gallagher shared a chat he had overheard between Lewis and a detective. During a break in a meeting with investigators, Lewis said he was going to hell for what he'd done. The detective told Lewis he couldn't know that since God was forgiving. Lewis replied that he'd been raised in church, saying "There is no redemption for me."

In an earlier interview, Lewis said he and Merritt had believed only Coleman's mother and brother were home, and were shocked after learning how many people were killed in the firebombing. "We both were really messed up about what happened," he said.

On December 23, 2024, Savage's federal death sentence was commuted to life without parole after outgoing President Joe Biden granted sentence commutations to 37 of the 40 inmates on federal death row.

== See also ==
- Capital punishment by the United States federal government
