= March 1954 =

Month of 1954

<<	March 1954					>>
Su	Mo	Tu	We	Th	Fr	Sa
	1	2	3	4	5	6
7	8	9	10	11	12	13
14	15	16	17	18	19	20
21	22	23	24	25	26	27
28	29	30	31

The following events occurred in March 1954:

== March 1, 1954 (Monday) ==
- U.S. officials announced that a hydrogen bomb nuclear test (Castle Bravo) had been conducted on Bikini Atoll in the Pacific Ocean as part of Operation Castle.
- U.S. Capitol shooting: Four Puerto Rican nationalists opened fire in the United States House of Representatives chamber and wounded five; they were apprehended by security guards.
- Born:
  - Catherine Bach, American actress
  - Ron Howard, American film director, producer and actor

== March 2, 1954 (Tuesday) ==
- Born: Hunt Sales, musician

== March 3, 1954 (Wednesday) ==
- Born:
  - Keith Fergus, American professional golfer
  - Robert Gossett, American actor
  - John Lilley, American musician

== March 4, 1954 (Thursday) ==
- Born:
  - François Fillon, Prime Minister of France (2007-2012)
  - Ricky Ford, American jazz musician
  - Peter Jacobsen, American professional golfer
  - Boris Moiseev, Russian singer (d. 2022)
  - Ray Troll, American artist
  - Anne Van Lancker, Belgian politician

== March 7, 1954 (Sunday) ==
- Born:
  - Mike Armstrong (baseball), American baseball player
  - Will Grant, American football player
  - Nyls Nyman, American baseball player
  - Carol M. Swain, American political scientist
  - Jasmina Tešanović, Serbian author and political activist
- Died:
  - Otto Diels, 78, German chemist, Nobel Prize laureate
  - Will H. Hays, 74, namesake for the Hays Code

== March 8, 1954 (Monday) ==
- Born:
  - Cheryl Baker, British singer and television presenter
  - Karl Schnabl, Austrian Olympic ski jumper
  - David Wilkie, Scottish Olympic swimmer
- Died:
  - Lawrence Townsend, 93, American diplomat

== March 9, 1954 (Tuesday) ==
- American journalists Edward R. Murrow and Fred W. Friendly produced a 30-minute See It Now documentary, entitled "A Report on Senator Joseph McCarthy".
- Born:
  - Bobby Sands, Irish republican hunger striker (d. 1981)
- Died:
  - Vagn Walfrid Ekman, 79, Swedish oceanographer
  - Eva Ahnert-Rohlfs, 41, German astronomer

== March 12, 1954 (Friday) ==
- Finland and Germany officially ended their state of war.

== March 13, 1954 (Saturday) ==
- First Indochina War: The Battle of Dien Bien Phu began, involving the French Union's French Far East Expeditionary Corps and Việt Minh Communist fighters.
- Died: César Klein, 77, German Expressionist painter

== March 19, 1954 (Friday) ==
- Joey Giardello knocked out Willie Tory at Madison Square Garden, in the first televised boxing prize fight to be shown in color.

== March 23, 1954 (Tuesday) ==
- In Vietnam, the Viet Minh captured the main airstrip of Dien Bien Phu. The remaining French Army units there were partially isolated.

== March 25, 1954 (Thursday) ==
- The 26th Academy Awards ceremony was held.
- RCA manufactured the first color television set (12-inch screen; price: $1,000).
- The Soviet Union recognised the sovereignty of East Germany. Soviet troops remained in the country.

== March 26, 1954 (Friday) ==
- Born: Kazuhiko Inoue, Japanese voice actor
- Died: Louis Silvers, 64, American film composer

== March 27, 1954 (Saturday) ==
- The Castle Romeo nuclear test explosion was executed.

== March 28, 1954 (Sunday) ==
- Puerto Rico's first television station, WKAQ-TV, commenced broadcasting.
- The trial of A. L. Zissu and 12 other Zionist leaders ended with harsh sentences in Communist Romania.
- The British troopship HMT Empire Windrush suffered an engine-room explosion and fire. Four crew were killed but 1494 crew and passengers were saved. The abandoned ship sank two days later.
- Egyptian protests in The Republic of Egypt against democracy.
- Born:
  - Bill Bourne, Canadian musician (d. 2022)
  - Arthur Frederick Goode III, American murderer (d. 1984)

== March 29, 1954 (Monday) ==
- A C-47 transport with French nurse Geneviève de Galard on board was wrecked on the runway at Dien Bien Phu.
- Born: Karen Ann Quinlan, American right-to-die cause célèbre (d. 1985)

== March 30, 1954 (Tuesday) ==
- Toronto subway: The first operational subway line in Canada.
- Died: Horatio Dresser, 88, American writer

== March 31, 1954 (Wednesday) ==
- Born: Tony Brock, British musician
