= February 1954 =

Month of 1954

<<	February 1954					>>
Su	Mo	Tu	We	Th	Fr	Sa
	1	2	3	4	5	6
7	8	9	10	11	12	13
14	15	16	17	18	19	20
21	22	23	24	25	26	27
28

The following events occurred in February 1954:

== February 1, 1954 (Monday) ==
- Died: Edwin Howard Armstrong, 63, American electrical engineer, suicide by jumping

== February 2, 1954 (Tuesday) ==
- U.S. President Dwight D. Eisenhower reported the detonation of the first H-bomb (done in 1952).
- Born: Christie Brinkley, American actress, model, and entrepreneur, in Monroe, Michigan

== February 3, 1954 (Wednesday) ==
- Elizabeth II became the first reigning monarch to visit Australia.

== February 5, 1954 (Friday) ==
- Born: Guy Novès, former French rugby player and teacher (mainly Stade Toulousain), in Toulouse, Occitania Region, France

== February 6, 1954 (Saturday) ==
- Died: Maxwell Bodenheim, American poet and novelist (murdered) (b. 1892)

== February 7, 1954 (Sunday) ==
- Born: Maïk Darah, French voice actress, especially well-known for dubbing Whoopi Goldberg

== February 8, 1954 (Monday) ==
- Died: Laurence Trimble, 68, American actor
- Born: Larry Lee McCallister

== February 9, 1954 (Tuesday) ==
- Died: Mabel Paige, 73, American actress

== February 10, 1954 (Wednesday) ==
- After authorizing $385 million over the $400 million already budgeted for military aid to Vietnam, President of the United States Dwight D. Eisenhower warned against his country's intervention in Vietnam.

== February 12, 1954 (Friday) ==
- Died: Dziga Vertov, 58, Russian filmmaker

== February 13, 1954 (Saturday) ==
- Born: Donnie Moore, American baseball player (d. 1989)

== February 15, 1954 (Monday) ==
- Born: Matt Groening, cartoonist and creator of The Simpsons and Futurama, in Portland, Oregon

== February 16, 1954 (Tuesday) ==
- Born: Iain Banks, Scottish author, in Dunfermline, Fife (d. 2013)

== February 17, 1954 (Wednesday) ==
- Born:
  - Rene Russo, American actress
  - Brian Houston, New Zealand-Australian pastor, in Auckland

== February 18, 1954 (Thursday) ==
- Born: John Travolta, American actor, director and singer, in Englewood, New Jersey

== February 19, 1954 (Friday) ==
- 1954 transfer of Crimea: The Soviet Politburo of the Soviet Union ordered the transfer of the Crimean Oblast from the Russian SFSR to the Ukrainian SSR.
- Born: Sócrates, Brazilian footballer, in Belém, Pará (d. 2011)

== February 21, 1954 (Sunday) ==
- Died: William K. Howard, 54, American film director

== February 23, 1954 (Tuesday) ==
- The first mass vaccination of children against polio began in Pittsburgh, United States.

== February 24, 1954 (Wednesday) ==
- Born: Sid Meier, Canadian video game designer, in Sarnia, Ontario

== February 25, 1954 (Thursday) ==
- Lt. Col. Gamal Abdel Nasser became premier of Egypt.

== February 26, 1954 (Friday) ==
- Born: Recep Tayyip Erdoğan, Turkish politician, President of Turkey, in Istanbul
