= November 1953 =

Month of 1953

<<	November 1953					>>
Su	Mo	Tu	We	Th	Fr	Sa
1	2	3	4	5	6	7
8	9	10	11	12	13	14
15	16	17	18	19	20	21
22	23	24	25	26	27	28
29	30

The following events occurred in November 1953:

== November 1, 1953 (Sunday) ==
- WHEC TV channel 10 in Rochester, NY (CBS) begins broadcasting.
- KMGH TV channel 7 in Denver, CO (CBS) begins broadcasting.
- KCEN TV channel 6 in Temple-Waco, TX (NBC/ABC) begins broadcasting.
- Born: Darrell Issa, American politician, U.S. Representative from California, in Cleveland, Ohio

== November 4, 1953 (Wednesday) ==
- Died: Elizabeth Sprague Coolidge, American pianist and patron of music, in Cambridge, Massachusetts, United States

== November 5, 1953 (Thursday) ==
- David Ben-Gurion resigns as prime minister of Israel.

== November 9, 1953 (Monday) ==
  - Cambodia becomes independent from France.
  - The Laotian Civil War begins between the Kingdom of Laos and the Pathet Lao, all the while resuming the First Indochina War against the French Army in a Two-front war.

== November 13, 1953 (Friday) ==
- Born: Andrés Manuel López Obrador, President of Mexico 2018-2024, in Tepetitán, Tabasco, Mexico
- Born: Henriette Strobel, Dschinghis Khan member since 1979, in Munich, Germany

== November 14, 1953 (Saturday) ==
- Born: Dominique de Villepin, Prime Minister of France from 2005 to 2007, in Rabat, Morocco

== November 16, 1953 (Monday) ==
- Born: Griff Rhys Jones, Welsh comedian, in Cardiff

== November 18, 1953 (Wednesday) ==
- Born: Kevin Nealon, American actor and comedian, in St. Louis, Missouri

== November 20, 1953 (Friday) ==
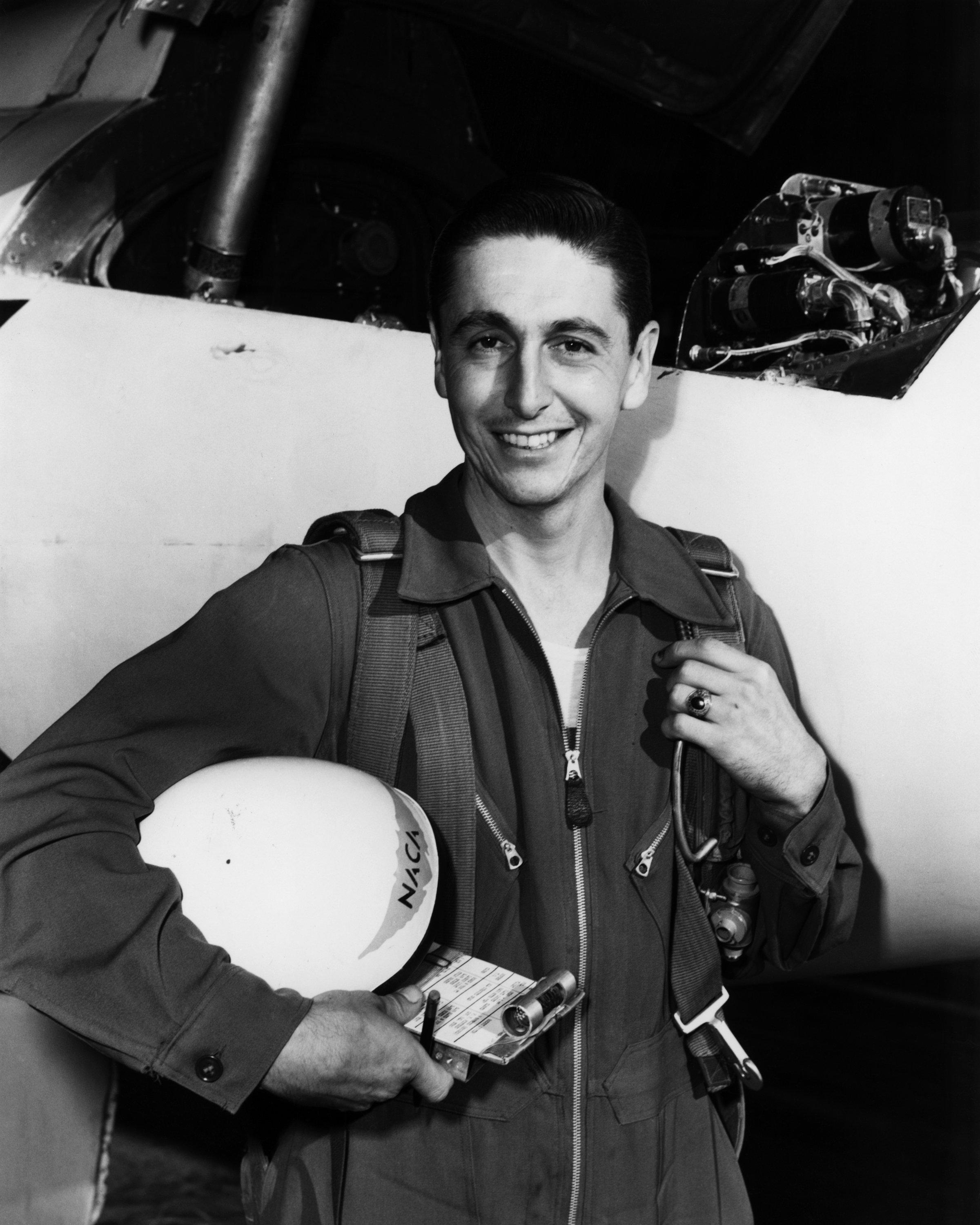
November 20, 1953: Crossfield after Mach 2 flight

- The Douglas D-558-2 Skyrocket, piloted by Scott Crossfield, became the first piloted aircraft to reach Mach 2.
- Authorities at the Natural History Museum, London announced that the skull of Piltdown Man (allegedly an early human discovered in 1912) was a hoax.

== November 21, 1953 (Saturday) ==
- Puerto Williams was founded in Chile as the southernmost settlement of the world.

== November 22, 1953 (Sunday) ==
- Operation Castor: French paratroopers took Điện Biên Phủ.

== November 25, 1953 (Wednesday) ==
- "Match of the Century": England lost 6–3 to Hungary at Wembley Stadium, their first ever loss to a continental European team at home.

== November 29, 1953 (Sunday) ==
- First Indochina War: Battle of Dien Bien Phu – French paratroopers consolidate their position at Điện Biên Phủ.

== November 30, 1953 (Monday) ==
- Kabaka crisis: Edward Mutesa II, the kabaka (king) of Buganda, was deposed and exiled to London by Sir Andrew Benjamin Cohen, Governor of Uganda.
