= Hunting Park, Philadelphia =

Hunting Park
- Neighborhood of Philadelphia
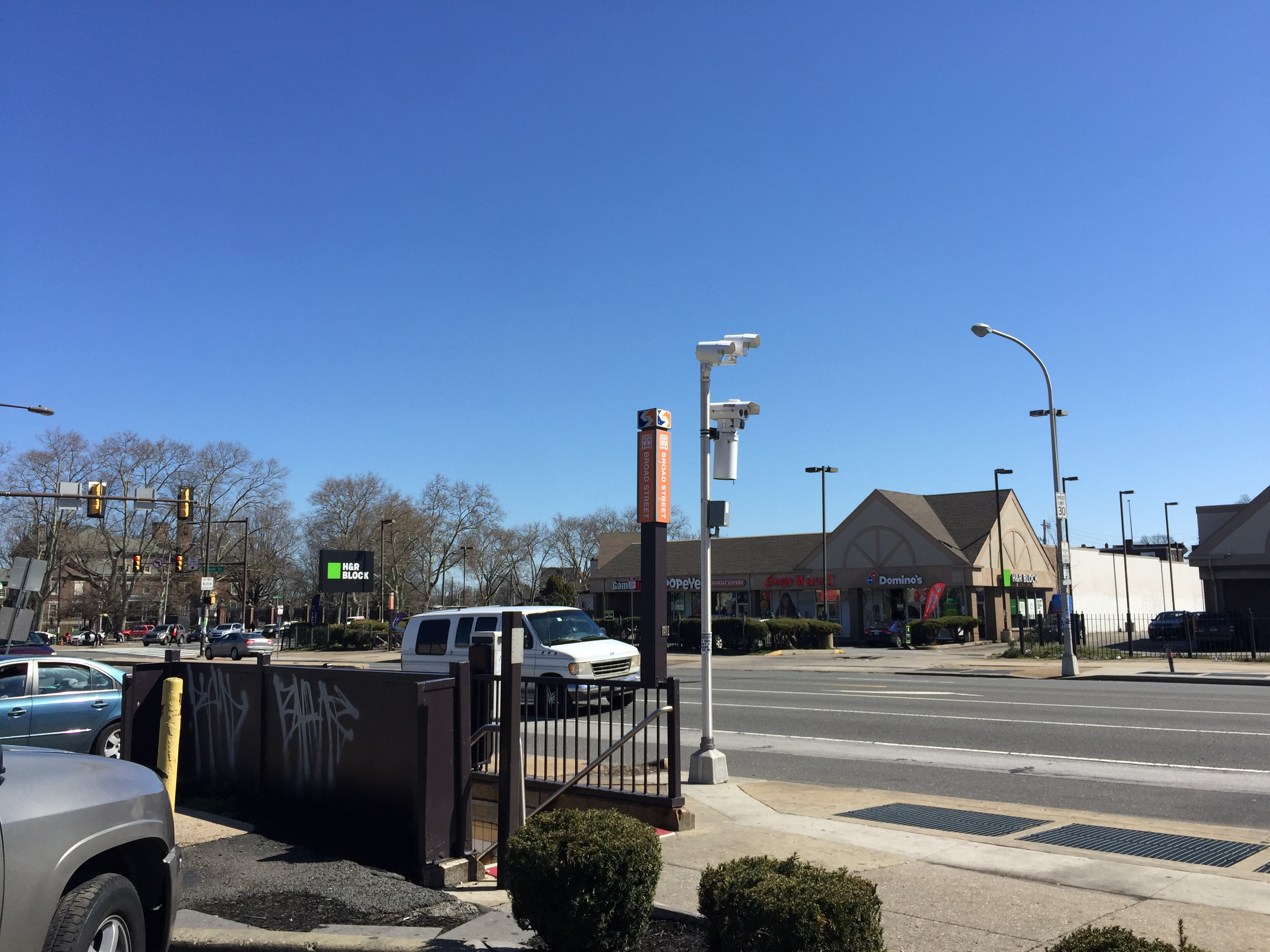
- Hunting Park shopping area at Broad Street

- Location within Philadelphia
- Country: United States
- State: Pennsylvania
- County: Philadelphia
- City: Philadelphia
- Area codes: 215, 267 and 445

Hunting Park is a neighborhood in the North Philadelphia section of Philadelphia, Pennsylvania, United States.

In 2024, the 19140 ZIP code, which roughly consists of Hunting Park and Nicetown–Tioga, has a median home sale price of $113,900.

The Clara Barton School, Alexander K. McClure School, and Bayard Taylor School are listed on the National Register of Historic Places.

== History ==
The neighborhood grew out of the Hunting Park, which was established in the 19th century on the James Logan estate and a race track known as the Hunting Park Course. The neighborhood has historically been the northern part of Franklinville—bounded by North Broad Street and West Sedgley Avenue—most of the 19th century. Today the area is known more as the Hunting Park neighborhood rather than as Franklinville.

In the years leading up to 2010, Hunting Park residents began a campaign against crime.

== Cityscape ==
Hunting Park is located north of Sedgley Avenue, east of the former SEPTA R7 railroad line, south of Roosevelt Boulevard, and west of Front Street. Bordering neighborhoods include Logan to the north, Feltonville to the east, Franklinvillle and Fairhill to the south, and Nicetown–Tioga to the southwest.

== Demographics ==
As of the 2010 Census, Hunting Park was 56% Hispanic of any race, 38.1% non Hispanic black, 2.9% non Hispanic white, 1.9% Asian, and 2.1% all other. The neighborhood is primarily made up of Puerto Ricans, Dominicans, and African Americans.

== Parks and recreation ==
Hunting Park, an 87-acre (35 ha) portion of Fairmount Park, lies in the Hunting Park neighborhood. Tara Murtha of Philadelphia Weekly said "For generations, Hunting Park served as the heart of the community. Then, about 25 years ago [before 2010], it became its noose." Joann Taylor, a member of the Hunting Park Neighborhood Advisory Committee (NAC), said, as paraphrased by Murtha, "By the late '80s, the park was all but lost to hard-working members of the community. But soon community activist groups sprung up out of the negativity."

== Government and infrastructure ==
The United States Post Office operates the Hunting Park Post Office at 4350 North Front Street.

== Education ==
The School District of Philadelphia serves Hunting Park. For elementary school the area is served by the Alexander K. McClure Elementary School (K-5) in Hunting Park, and the Bayard Taylor Elementary School (K-5) in Hunting Park. It is also served by Clemente Middle School (5-8), Edison/Fareira High School (9-12), and Olney High School (9-12).

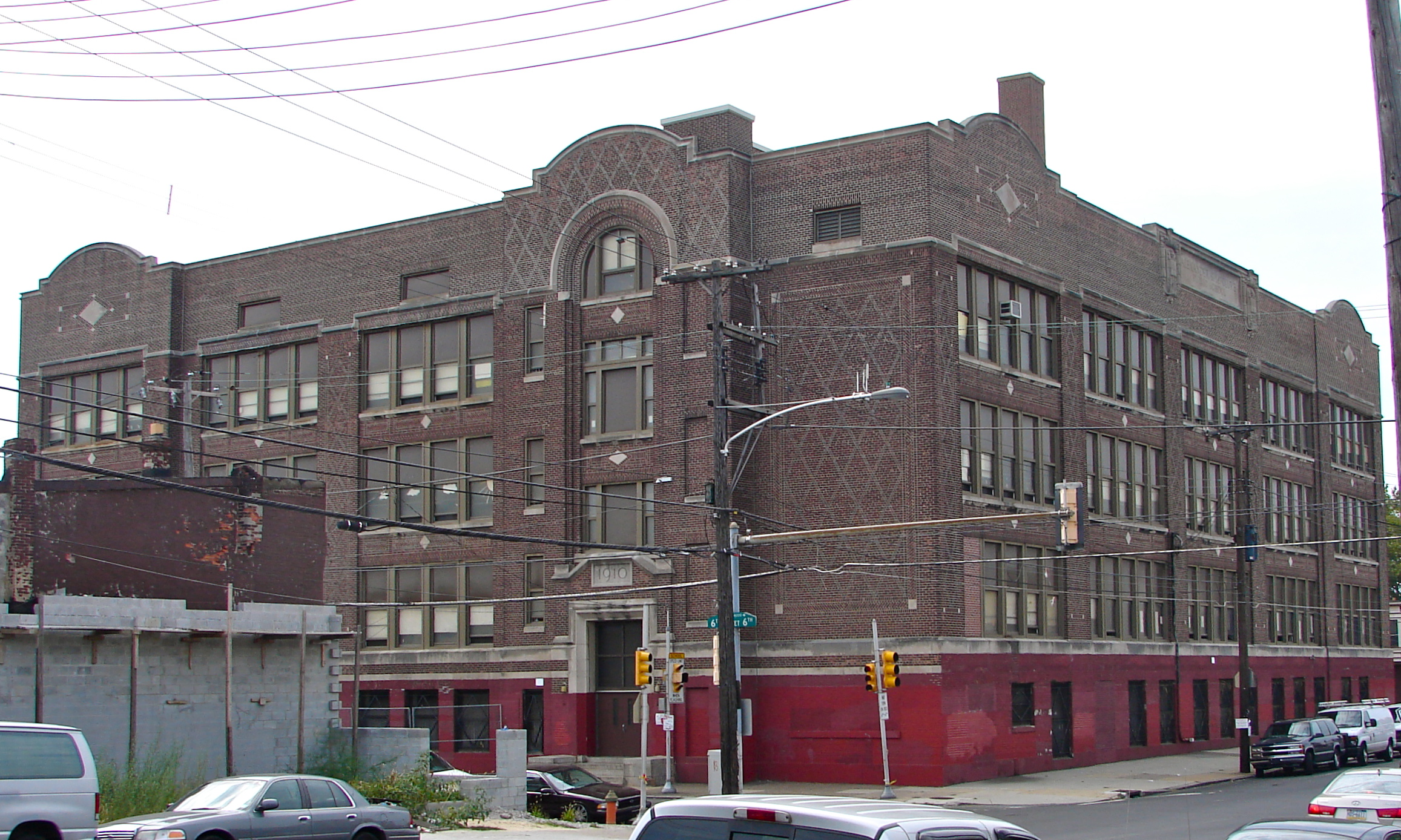
Alexander K. McClure Elementary School

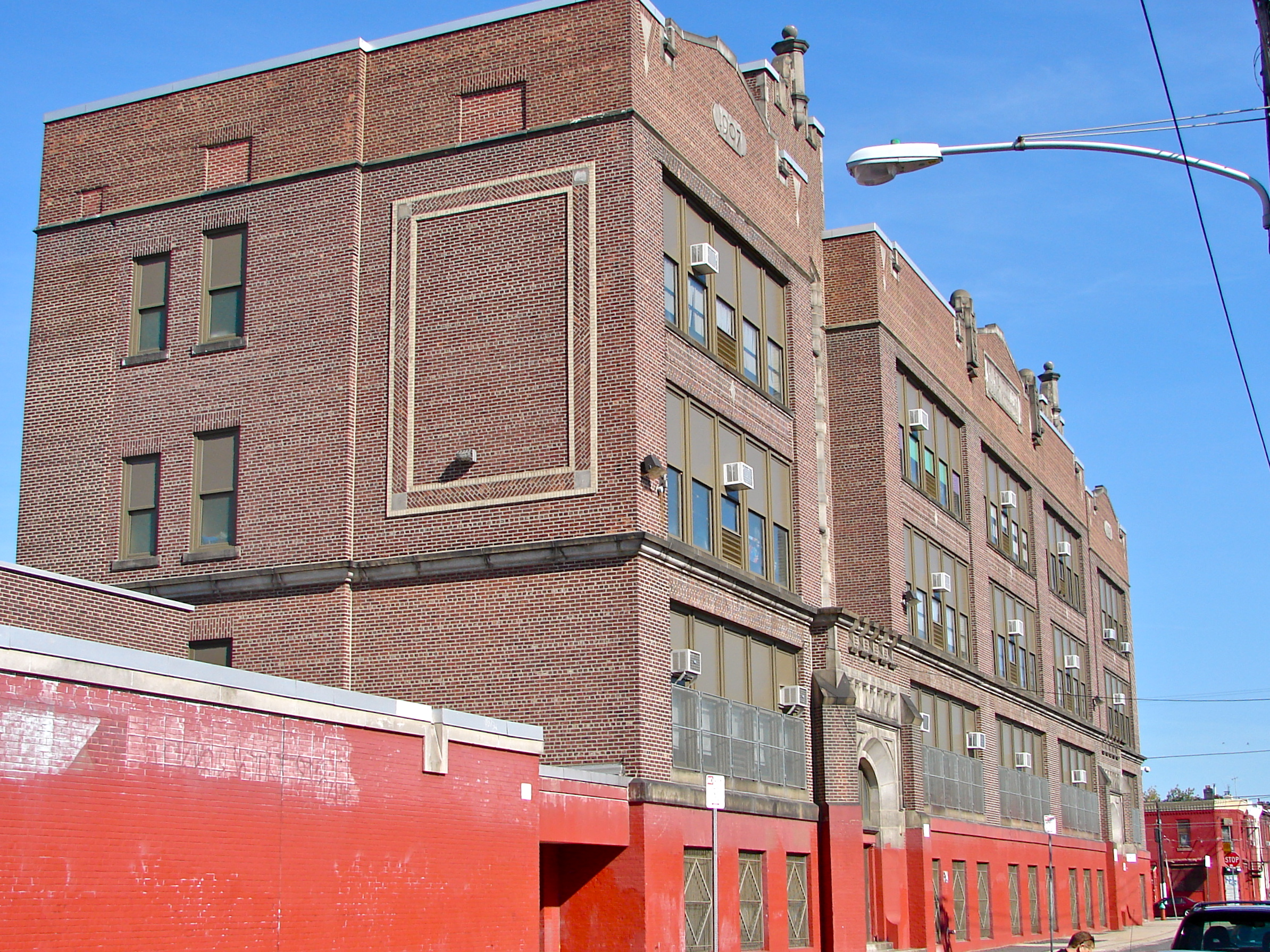
Bayard Taylor Elementary School in Hunting Park

== Transportation ==
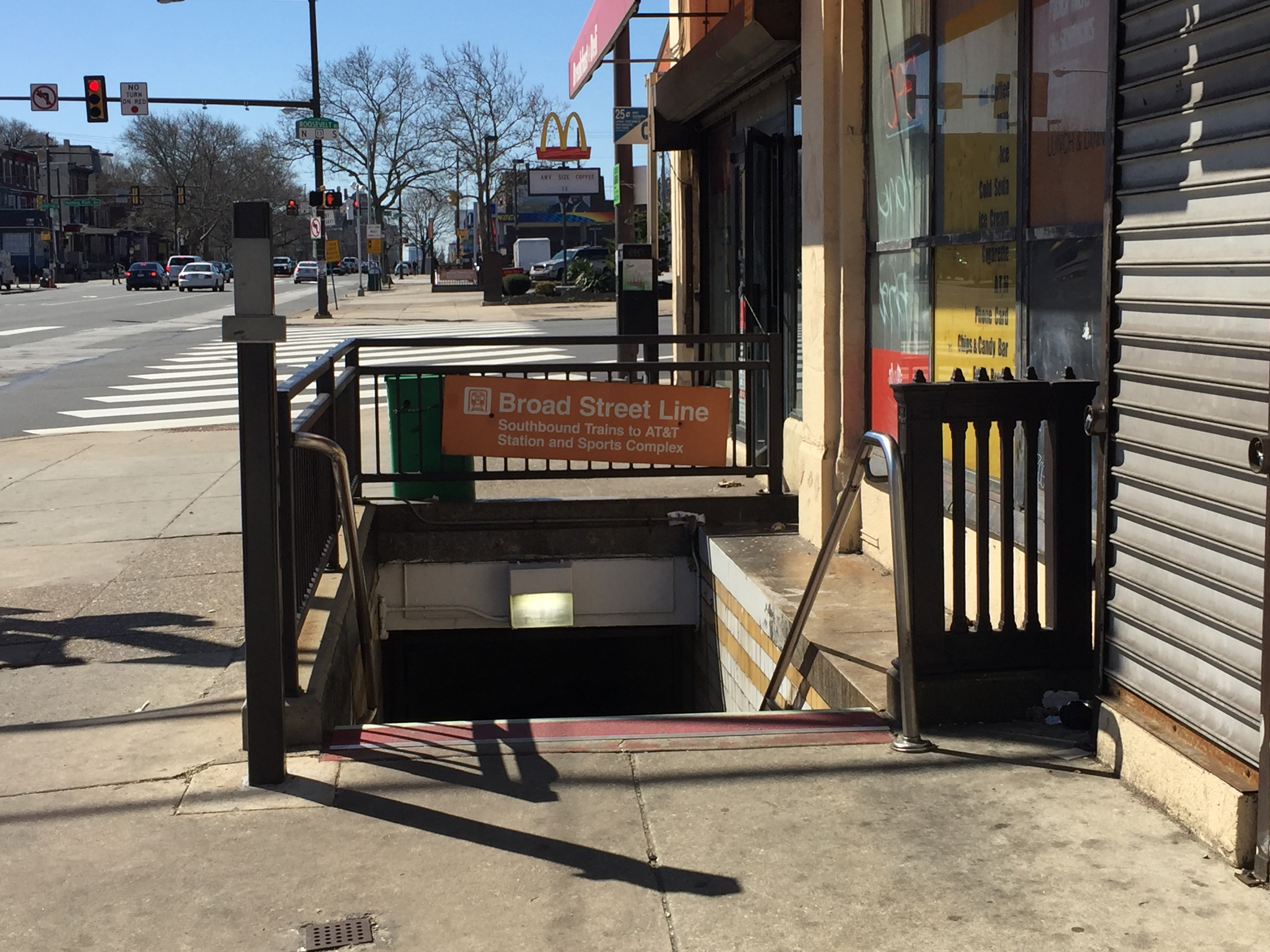
Hunting Park subway station

The area is served by the Broad Street Line subway at the Hunting Park station.

== Animal services ==
The animal shelters ACCT Philly and the Pennsylvania SPCA shelter, which is also the latter's headquarters, are in Hunting Park.

== Notable people ==
- Ibram X. Kendi (academic and activist, while studying at Temple University in the early 2000s)
- Kaboni Savage (murderer and drug dealer)
