= Pennsylvania SPCA =

Pennsylvania Society for the Prevention of Cruelty to Animals (PSPCA) is an animal welfare organization headquartered in Hunting Park, Philadelphia.

== History ==
It was established in 1867. M. Richards Mucklé and husband and wife Caroline Earle White and Richard White co-founded the organization. Its initial focus was on horses in Philadelphia. In time, the agency extended its focus to domestic animals.

The City of Philadelphia previously contracted with the PSPCA to operate its city-owned animal shelter in the 1980s and 1990s. In 2000 the PSPCA chose not to continue operating that shelter, stating that it did not get enough money to operate the facility optimally. And so, an organization created in 2002 called the Philadelphia Animal Care and Control Association (PACCA), an organization created in 2002, took it over. In 2008 the City of Philadelphia gave the contract back to the PSPCA. Tara Murtha of the Philadelphia Weekly, citing why the organization previously left the contract in 2002, stated that the PSPCA getting the city shelter operations back "was an odd move and, frankly, a stupid one."

Howard Nelson, the CEO, closed the animal shelter in Monroe County in 2009. Then he resigned two weeks later. Sue Cosby became CEO in June of that year. Cosby, after taking some time, decided that PSPCA no longer wanted to manage Philadelphia's city-owned shelter and animal control operatons; she concluded that "Animal control didn’t fit in with the mission of PSPCA."

In 2012 the city-run shelter contract was given to a new organization, ACCT Philly, and so PSPCA no longer operates the city-owned shelter. Cosby resigned in December 2011 and joined ACCT Philly as its first director upon its 2012 formation.
