= ACCT Philly =

Animal Care and Control Team of Philadelphia or ACCT Philly is a non-profit organization headquartered in Philadelphia. The city government contracts with ACCT Philly for animal control and animal shelter services.

The ACCT Philly facility is in Hunting Park in North Philadelphia. The building was previously a warehouse.

== History ==
ACCT Philly was created in 2012. The City of Philadelphia previously contracted with the Pennsylvania Society for the Prevention of Cruelty to Animals (PSPCA) in the 1980s and 1990s. In 2000 the PSPCA chose not to continue operating the city-run shelter. This duty was later given to Philadelphia Animal Care and Control Association (PACCA), an organization created in 2002. The Philadelphia Daily News, in 2004, had published an exposé of the PACCA. In 2008 the City of Philadelphia gave the contract back to the PSPCA.

Sue Cosby was the first executive director. She was previously the president of the PSPCA; she resigned in December 2011 and joined ACCT Philly upon its 2012 formation.

In 2017 Stu Bykofsky of the Philadelphia Inquirer stated that ACCT Philly and predecessor organizations that operated the city-owned shelter "[had] been underfunded for decades." Mariah Rush of the same newspaper wrote in 2019 that ACCT Philly "has gone through its share of challenges over the last year".

Susan Russell was the executive director from October 2018 until August 2019. She aimed to increase the animal shelter live release rate, referring to how many animals were adopted or sent to rescue organizations instead of being euthanized or otherwise dying in custody, so that it could be called a "no kill shelter".

Aurora Velasquez for a period was the executive director; in November 2019 she joined the organization. She resigned in 2021. Sarah Barnett became the acting executive director, then formally was designated such on January 1, 2023.

In 2004 the city-contracted animal shelter, under pre-ACCT Philly management, had a live release rate of around 20%. Circa 2013 the live release rate was 62%. In 2017 this rate was 80%, characterized by Bykofsky as "good". In January 2021, the live release rate went up to 92%, the highest at the time.
