= Weston Bousfield =

American psychologist and professor at the University of Connecticut (1904–1986)

Weston Ashmore Bousfield
- Born: April 22, 1904; Sao Ching, China
- Died: September 6, 1986 (aged 82); Storrs, Connecticut, US
- Education: Harvard University (PhD, MA); Boston University (MA); Northeastern University (BME)
- Occupations: Psychologist, college professor
- Employer: University of Connecticut

Weston Ashmore Bousfield (April 22, 1904 – September 6, 1986) was an American experimental psychologist and professor at the University of Connecticut (UConn) from 1939 to 1971. His research focused on the study of organization in memory, category clustering, and free recall.

Bousfield was born in China to Christian missionary parents Cyril Eustace and Lillie (Snowden) Bousfield. He graduated from Northeastern University (Bachelor of Mechanical Engineering, 1927), Boston University (MA, 1928), and Harvard University (MA, 1932; PhD, 1933). He taught at Tufts University from 1929 to 1939. Moving to UConn, he served as psychology department chair from 1939 to 1960. He retired in 1971.

Bousfield built the university's psychology department into a regional powerhouse, quadrupling its faculty size and launching multiple doctoral programs during his chairship. Built in 1974, the Weston A. Bousfield Psychology Building at UConn was named in his honor in 1989.

Bousfield published 80 research articles over the course of his 40-year academic career. He was a fellow of the American Psychological Association and the American Association for the Advancement of Science and former president of the Connecticut State Psychological Society.

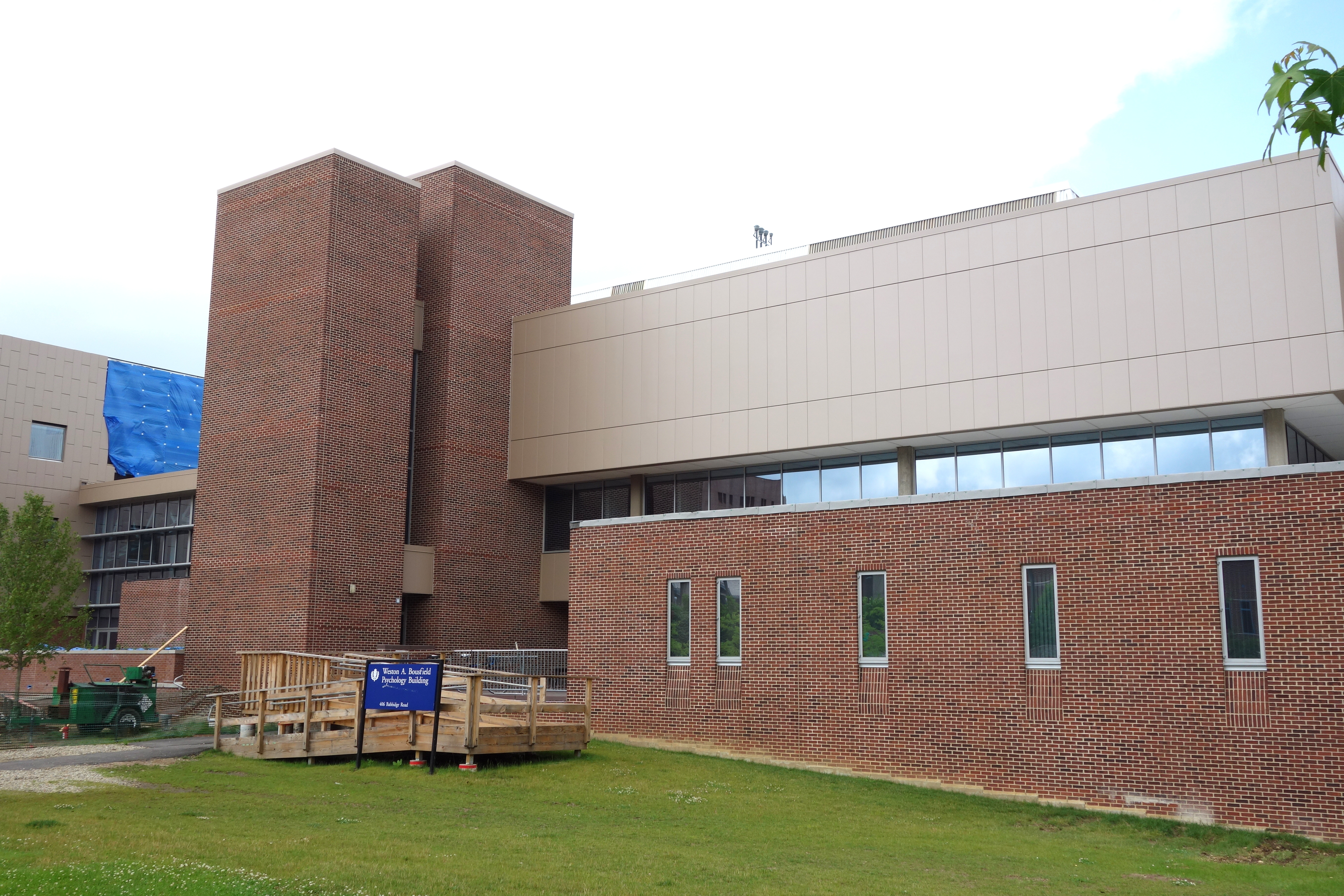
Weston A. Bousfield Psychology Building at the University of Connecticut
