= William Powell (cricketer) =

English cricketer (1885–1954)

Personal information
- Full name: William Allan Powell
- Born: 19 January 1885; Blundellsands, Lancashire
- Died: 1 January 1954 (aged 68); Earl's Court, London
- Batting: Right-handed
- Bowling: Right-arm fast

Domestic team information
- Years: Team
- 1912–1921: Kent

Career statistics
Competition	First-class
Matches	15
Runs scored	187
Batting average	11.00
100s/50s	0/0
Top score	48
Balls bowled	974
Wickets	19
Bowling average	29.42
5 wickets in innings	1
10 wickets in match	0
Best bowling	5/40
Catches/stumpings	8/–
- Source: CricInfo, 24 November 2016

William Allan Powell (19 January 1885 – 1 January 1954) was an English amateur cricketer who played first-class cricket for Kent County Cricket Club during the Golden Age of cricket before the First World War. He was born in 1885 Blundellsands in Lancashire and educated at Cranleigh School. He died in Earl's Court in London on New Years Day 1954, aged 68.

== Cricket career ==
Powell made his first-class cricket debut in 1909, playing three times for HDG Leveson-Gower's XI in matches against Cambridge and Oxford Universities. He had first appeared for the Kent Second XI in 1908 and went on to play Second XI cricket in each season until 1912, including making six appearances for Kent in the Minor Counties Championship in 1911 and 1912.

Powell made his first-class debut for Kent in 1912 against Gloucestershire at the College Ground, Cheltenham. He played 12 times for Kent during his career, making eight appearances during 1913 as part of the 1913 County Championship winning team, the fourth of Kent's Championship wins during the period before the First World War. As an amateur cricketer, Powell played only when he was available, often taking the place of a professional who may well have been a "more able" cricketer.

During the 1913 season he scored a "brutal" 48 runs against Northamptonshire at the end of May, the highest first-class score of his career, but only contributed 114 runs and 11 wickets in total and is considered as having been a "bit part" player who "showed glimpses of his talent". After recording career-best bowling figures of 3/37 against Yorkshire at the beginning of June, Powell injured a finger and did not return to the team until July, replacing Frank Woolley who had been selected for the Gentlemen v Players match.

Powell went on to play just once for Kent in 1914 before making one final appearances for the county in the 1921 season.

== Bibliography ==
- Carlaw, Derek (2020). Kent County Cricketers, A to Z: Part One (1806–1914) (PDF). Cardiff: ACS.
