= Maudelle Bousfield =

American educator

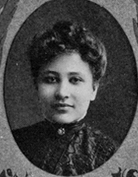
- Photograph of Bousfield from the University of Illinois yearbook, 1906.
- Born: Maudelle Tanner Brown; June 1, 1885; St. Louis, Missouri, U.S.
- Died: October 14, 1971 (aged 86); Chicago, Illinois, U.S.
- Occupation: Educator
- Years active: 1913–1952
- Known for: Noted as the first African–American school principal within the Chicago Public Schools district.
- Spouse: Midian Othello Bousfield (m. 1914; died 1948)
- Children: 1
- Relatives: Henry Ossawa Tanner (cousin); W. Leonard Evans Jr. (son-in-law)

Maudelle Tanner Bousfield (née Brown; June 1, 1885 – October 14, 1971) was an American educator. Bousfield was the first African–American woman to graduate from the University of Illinois, and the first African–American school principal within the Chicago Public Schools district.

== Biography ==
=== Early life and education ===
Bousfield was born Maudelle Tanner Brown in St. Louis, Missouri. Her parents were Charles Hugh Brown and Arrena Isabella Tanner Brown, who were both educators. Bousfield attended the Charles Kunkel Conservatory of Music in St. Louis during her youth.

Bousfield enrolled at the University of Illinois in 1903. She graduated with honors in 1906, with degrees in astronomy and mathematics, becoming the first African-American woman graduate from the University of Illinois. After her time at the University of Illinois, Bousfield took courses at the Chicago Mendelssohn School of Music, and earned a master's degree in education at the University of Chicago.

=== Career ===
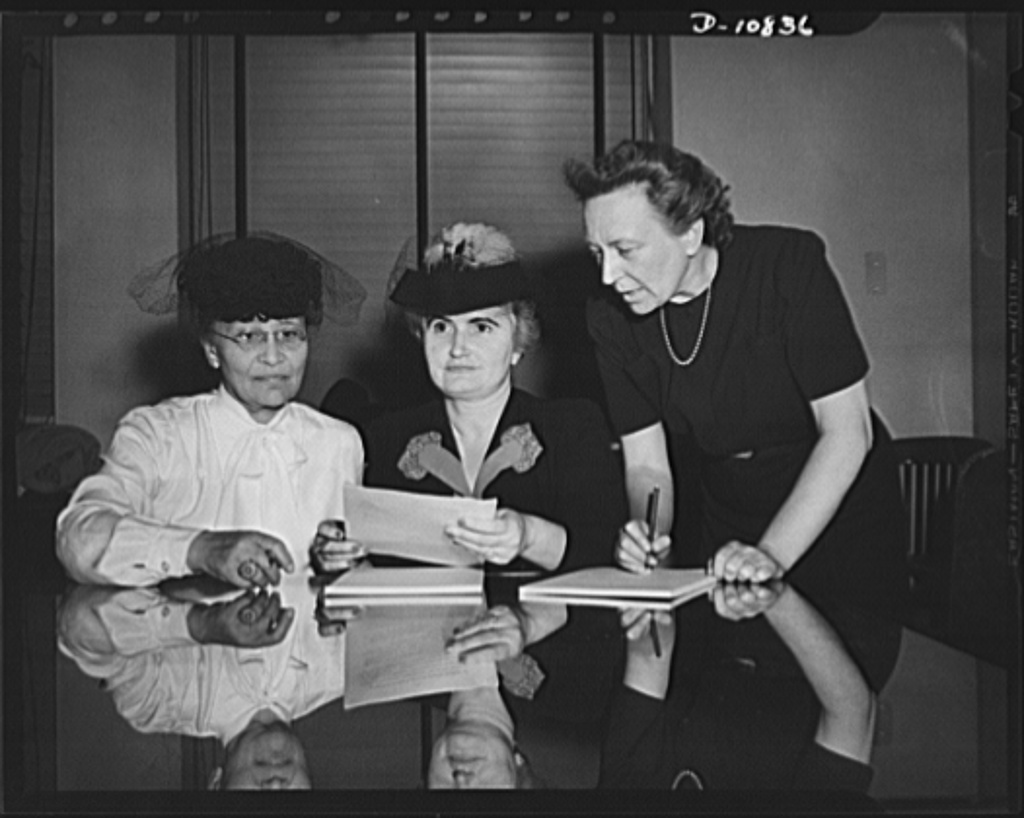
Women's Policy Committee of the War Manpower Commission. At the first meeting of the Women's Policy Committee of the War Manpower Commission on October 1, 1942, three members get acquainted. They are, left to right: Maudelle Bousfield, Margaret A. Hickey, chairman; and Sara Southall.

Bousfield played piano and taught mathematics before briefly resigning in 1914. Bousfield returned to teaching in 1922, later taking the principal's exam in 1926. Bousfield scored high on the exam and was assigned to head Keith Elementary School in 1927, becoming the first African–American school principal in the Chicago Public Schools district. In 1939, Bousfield became the first African–American high school principal in the same district, after being assigned to head the predominately African–American Wendell Phillips High School in Bronzeville neighborhood of the city. In addition to her tenure as principal, Bousfield served on the Women's Policy Committee of the War Manpower Commission, with Margaret A. Hickey and Sara Southall during World War II. Bousfield retired from Wendell Phillips High School after eleven years in 1950, with plans to travel: "I'll have a chance to see some of the far away places that have made atlases so fascinating to me."

=== Later years and death ===
In her later years, Bousfield traveled, worked with the United Negro College Fund, and taught at Fisk University. She also wrote a gardening column for the Chicago Defender newspaper. Bousfield served as the sixth international president (Supreme Basileus) of Alpha Kappa Alpha, the historically black sorority. She was a charter member of the National Association of Negro Musicians. Bousfield died on October 14, 1971, aged 86, in Chicago.

== Personal life and legacy ==
Bousfield was married once and had a daughter. In 1914, she married physician, Midian Othello Bousfield, and together they had a daughter, Maudelle (b. 1915; d. 2013). Bousfield's daughter was married businessman W. Leonard Evans Jr. Midian Bousfield died in 1948. Bousfield's cousin was artist Henry Ossawa Tanner. In 2013, a new residence hall at the University of Illinois was named Bousfield Hall, in her memory. The Maudelle Brown Bousfield Apartments are run by the Chicago Housing Authority.
