= James A. Byrne United States Courthouse =

American federal court house

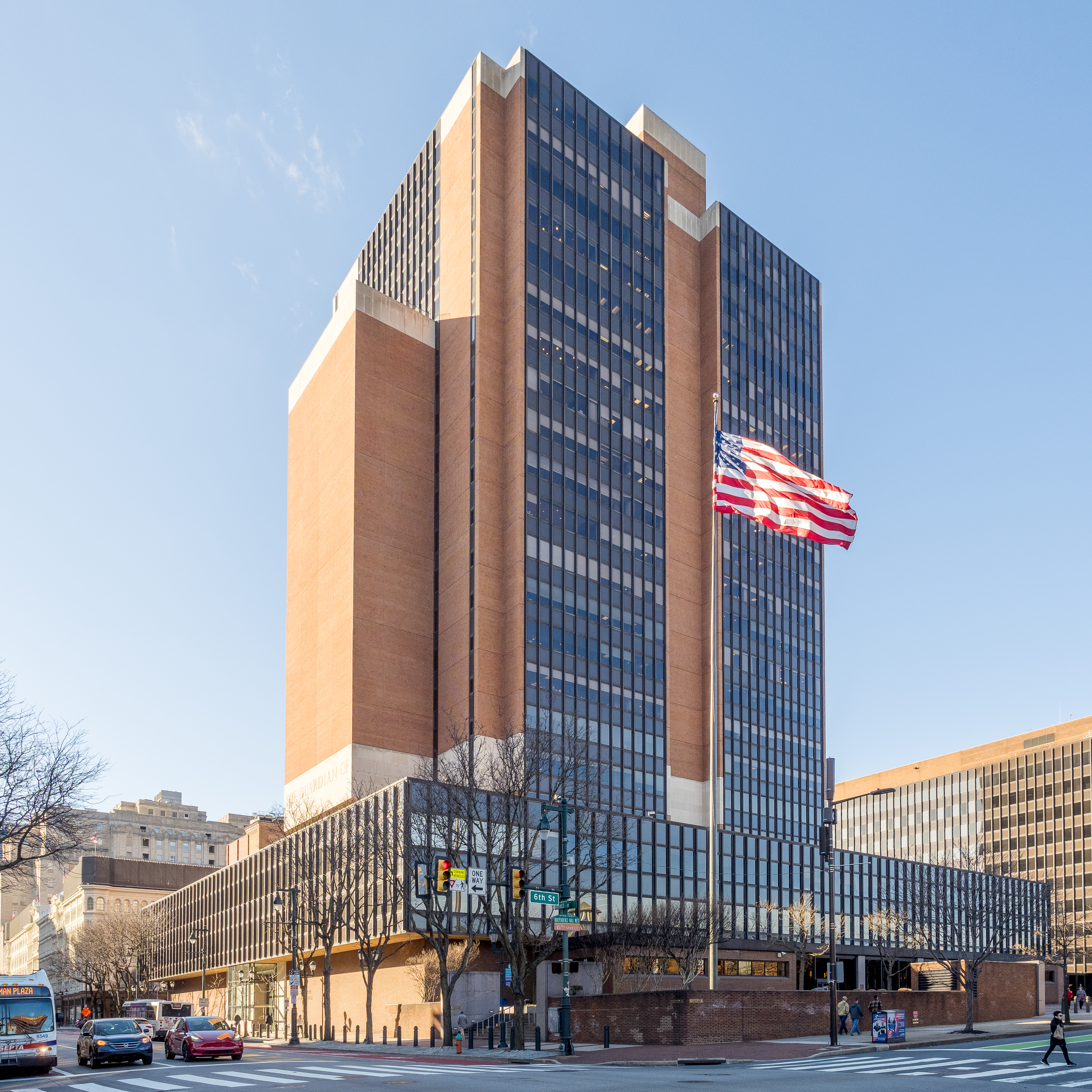
- (2024)

- Location within Philadelphia Location within Pennsylvania Location within the United States

General information
- Type: Federal courthouse, office
- Location: 601 Market Street, Philadelphia, Pennsylvania, U.S.
- Coordinates: 39°57′03″N 75°09′01″W
- Opening: 1975
- Owner: General Services Administration

Height
- Roof: 303 ft (92 m)

Technical details
- Floor count: 26

Design and construction
- Architects: Bellante & Clauss; Carroll, Grisdale & Van Alen; Stewart, Noble, Class & Partners
- Engineer: Lev Zetlin & Associates

The James A. Byrne United States Courthouse is a Federal courthouse in the Center City region of Philadelphia. The court houses the United States Court of Appeals for the Third Circuit and the United States District Court for the Eastern District of Pennsylvania. It is located at 601 Market Street between N. 6th and N. 7th Streets, next to Independence Mall. The building is named after James A. Byrne, a former Democrat in the U.S. House of Representatives.

Construction on the building, which overlooks Independence National Park, began in 1970. The building and the adjacent federal building were both designed by Bellante & Clauss, Carroll, Grisdale & Van Alen and Stewart, Noble, Class & Partners, all of Philadelphia. It opened in late 1975, to coincide with the celebration of the Bicentennial of the Declaration of Independence. It houses a Louise Nevelson sculpture titled Bicentennial Dawn. Under the leadership of former Chief Third Circuit Judge Edward R. Becker, the main entrance and ground floor lobby were redesigned in 2004 to be more inviting and educational to the general public. After his death in 2006, the lobby, which features quotations on the importance of the right to jury trial, was dedicated to and named for Judge Becker.

Along with the adjacent William J. Green, Jr. Federal Building, the Courthouse is part of the largest Federal complex in Philadelphia, with 1.7 million gross square feet. It shares mechanical systems and an underground garage with the Green Building.
