= National Negro Network =

American radio network

The National Negro Network was a black-oriented radio programming service in the United States founded on January 20, 1954 by Chicago advertiser W. Leonard Evans, Jr. It was the first black-owned radio network in the country, and its programming was broadcast on up to 45 affiliates. An article in the trade publication Broadcasting said that the network was expected "to reach approximately 12 million of the 15 million Negroes in America."

Evans was the network's president. Reggie Schuebel was vice president-treasurer, and John M. Wyatt was executive vice president.

The network featured a variety of different programming, including a popular soap opera The Story of Ruby Valentine, which was based on CBS's We Love and Learn and As the Twig is Bent, and starred Juanita Hall, Ruby Dee and Terry Carter. The serial was sponsored by, among others, Philip Morris and Pet Milk. Other short-lived series included The Life of Anna Lewis with Hilda Simms, and It's A Mystery Man with Cab Calloway.

Some shows were produced by Calloway and Ethel Waters. Other fare included broadcasts of symphony concerts from black colleges, and programs hosted by black DJs at affiliate stations.

The network drew up plans for several more series, but—with the TV era exploding—fell apart within a year due to inadequate capital.

Jason Chambers wrote in his book, Madison Avenue and the Color Line: African Americans in the Advertising Industry, that Evans felt that advertising agencies were hesitant to recommend NNN to clients. "Agencies are aware of our existence and watch our growth closely," Evans said, "but ... are still reluctant to come right out and make a recommendation [for using] Negro radio, preferring to keep campaigns at a 'test' level while watching to see what others do."
