= Bayard Taylor School =

- U.S. National Register of Historic Places
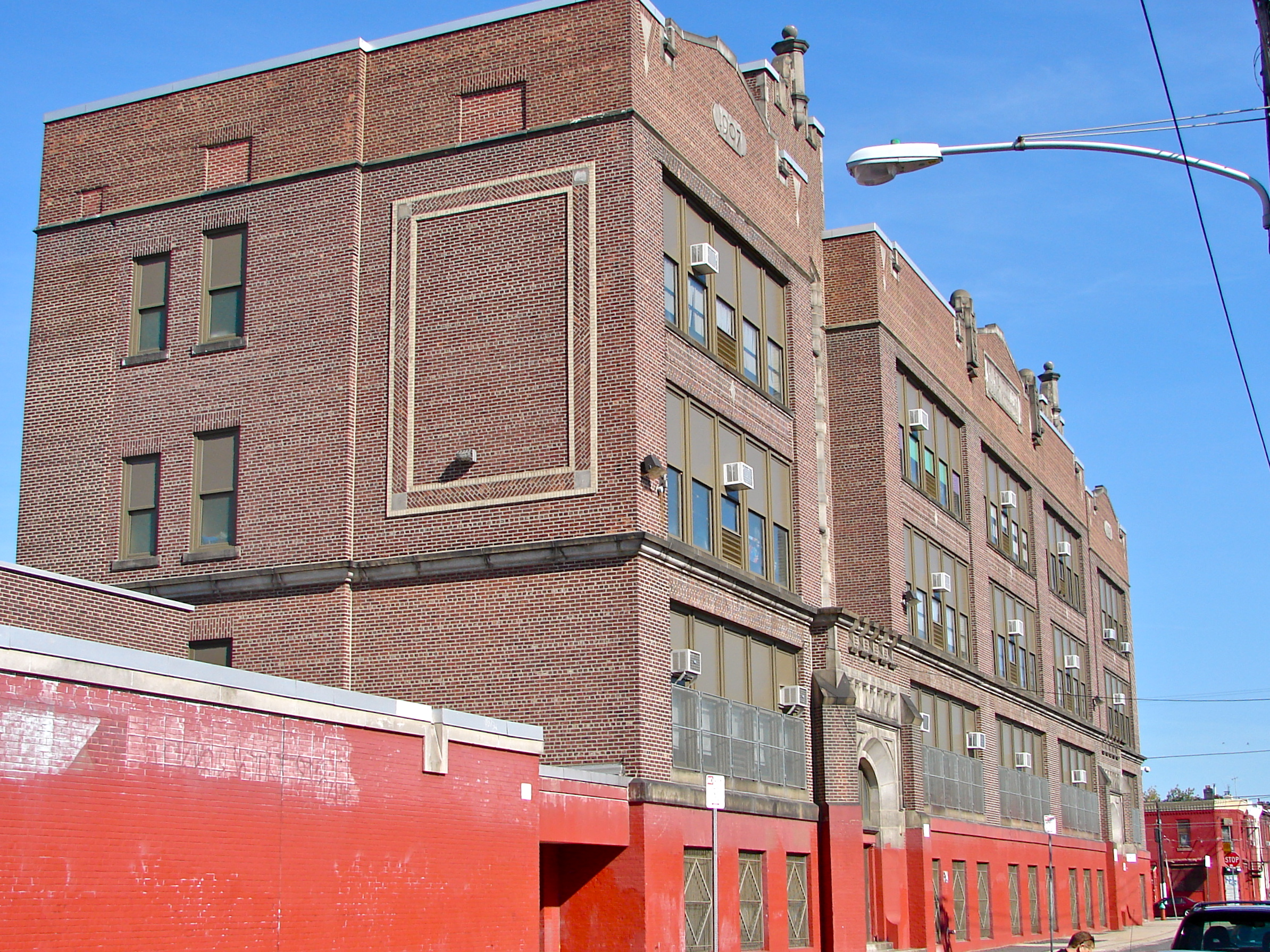
- Bayard Taylor School, September 2010

- Location within Philadelphia Location within Pennsylvania Location within the United States
- Location: 3698 N. Randolph St., Philadelphia, Pennsylvania
- Coordinates: 40°0′25″N 75°8′19″W
- Area: 2.5 acres (1.0 ha)
- Built: 1907–1908
- Built by: David Peoples
- Architect: Henry deCourcy Richards
- Architectural style: Colonial Revival, Late Gothic Revival
- MPS: Philadelphia Public Schools TR
- NRHP reference No.: 88002329
- Added to NRHP: November 18, 1988

Bayard Taylor School is a historic elementary school located in the Hunting Park neighborhood of Philadelphia, Pennsylvania. It is part of the School District of Philadelphia. The building was designed by Henry deCourcy Richards and built in 1907–1908. It is a three-story, seven-bay, brick building with a raised basement in the Colonial Revival / Late Gothic Revival-style. It features an ornate entrance pavilion, stone detailing, and a brick parapet. The school was named for poet and author Bayard Taylor (1825–1878).

The building was added to the National Register of Historic Places in 1988.
