= Alexander K. McClure School =

- U.S. National Register of Historic Places
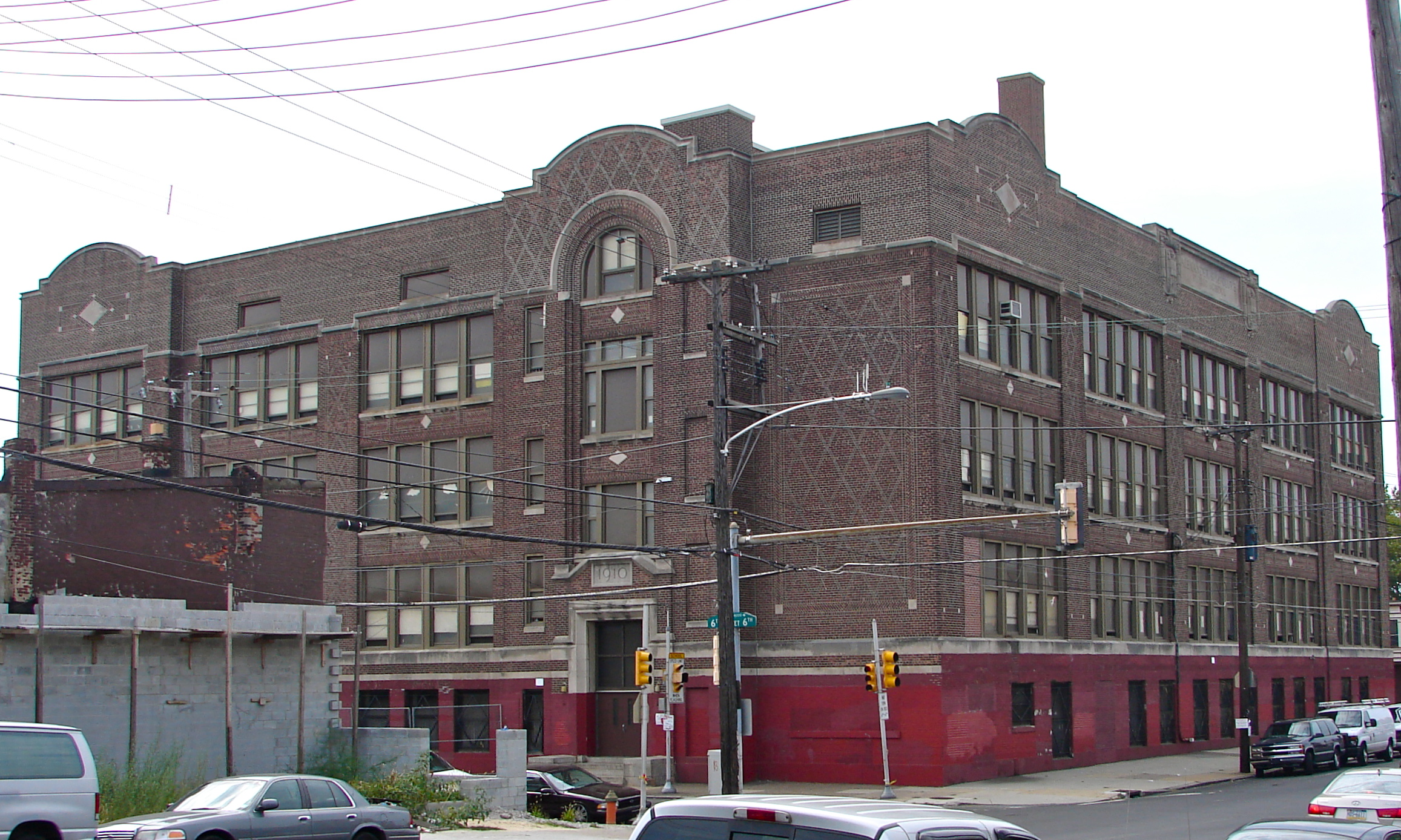
- Alexander K. McClure School, September 2010

- Location within Philadelphia Location within Pennsylvania Location within the United States
- Location: 600 West Hunting Park Ave., Philadelphia, Pennsylvania
- Coordinates: 40°0′54″N 75°8′17″W
- Area: 2.5 acres (1.0 ha)
- Built: 1910–1911
- Built by: Cramp & Co.
- Architect: Henry deCourcy Richards
- Architectural style: Colonial Revival
- MPS: Philadelphia Public Schools TR
- NRHP reference No.: 88002300
- Added to NRHP: November 18, 1988

Alexander K. McClure School is a historic elementary school located in the Hunting Park neighborhood of Philadelphia, Pennsylvania. It is part of the School District of Philadelphia. The building was designed by Henry deCourcy Richards and built in 1910–1911. It is a three-story, five-bay, brick building with a raised basement in the Colonial Revival-style. It features a three-story, rounded arched opening above the entrance, stone trim, and a rounded parapet. An addition was built in 1967. The school was named for journalist and politician Alexander Kelly McClure.

The building was added to the National Register of Historic Places in 1988.
