= Midian Othello Bousfield =

Midian Othello Bousfield (August 22, 1885 – February 16, 1948) was an African American physician. His work often focused on public health and expanding care for Black patients. Bousfield set up the first all-Black United States Army hospital at Fort Huachuca.

== Biography ==
Bousfield was born in Tipton, Missouri, on August 22, 1885. He was raised in Kansas City, Missouri. Early on, he worked as a barber, like his father.

In 1907, he graduated from the University of Kansas with a bachelor's degree. Bousfield went on to study medicine at Northwestern University Medical School, graduating in 1909. He was a member of Sigma Pi Phi. After he earned his medical degree, he worked as an intern at the Freedman's hospital in Washington. In 1910, he completed his internship and traveled to Brazil in 1911. During his time in Brazil, he looked for business opportunities, but these did not work out as expected and he returned to Kansas City in 1912.

After traveling, he raised money to open his own practice by working for the railroads as a barber and a porter. In Kansas City, he became a visiting physician at the City's General Hospital. Bousfield was one of the first Black physicians to work at the city's General Hospital. On September 9, 1914, Bousfield married Maudelle Brown and the couple later had a daughter. In 1914, he and the family moved to Chicago.

Bousfield worked as a school health officer and tuberculosis physician in Chicago until around 1916. Between 1915 and 1920, he worked as the secretary for the Railway Men's Association, an African American labor union that later became the Brotherhood of Sleeping Car Porters. Bousfield left and became part of a Black-owned business which created the Liberty Life Insurance Company in 1919. Around the mid-1920s, he became the president of the company. In 1929, the company merged to become Supreme Liberty Life and Bousfield continued his involvement with them throughout his life.

Bousfield's work in the 1930s moved towards public health. He was a medical consultant to the United States Children's Bureau and the Chicago Board of Health. He set up infant paralysis units at both Tuskegee Institute and at the Provident Hospital. Bousfield was the director of the Negro Health Program of the Julius Rosenwald Fund and in this capacity, helped many Black medical professionals earn their degrees. At the fund, he was also involved with influencing public opinion on health issues facing Black Americans. Bousfield served as the president of the National Medical Association (NMA) between 1933 and 1934. During that year, he was the first Black speaker at the annual meeting of the American Public Health Association. At this speech, "In no uncertain terms he charged that health officials in the North and South paid little attention to the health of blacks." In 1936, Bousfield became the president of the Chicago Urban League. In 1939, he became the first African American appointed to the Chicago Board of Education.

In 1942, Bousfield joined the United States Army as a medical officer. Bousfield was named head of the all Black medical unit at Fort Huachuca. This was the first all-Black Army hospital and was large, well-equipped and had over 100 beds. He was promoted to colonel and became the first Black colonel in the Army Medical Corps. During his time in the Army, he was criticized by the NMA which felt that the hospital upheld segregationist policies. Bousfield left the military in 1945. In 1946, he was awarded the Legion of Merit.

Bousfield died in his home in Chicago of a heart attack on February 16, 1948.
