= J. Roy Carroll Jr. =

American architect (1904–1990)

- Born: September 25, 1904; Philadelphia
- Died: July 18, 1990 (aged 85); Chester, Pennsylvania
- Occupation: Architect

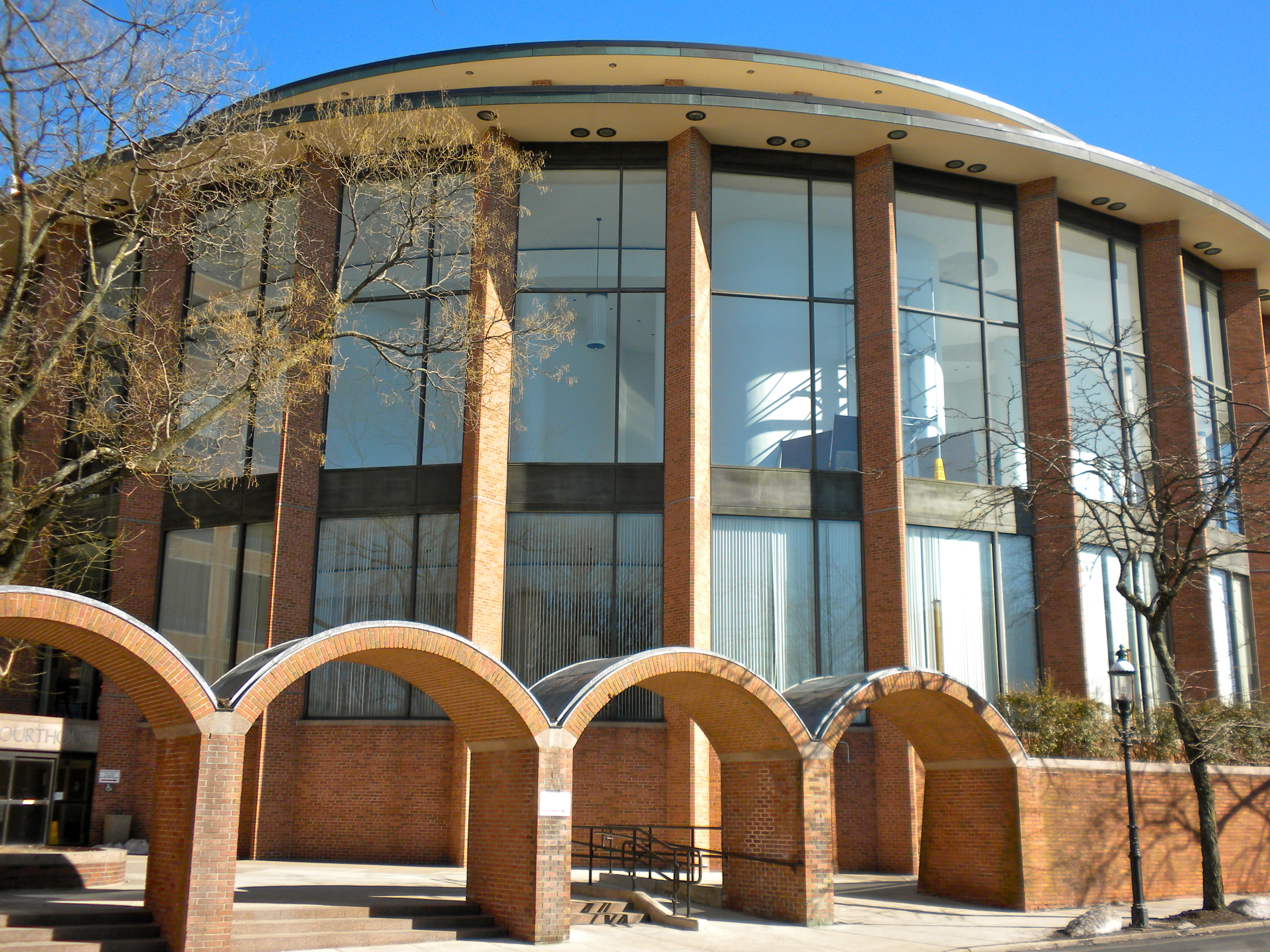
The Bucks County Courthouse in Doylestown, Pennsylvania, completed in 1962.

The Orville Wright Federal Building in Washington, D.C., completed in 1963.

The William J. Green Jr. Federal Building (right) and James A. Byrne United States Courthouse (left), completed in 1973 and 1975, respectively.

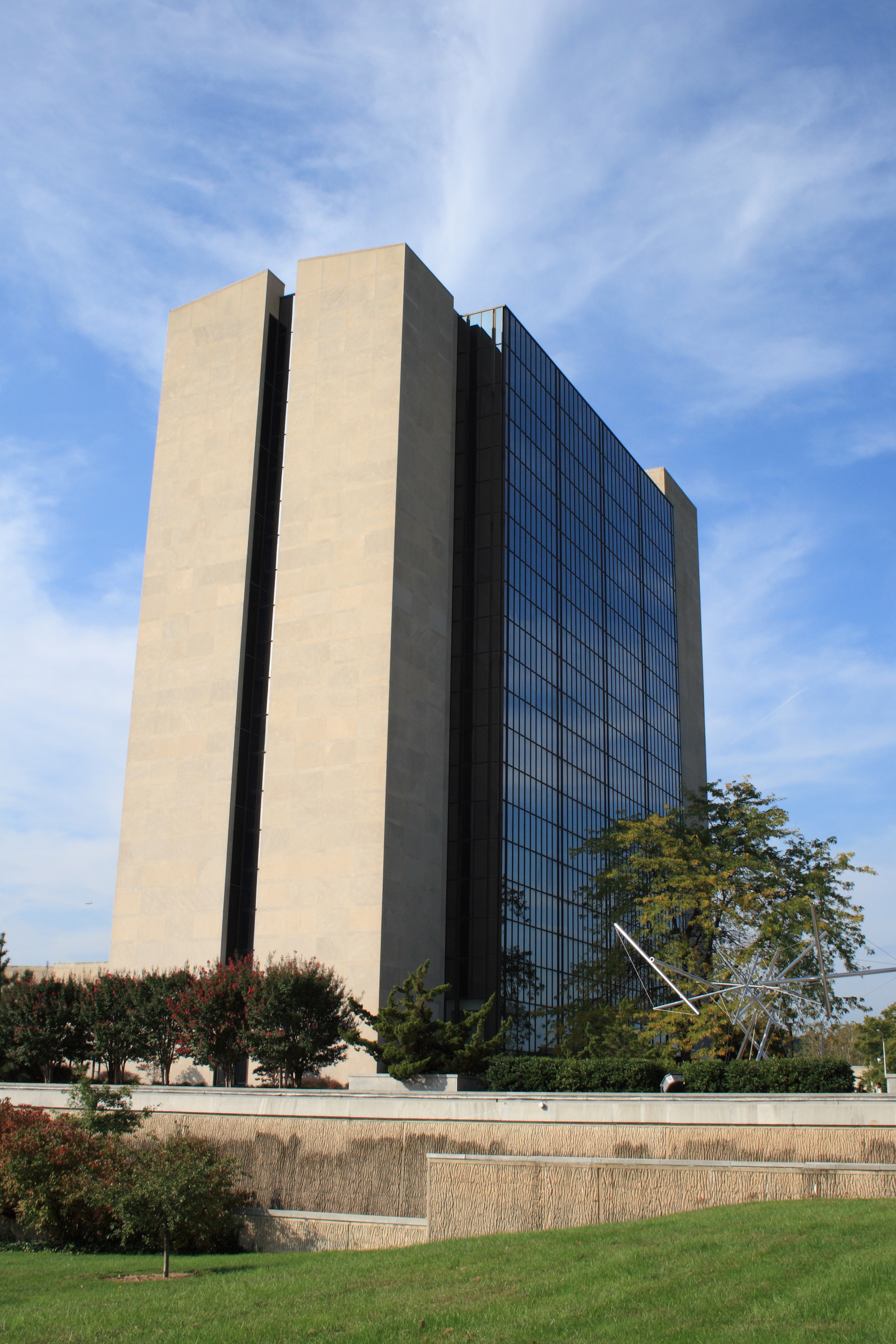
The Lister Hill National Center for Biomedical Communications in Bethesda, Maryland, completed in 1980.

J. Roy Carroll Jr. FAIA (1904–1990) was an American architect in practice in Philadelphia from 1935 to 1985. He was president of the American Institute of Architects from 1963 to 1964.

== Life and career ==
Jefferson Roy Carroll Jr. was born September 25, 1904, in Philadelphia. He was educated at West Philadelphia High School and the University of Pennsylvania, graduating in 1928 with an M.Arch. During school vacations he worked for Bunting & Shrigley, DeArmond, Ashmead & Bickley and Harry Sternfeld. He rejoined Sternfeld after his graduation, and was later made an associate in his firm, and was also employed as an instructor in architecture at Penn. He left Sternfeld in 1935 to open his own office, and in 1940 was appointed assistant professor of architecture at Penn. In 1941 he was awarded the Henry Gillette Woodman Traveling Scholarship to study the practice of industrial design under wartime conditions and needs, and upon his return reorganized the university's design department to meet those needs. He resigned from the university in 1945 to focus on practice, forming a partnership with John T. Grisdale. In 1946 it was expanded to include William L. Van Alen. They worked together in the firm of Carroll, Grisdale & Van Alen until 1974, when Carroll reorganized the practice as J. Roy Carroll Jr. & Partners with Elisha Safford Jr., Joseph C. Didinger, George C. Felton, Clarke Bachman and Collins S. Keller. This firm was dissolved in 1977, and Carroll practiced independently until his retirement in 1985.

Carroll joined the American Institute of Architects in 1936, and was elected a Fellow in 1954. He filled several local and regional offices of the AIA, serving as founding president of the Pennsylvania Society of Architects in 1945–46, Philadelphia chapter president in 1952–53 and Mid-Atlantic regional director for 1956–59. In 1959 he was elected secretary of the national organization and as first vice president in 1962. In 1963 he was elected to a single term as president. During Carroll's presidency, the AIA initiated the process to construct the new AIA Headquarters, which would not be completed until 1973. His service continued after his presidency, serving as president of the AIA Foundation from 1964 to 1968 and as chancellor of the College of Fellows in 1968–69. Carroll was also made an honorary member of the Royal Architectural Institute of Canada, the Society of Architects of Mexico and the Philippine Institute of Architects and in 1976 was elected a Benjamin Franklin fellow of the Royal Society of Arts.

== Personal life ==
Carroll was married twice: first to Doris Packard, who died in 1980, and second to Ann Haggerty. He had three children, all with his first wife. He lived in Swarthmore, and died July 18, 1990, in a hospital in Chester.

== Architectural works ==
=== Carroll, Grisdale & Van Alen, 1946–1974 ===
- Terminals B and C, Philadelphia International Airport (1947–53)
- Youth Study Center, Philadelphia 2020 Pennsylvania Ave, (1952, demolished 2008)
- Linwood Heights United Methodist Church, 1627 Chichester Ave, Linwood, Pennsylvania (1954)
- Pennsylvania State Office Building (former), (Note: Designed in association with Harbeson, Hough, Livingston & Larson, Nolen & Swinburne and Ian McHarg.) 1400 Spring Garden St, Philadelphia (1957–58, NRHP 2010)
- Bucks County Courthouse, (Note: Designed in association with Fred F. Martin of Doylestown.) 55 E Court St, Doylestown, Pennsylvania (1958–62)
- Wilbur Wright and Orville Wright Federal Office Buildings, (Note: Designed in association with Holabird & Root of Chicago.) 600 and 800 Independence Ave SW, Washington, D.C. (1961–63)
- American Society for Testing and Materials headquarters (former), 1916 Race St, Philadelphia (1964)
- Franklin Building, University of Pennsylvania, Philadelphia (1964–67)
- Library Company of Philadelphia Ridgway Library, 1314 Locust St, Philadelphia (1965–66)
- William J. Green Jr. Federal Building, (Note: Designed in association with Stewart, Noble, Class & Partners and Bellante & Clauss.) 600 Arch St, Philadelphia (1968–73)
- Prentiss House, 1834 Arch St, Philadelphia (1970, demolished)
- James A. Byrne United States Courthouse, 601 Market St, Philadelphia (1970–75)

=== J. Roy Carroll Jr. & Partners, 1974–1977 ===
- Lister Hill National Center for Biomedical Communications, 8600 Rockville Pike, Bethesda, Maryland (1977–80)
