= W. Leonard Evans Jr. =

African American businessman (1914–2007)

- Born: William Leonard Evans Jr. c. 1914; Louisville, Kentucky, U.S.
- Died: May 22, 2007 (aged 92–93); Tucson, Arizona, U.S.
- Education: University of Illinois
- Occupation: Businessman
- Spouse: Maudelle Bousfield (m. 1936)
- Children: 2
- Family: Maudelle Bousfield (mother-in-law)

William Leonard Evans Jr. (c. 1914 – May 22, 2007) was an African American businessman whose enterprises included Tuesday magazine and the National Negro Network.

== Biography ==
=== Early life and education ===
He was born William Leonard Evans Jr. in Louisville, Kentucky, the son of William L. Evans Sr. and Beatrice Evans. His father was an architect and secretary of the National Urban League. After two years at Fisk University, Evans transferred to the University of Illinois, where he graduated with a degree in business in 1935.

=== Career ===
==== Advertising ====
In the 1940s, as a member of the Associated Publishers newspaper representatives, Evans was part of "one of the first extensive studies to examine the purchasing habits of black consumers in Baltimore, Philadelphia, and Washington, D.C." Following his work with Associated Publishers, Evans had his own advertising agency (Evans and Durham, Inc.) in New York City before joining Arthur Meyerhoff & Company as an advertising executive in Chicago. After four years with Meyerhoff, "Evans reduced his role at the firm and opened a second agency in Chicago ... [and] created Negro market campaigns for companies such as Pet Milk, Philip Morris cigarettes, Wrigley gum, and Armour meat products."

==== National Negro Network ====
In December 1953, while Evans was an account supervisor at the Meyerhoff agency, he organized the National Negro Network of radio stations. The network was "composed of approximately 40 basic stations" and was expected "to reach approximately 12 million of the 15 million Negroes in America." The network operated just over a year before Evans ended it because of insufficient advertising.

==== Tuesday Publications ====
Evans began Tuesday magazine in 1965, with the formation of Tuesday Publications. He chose that name because Tuesday was "the traditional press day for Negro weeklies". The publication "featured positive stories on African American life, politics, and culture." Evans, who was the magazine's editor and publisher, summarized the magazine's role by saying, "Look and Life are basically published for whites but also read by Negros. Tuesday is basically published for Negros and read by whites too."

Tuesday was inserted as a supplement every other month in nine metropolitan general-circulation newspapers, including the Chicago Sun-Times, the Milwaukee Journal-Sentinel and the Philadelphia Sunday Bulletin. Its first printing "reached over 1.3 million homes". The magazine's success led to a spinoff, Tuesday at Home, which began in 1970. Evans' entry in The Kentucky African American Encyclopedia summarized the combined success of the two publications:

By 1973, the two magazines were inserted into the Sunday editions of 23 major newspapers, including the Chicago Tribune, and reached over 4.5 million subscribers. At its peak in the early 1970s, Tuesday Publications was the 29th-largest black-owned business in the United States, based on gross revenues, and the second largest of the nine devoted to communications.

An economic slump in the late 1970s ended both the magazines' success and the company itself.

==== Civic activities and recognition ====
In 1971, Evans was elected to the board of trustees of the University of Chicago. In 1975, Evans received the University of Illinois Alumni Association's Alumni Achievement Award, which "is presented to those alumni who have attained outstanding success and national or international distinction in their chosen profession or life's work, and whose accomplishments reflect admirably on or bring honor to their Alma Mater."

== Personal life and death ==
Evans was married to Maudelle Bousfield from 1936 until his death. Together they had two sons, Leonard and Midian. Evans' mother in law was Maudelle Bousfield, who was noted as the first African-American principal within the Chicago Public Schools district. Evans died on May 22, 2007, in Tucson, Arizona, following a stroke. He was survived by his wife and two sons.
