= 1988 Pennsylvania Attorney General election =

- November 8, 1988

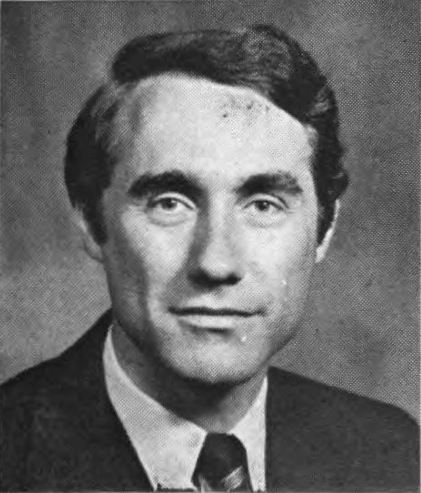
Nominee	Ernie Preate	Edward Mezvinsky
Party	Republican	Democratic
Popular vote	2,183,021	2,040,535
Percentage	50.88%	47.56%
Attorney General before election
LeRoy Zimmerman
Republican
Elected Attorney General
Ernie Preate
Republican

The 1988 Pennsylvania Attorney General election was held on November 8, 1988, in order to elect the Attorney General of Pennsylvania. Republican nominee and Lackawanna County district attorney, Ernie Preate, defeated Democratic nominee and former U.S. representative from the state of Iowa, Edward Mezvinsky.

== General election ==
On election day, November 8, 1988, Republican nominee Ernie Preate won the election by a margin of 142,686 votes against his main opponent, Democratic nominee Edward Mezvinsky.

=== Results ===
Pennsylvania Attorney General election, 1988
Party	Candidate	Votes	%
Republican	Ernie Preate	2,183,021	50.88%
Democratic	Edward Mezvinsky	2,040,535	47.56%
Consumer Party	Arthur Liebersohn	31,108	0.73%
Libertarian	Daniel Mulholland	18,459	0.43%
Populist	Kathryn Meiner	17,274	0.40%
Total votes		4,290,397	100.00%
Republican hold			
