= Gottlieb v. Tropicana Hotel & Casino =

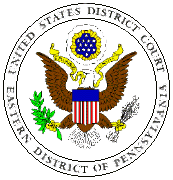
- Full case name: Rena Gottlieb, et al.v. Tropicana Hotel and Casino v. Redland Insurance Co., et al.
- Decided: July 5, 2000
- Counsel for plaintiff: Feldman, Shepherd, Wohlgelernter

Holding
- Participation in a promotional contest is sufficient consideration for a valid contract

Court membership
- Judge sitting: Harvey Bartle III

Gottlieb v. Tropicana Hotel & Casino, 109 F. Supp. 2d 324 (2000) was a decision by the United States District Court for the Eastern District of Pennsylvania, holding that participation in a promotional contest is sufficient consideration for a valid contract.

== Background ==
Rena and Sheldon Gottlieb, who were residents of Pennsylvania, were vacationing at a rented apartment in Atlantic City, New Jersey during the summer of 1999. On July 24, 1999, following dinner with friends, the couple visited the Tropicana Casino. Rena Gottlieb was a member of the casino's "Diamond Club," which requires photo identification and a completed application form for signup. The Diamond Club is free to sign up for, and the casino enters the member's information into their computer database, which is used for advertising purposes. Further, Diamond Club members are given a card, which is swiped every time a member plays one of the Tropicana's casino games.

Once inside the Tropicana, Gottlieb waited in line for approximately five minutes to play the casino's Fun House Million Dollar Wheel Promotion, which offers a variety of prizes, including a $1 million payout. The Tropicana offers Diamond Club members one free spin on the wheel every day; Gottlieb used her membership card for the free spin. Gottlieb contends that the wheel landed on the $1 million prize, but the wheel operator intervened and reactivated the wheel with another member's card, which subsequently landed on a lesser prize of two show tickets. The Tropicana casino claims that the wheel never landed on $1 million, and the attendant never reactivated the wheel.

== Decision ==
=== Summary Judgment ===
The Court affirmed that participation in a contest is considered entering a contract. Since Gottlieb had to drive to the casino, wait in line to spin the wheel, and present her "Diamond Club" card to the casino attendant, she provided consideration to form a contract with the Tropicana Casino. Further, participation in the game provided entertainment for those at the casino, which benefited the Tropicana.

Precedent for the ruling was also found in both New Jersey and Pennsylvania cases, including Lucky Calendar Co. v. Cohen and Cobaugh v. Klick-Lewis, Inc.

=== Jury Trial ===
Since there was no factual evidence, Judge Bartle moved to a jury trial. Two eyewitnesses testified on behalf of Gottlieb claiming they had seen the wheel hit the $1 million jackpot. After a three-day trial, an eight-person jury came back ruling in favor of Gottlieb.
