= Judge Holland =

Judge Holland may refer to:

- H. Russel Holland (born 1936), judge on the United States District Court for the District of Alaska
- James Buchanan Holland (1857–1914), judge of the United States District Court for the Eastern District of Pennsylvania
- John W. Holland (1883–1969), judge of the United States District Court for the Southern District of Florida
