= Wendy Beetlestone =

American judge (born 1961)

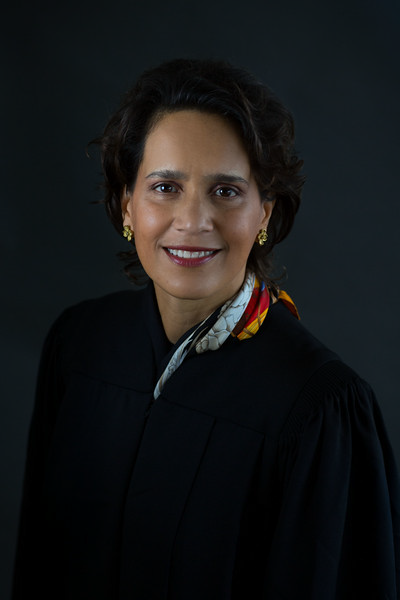

Chief Judge of the United States District Court for the Eastern District of Pennsylvania
- Incumbent
- Assumed office August 2, 2025
- Preceded by: Mitchell S. Goldberg

Chancellor of the University of Liverpool
- Incumbent
- Assumed office July 18, 2023
- Preceded by: Colm Tóibín

Judge of the United States District Court for the Eastern District of Pennsylvania
- Incumbent
- Assumed office November 21, 2014
- Appointed by: Barack Obama
- Preceded by: Michael Baylson

Personal details
- Born: 1961 (age 64–65) Ibadan, Nigeria
- Education: University of Liverpool (BA); University of Pennsylvania (JD)

Wendy Beetlestone (born 1961) is the chief United States district judge of the United States District Court for the Eastern District of Pennsylvania.

== Biography ==
Beetlestone was born in Ibadan, Nigeria to a British father, John Beetlestone, who was a chemistry professor at the University of Ibadan, and an American mother, Clare Watson. She attended the International School Ibadan and later Rishworth School in Yorkshire. In 1984, Beetlestone graduated with a Bachelor of Arts degree, cum laude, from the University of Liverpool. After six years as a journalist, with BBC, CNN and Channel 9, Judge Beetlestone decided to pursue a longstanding interest in the law. In 1993, she earned a Juris Doctor from the University of Pennsylvania Law School.

She began her legal career as a law clerk for Judge Robert S. Gawthrop III, of the United States District Court for the Eastern District of Pennsylvania, from 1993 to 1994. From 1994 to 2002, she worked at the law firm of Schnader Harrison Segal & Lewis, LLP, becoming a partner in 2001. From 2002 to 2005, she served as general counsel of the School District of Philadelphia. From 2005 to 2014, she had been a shareholder at the law firm of Hangley Aronchick Segal Pudlin & Schiller, where she litigated commercial matters before both Federal and State courts. In 2023, she was announced as the next chancellor of the University of Liverpool. She is the University’s eleventh chancellor and the institution’s first female and first black chancellor.

=== Federal judicial service ===
On June 16, 2014, President Barack Obama nominated Beetlestone to serve as a United States district judge of the United States District Court for the Eastern District of Pennsylvania, to the seat vacated by Judge Michael Baylson, who assumed senior status on July 13, 2012. On July 24, 2014, a hearing on her nomination was held before the United States Senate Committee on the Judiciary. On September 18, 2014, her nomination was reported out of committee by a voice vote. On November 19, 2014, the United States Senate invoked cloture on her nomination by a 58–38 vote. On November 20, 2014, her nomination was confirmed by a voice vote. She received her judicial commission on November 21, 2014. On August 2, 2025, Beetlestone became chief judge of the Eastern District of Pennsylvania, succeeding Mitchell S. Goldberg.

==== Notable rulings ====
On December 15, 2017, Beetlestone issued a nationwide injunction prohibiting the enforcement of regulations that allowed employers to refuse to cover contraception in their employees' insurance plans if they have either religious objections to birth control or “sincerely held moral convictions” against it. “It is difficult,” Judge Beetlestone wrote, “to comprehend a rule that does more to undermine the contraceptive mandate or that intrudes more into the lives of women.” Judge Beetlestone issued a second nationwide injunction after President Trump issued revised rules. On July 8, 2020, these decisions were overturned by the Supreme Court of the United States.

== See also ==
- List of African-American federal judges
- List of African-American jurists

Legal offices
Preceded by Michael Baylson	Judge of the United States District Court for the Eastern District of Pennsylvania; 2014–present	Incumbent
Preceded by Mitchell S. Goldberg	Chief Judge of the United States District Court for the Eastern District of Pennsylvania; 2025–present	Incumbent
