= Judge Katz =

Judge Katz may refer to:

- David A. Katz (1933–2016), judge of the United States District Court for the Northern District of Ohio
- Marvin Katz (1930–2010), judge of the United States District Court for the Eastern District of Pennsylvania
