= Edward G. Smith =

American judge (1961–2023)

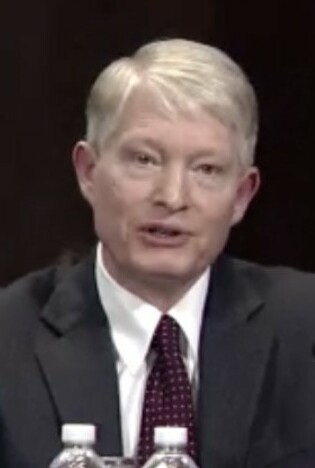
- Smith in 2014

Judge of the United States District Court for the Eastern District of Pennsylvania
- In office March 31, 2014 – November 27, 2023
- Appointed by: Barack Obama
- Preceded by: Berle M. Schiller
- Succeeded by: Catherine Henry

Personal details
- Born: September 17, 1961 Fort Knox, Kentucky, U.S.
- Died: November 27, 2023 (aged 62)
- Party: Republican
- Spouse: Jennifer Ireland
- Children: 3
- Education: Franklin & Marshall College (BA); Pennsylvania State University (JD)

Military service
- Allegiance: United States
- Branch/service: United States Navy
- Years of service: 1984–1990 (active); 1990–2023 (reserves)
- Rank: Captain
- Unit: Judge Advocate General's Corps
- Commands: Naval Reserve Naval Justice School
- Awards: Bronze Star

Edward George Smith (September 17, 1961 – November 27, 2023) was a United States district judge of the United States District Court for the Eastern District of Pennsylvania.

== Early life and education ==
Smith was born in Fort Knox, Kentucky, on September 17, 1961. He attended Easton Area High School in Easton, Pennsylvania. He received a BA degree in 1983 from Franklin and Marshall College. He received a Juris Doctor, cum laude, in 1986 from Penn State Dickinson Law.

== Career ==
He was a 27-year year veteran of the United States Navy Judge Advocate General's Corps, holding the rank of Captain and served as Commanding Officer of the Naval Reserve Naval Justice School. He has served as a military trial judge and military appellate judge and earned the Bronze Star for service in Iraq without V device for valor. He began his career as an Assistant Force Judge Advocate in Norfolk, Virginia and then served as a Senior Trial Defense Counsel for two years in Philadelphia, representing Navy and Marine personnel in various matters. From 1990 to 2002, he was a partner at the law firm of DeRaymond & Smith in Easton, Pennsylvania.

From 2002 to 2014, he served on the Pennsylvania Court of Common Pleas in Northampton County, Pennsylvania, handling both civil and criminal matters.

Smith ran for Congress as a conservative Republican in 1996, seeking to represent Pennsylvania's 15th congressional district. He lost the Republican primary.

=== Federal judicial service ===
On August 1, 2013, President Barack Obama nominated Smith to serve as a United States district judge of the United States District Court for the Eastern District of Pennsylvania, to the seat vacated by Judge Berle M. Schiller, who assumed senior status on June 18, 2012. Smith was nominated as part of a bipartisan package of judicial nominees which included Gerald McHugh. On January 16, 2014, his nomination was reported out of committee by a voice vote. On March 13, 2014 Senate Majority Leader Harry Reid filed a motion to invoke cloture on the nomination. On March 26, 2014, the United States Senate invoked cloture on his nomination by a 75–23 vote. He was confirmed later that day by a 69–31 vote. Notably, he received more "aye" votes from Republican senators than from Democratic senators. He received his commission on March 31, 2014.

In August 2017, Smith upheld a Boyertown Area School District policy guaranteeing transgender students use of their preferred locker room.

== Personal life and death ==
Smith was married to Jennifer Ireland and had three sons and two stepsons. He was from Easton, Pennsylvania, where he attended Easton Area High School; at the time of his death, he was a resident of nearby Plainfield Township.

Smith died on November 27, 2023, at the age of 62.

Legal offices
Preceded by Berle M. Schiller	Judge of the United States District Court for the Eastern District of Pennsylvania; 2014–2023	Succeeded by Catherine Henry
