= 1992 Pennsylvania Attorney General election =

- November 3, 1992

Nominee	Ernie Preate	Joe Kohn
Party	Republican	Democratic
Popular vote	2,313,397	2,187,792
Percentage	50.35%	47.62%
- Preate: 40–50% 50–60% 60–70% 70–80% 80–90% >90% Kohn: 40–50% 50–60% 60–70% 70–80% 80–90% >90% Tie: 40–50% 50% No Data
Attorney General before election
Ernie Preate
Republican
Elected Attorney General
Ernie Preate
Republican

The 1992 Pennsylvania Attorney General election was held on November 3, 1992, in order to elect the Attorney General of Pennsylvania. Incumbent attorney general Republican Ernie Preate defeated Democratic nominee Joe Kohn.

== General election ==
On election day, November 3rd, 1992, Republican nominee Ernie Preate won the election by a margin of 142,686 votes against his main opponent, Democratic nominee Joe Kohn.

=== Results ===
Pennsylvania Attorney General election, 1992
Party	Candidate	Votes	%
Republican	Ernie Preate (incumbent)	2,313,397	50.35%
Democratic	Joe Kohn	2,187,792	47.62%
Libertarian	John Ewbank	92,988	2.02%
Total votes		4,193,001	100.00%
Republican hold			
