= Paul S. Diamond =

American judge (born 1953)

Judge of the United States District Court for the Eastern District of Pennsylvania
- Incumbent
- Assumed office June 22, 2004
- Appointed by: George W. Bush
- Preceded by: Herbert J. Hutton

Personal details
- Born: Paul Steven Diamond; January 2, 1953 (age 73) Brooklyn, New York, U.S.
- Education: Columbia University (BA); University of Pennsylvania (JD)

Paul Steven Diamond (born January 2, 1953) is a United States district judge of the United States District Court for the Eastern District of Pennsylvania and a former federal judicial nominee to be a judge on the United States Court of Appeals for the Third Circuit. He was appointed a federal judge by George W. Bush in 2004.

== Education ==
Diamond was born in Brooklyn. He received a Bachelor of Arts degree from Columbia University in 1974 and a Juris Doctor from the University of Pennsylvania Law School in 1977.

== Career ==
Diamond was an assistant district attorney in the Philadelphia County District Attorney's Office from 1977–1979. In 1980 he served as a law clerk to Pennsylvania Supreme Court Justice Bruce W. Kauffman, who would later also be appointed as a judge on the Eastern District by President Bill Clinton. Diamond returned to the District Attorney's Office from 1981 to 1983. He worked in private practice in Philadelphia from 1983 to 2004, when he was appointed by President George W. Bush to the Eastern District. Diamond also has worked as an adjunct professor of law at Temple University Beasley School of Law from 1990–1992. From 1993 until 1995, Diamond worked as the treasurer and as the counsel for the failed 1996 presidential campaign of United States Senator Arlen Specter.

=== Federal judicial service ===
On January 20, 2004, President George W. Bush nominated Diamond to a seat on the United States District Court for the Eastern District of Pennsylvania vacated by Herbert J. Hutton. Diamond was confirmed by the United States Senate on June 16, 2004 and received his commission on June 22, 2004.

=== Third Circuit nomination under Bush ===
On July 2, 2008, the Legal Intelligencer reported that as part of a package of judicial nominees, President Bush had agreed to withdraw his then nominee to the United States Court of Appeals for the Third Circuit, Gene E. K. Pratter and replace her with Diamond. On July 24, 2008, President Bush formally nominated Diamond to the United States Court of Appeals for the Third Circuit, in conjunction with Pratter's withdrawal. Since Diamond was nominated after July 1, 2008, the unofficial start date of the Thurmond Rule during a presidential election year, no hearings were scheduled on his nomination, and the nomination was returned to Bush at the end of his term.

=== Presidential election cases ===
- In 2016, Judge Diamond rejected Jill Stein's request for a recount of Donald Trump's victory in Pennsylvania.
- During the 2020 presidential election, Judge Diamond heard arguments from the Trump campaign who were seeking to stop Philadelphia's election board from counting remaining ballots. He advised the two parties to reach an agreement and he then dismissed the case without prejudice.

== Sources ==
Legal offices
Preceded by Herbert J. Hutton	Judge of the United States District Court for the Eastern District of Pennsylvania; 2004–present	Incumbent
