= Huyett =

Huyett may refer to:

- Daniel Henry Huyett III (1921–1998), United States federal judge
- Huyett, Maryland (also known as Huyetts Crossroads), unincorporated community in western Washington County, Maryland, United States

== See also ==
- Houyet
