= Eduardo C. Robreno =

American judge (born 1945)

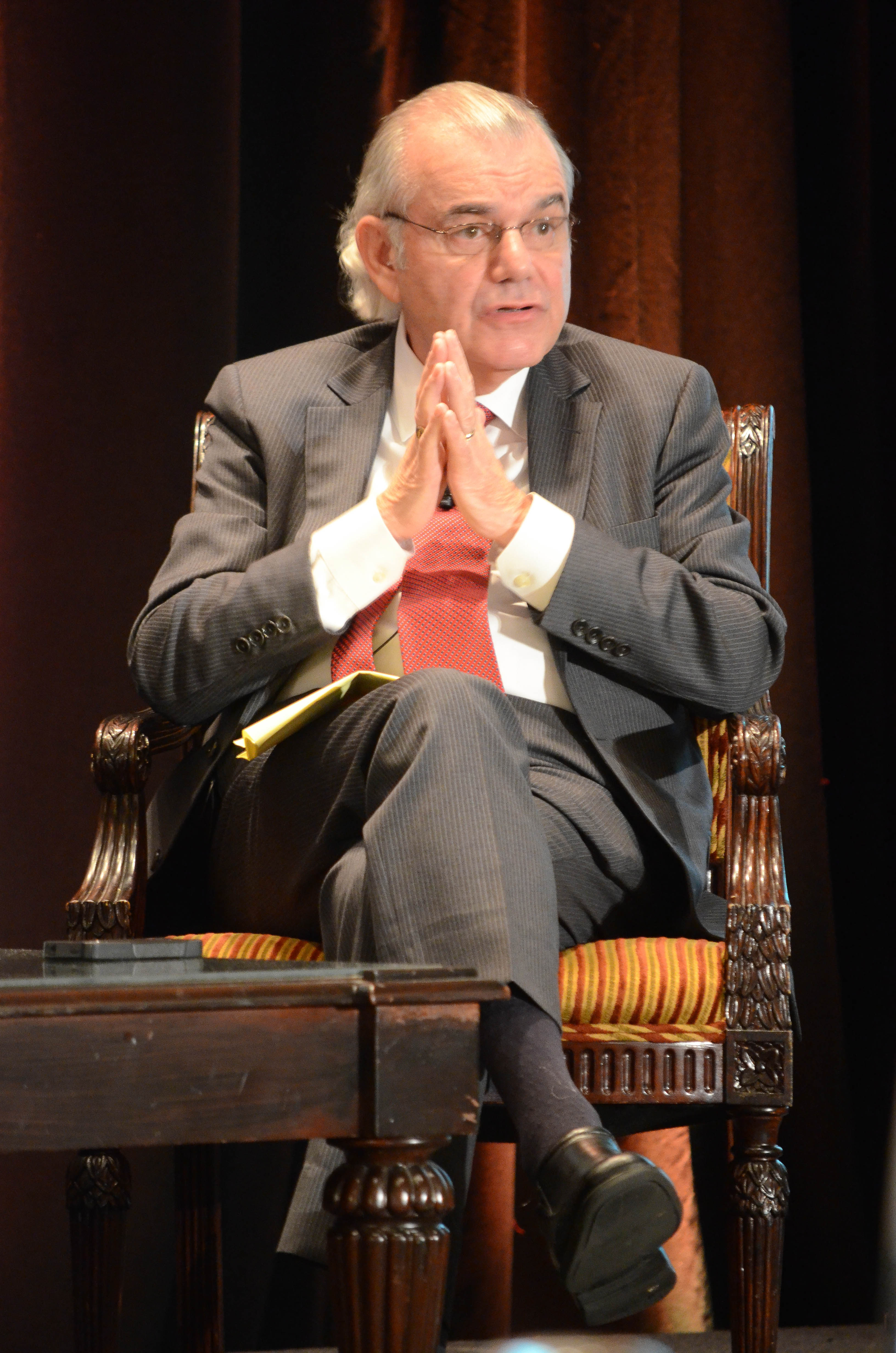
- Judge Eduardo Robreno by Brehon Law Society, Philadelphia, PA, October 11, 2012

Senior Judge of the United States District Court for the Eastern District of Pennsylvania
- In office August 31, 2013 – August 31, 2023

Judge of the United States District Court for the Eastern District of Pennsylvania
- In office June 30, 1992 – August 31, 2013
- Appointed by: George H. W. Bush
- Preceded by: Louis H. Pollak
- Succeeded by: Joseph F. Leeson Jr.

Personal details
- Born: 1945 (age 80–81) Havana, Cuba
- Education: Westfield State College (BA); University of Massachusetts Amherst (MA); Rutgers University (JD)

Eduardo C. Robreno (born 1945) is a former United States district judge of the United States District Court for the Eastern District of Pennsylvania and the first Cuban-American to be appointed as a federal judge.

== Education ==
Robreno received his Bachelor of Arts degree from Westfield State College in 1967, a Master of Arts from University of Massachusetts Amherst in 1969 and his Juris Doctor from Rutgers School of Law–Camden in 1978. He served as an attorney for the Antitrust Division of the United States Department of Justice in Philadelphia, from 1978 to 1981. He was in private practice in Philadelphia from 1981 to 1992. He was a lecturer at Rutgers School of Law from 1992 to 1996.

=== Federal judicial service ===
Robreno was nominated by President George H. W. Bush on November 26, 1991, to a seat vacated by Judge Louis H. Pollak. He was confirmed by the United States Senate on June 26, 1992, and received commission on June 30, 1992. He took the oath of office and commenced service on July 27, 1992. He took senior status on August 31, 2013. He retired from active service on August 31, 2023.

=== Multidistrict litigation ===
Robreno was the third judge to manage the massive multidistrict litigation of over 10,000 federal asbestos claims. These claims were all individually transferred over nearly two decades from local state courts on a variety of grounds, and Robreno has been praised for allowing many cases to go forward and have other dormant cases dismissed.

== See also ==
- List of first minority male lawyers and judges in Pennsylvania
- List of first minority male lawyers and judges in the United States
- List of Hispanic and Latino American jurists

== Sources ==
- Eduardo C. Robreno via FindLaw

Legal offices
Preceded by Louis H. Pollak	Judge of the United States District Court for the Eastern District of Pennsylvania; 1992–2013	Succeeded by Joseph F. Leeson Jr.
