= Joseph Simon Lord III =

American judge

Senior Judge of the United States District Court for the Eastern District of Pennsylvania
- In office July 1, 1982 – April 23, 1991

Chief Judge of the United States District Court for the Eastern District of Pennsylvania
- In office 1971–1982
- Preceded by: John W. Lord Jr.
- Succeeded by: Alfred Leopold Luongo

Judge of the United States District Court for the Eastern District of Pennsylvania
- In office September 15, 1961 – July 1, 1982
- Appointed by: John F. Kennedy
- Preceded by: Seat established by 75 Stat. 80
- Succeeded by: Marvin Katz

Personal details
- Born: Joseph Simon Lord III; May 21, 1912 Philadelphia, Pennsylvania
- Died: April 23, 1991 (aged 78) Philadelphia, Pennsylvania
- Education: University of Pennsylvania (A.B.); University of Pennsylvania Law School (LL.B.)

Joseph Simon Lord III (May 21, 1912 – April 23, 1991) was a United States district judge of the United States District Court for the Eastern District of Pennsylvania.

== Education and career ==
Born in the Germantown neighborhood of Philadelphia, Pennsylvania, Lord received an Artium Baccalaureus degree from the University of Pennsylvania in 1933, where he was captain of the boxing team his senior year. He received a Bachelor of Laws from the University of Pennsylvania Law School in 1936. Lord was in private practice in Philadelphia from 1936 to 1961, interrupted by service in the United States Navy from 1942 to 1945. When he returned to Philadelphia after his military service, Lord became a partner in Richter, Lord & Levy. While in private practice, Lord defended several unpopular clients, ranging from Communists during the McCarthy era (who were acquitted on appeal), to Philadelphia's democratic boss William J. Green Jr. He became the United States Attorney for the Eastern District of Pennsylvania for a brief period in 1961.

== Federal judicial service ==
Lord was nominated by President John F. Kennedy on August 31, 1961, to the United States District Court for the Eastern District of Pennsylvania, to a new seat authorized by 75 Stat. 80. He was confirmed by the United States Senate on September 14, 1961, and received his commission on September 15, 1961. He was a member of the Judicial Panel on Multidistrict Litigation from 1968 to 1978. He served as Chief Judge from 1971 to 1982. He assumed senior status on July 1, 1982. His service terminated on April 23, 1991, due to his death in Philadelphia.

=== Notable cases and judicial anecdotes ===
In 1967, Lord agreed with the National Association for the Advancement of Colored People and invalidated a clause in the 1831 will of philanthropist Stephen Girard, which had restricted scholarships at Girard College to "poor, white, fatherless boys". Lord also infuriated Philadelphia mayor James Tate by interpreting the First Amendment to invalidate the city's refusal to allow anti-Vietnam War groups to use John F. Kennedy Stadium in Philadelphia for a rock concert. In 1971 Lord overturned a recently passed state law that cut off loans or scholarships to students for "moral turpitude", viewing that legislative response to student protests illegal. The following year, Lord struck down a national wiretap law as illegal.

One of his favorite stories involved a golf game after the judge (a prominent liberal) issued a decision invalidating parochial school vouchers. When Lord asked Cardinal John Krol (well known for his conservative views) what his handicap was, Krol quipped back, "you are." In Randazzo v. Eagle-Picher Industries, Inc., 117 F.R.D. 557 (ED Pa 1987), Lord famously wrote, "Counsel brazenly, discourteously, defiantly, arrogantly, insultingly and under the circumstances rather obtusely threw back into my face the very allegations I had held insufficient by reiterating and incorporating those same crippled paragraphs. The so-called 'amended complaint' itself cheekily informs me that these paragraphs allege the states of incorporation or principal places of business of the defendant corporations. Of course, any law school student knows that both the state of incorporation and principal place of business must be diverse, but I suppose I can hardly expect any more from counsel whose familiarity with Title 28 U.S.C. § 1332 could be no more than a friendly wave from a distance visible only through a powerful telescope".

Legal offices
Preceded by Seat established by 75 Stat. 80	Judge of the United States District Court for the Eastern District of Pennsylvania; 1961–1982	Succeeded by Marvin Katz
Preceded by John W. Lord Jr.	Chief Judge of the United States District Court for the Eastern District of Pennsylvania; 1971–1982	Succeeded by Alfred Leopold Luongo
