= Robert F. Kelly =

American judge (born 1935)

Senior Judge of the United States District Court for the Eastern District of Pennsylvania
- Incumbent
- Assumed office July 17, 2001

Judge of the United States District Court for the Eastern District of Pennsylvania
- In office June 26, 1987 – July 17, 2001
- Appointed by: Ronald Reagan
- Preceded by: Donald West VanArtsdalen
- Succeeded by: Michael Baylson

Personal details
- Born: June 17, 1935 (age 90) Rosemont, Pennsylvania, U.S.
- Education: Villanova University (BS); Temple University (LLB)

Robert F. Kelly (born June 17, 1935) is a senior United States district judge of the United States District Court for the Eastern District of Pennsylvania.

== Education and career ==
Kelly was born in Rosemont, Pennsylvania. He received a Bachelor of Science degree from Villanova University in 1957 and a Bachelor of Laws from Temple University School of Law in 1960. He was in private practice in Media, Pennsylvania from 1961 to 1962. He was in private practice in Chester, Pennsylvania from 1962 to 1964. He was in private practice in Media from 1964 to 1976. He was a clerk for Judge Francis J. Catania of the Delaware County Court of Common Pleas from 1964 to 1972. He was the prothonotary of Delaware County from 1972 to 1976. He was the chairman of the Delaware County Republican Executive Committee from 1972 to 1985. He was a judge on the court of common pleas of the 32nd Judicial District of Pennsylvania from 1976 to 1987. In July 1982, Kelly presided over the rape-murder trial of Nick Yarris, resulting in the defendant's wrongful conviction and death sentence, which was not overturned until 2003.

=== Federal judicial service ===
Kelly was nominated by President Ronald Reagan on May 1, 1987, to a seat on the United States District Court for the Eastern District of Pennsylvania vacated by Judge Donald West VanArtsdalen. He was confirmed by the United States Senate on June 25, 1987, and received his commission on June 26, 1987. He assumed senior status on July 17, 2001.

== Sources ==
Legal offices
Preceded by Donald West VanArtsdalen	Judge of the United States District Court for the Eastern District of Pennsylvania; 1987–2001	Succeeded by Michael Baylson
