= John William Ditter Jr. =

American judge (1921–2019)

Senior Judge of the United States District Court for the Eastern District of Pennsylvania
- In office October 19, 1986 – April 7, 2019

Judge of the United States District Court for the Eastern District of Pennsylvania
- In office October 15, 1970 – October 19, 1986
- Appointed by: Richard Nixon
- Preceded by: Seat established by 84 Stat. 294
- Succeeded by: Robert S. Gawthrop III

Personal details
- Born: October 19, 1921 Philadelphia, Pennsylvania
- Died: April 7, 2019 (aged 97) Perkiomenville, Pennsylvania
- Education: Ursinus College (B.A.); University of Pennsylvania Law School (LL.B.)

John William Ditter Jr. (October 19, 1921 – April 7, 2019) was a United States district judge of the United States District Court for the Eastern District of Pennsylvania.

== Education and career ==
Born in Philadelphia, Pennsylvania, the son of Congressman J. William Ditter, he received a Bachelor of Arts degree from Ursinus College in 1943 and served as a captain in the United States Naval Reserve during World War II, from 1943 to 1946. He then received a Bachelor of Laws from the University of Pennsylvania Law School in 1948. He worked as a law clerk for the Court of Common Pleas of Montgomery County, Pennsylvania from 1948 to 1950, and as an assistant district attorney of Montgomery County in 1951. He returned to the United States Naval Reserve from 1951 to 1953, and was again a Montgomery County assistant district attorney from 1953 to 1955, and a first assistant district attorney there from 1956 to 1960. He also maintained a private practice in Ambler, Pennsylvania from 1953 to 1963. He was a judge of the Court of Common Pleas of Montgomery County from 1964 to 1970.

== Federal judicial service ==
On September 28, 1970, Ditter was nominated by President Richard Nixon to a new seat on the United States District Court for the Eastern District of Pennsylvania created by 84 Stat. 294. He was confirmed by the United States Senate on October 8, 1970, and received his commission on October 15, 1970.

Judge Ditter assumed senior status on October 19, 1986, and continued to serve as senior judge until his death on April 7, 2019.

== See also ==
- List of United States federal judges by longevity of service

== Sources ==
Legal offices
Preceded by Seat established by 84 Stat. 294	Judge of the United States District Court for the Eastern District of Pennsylvania; 1970–1986	Succeeded by Robert S. Gawthrop III
