= Mitchell S. Goldberg =

American judge (born 1959)

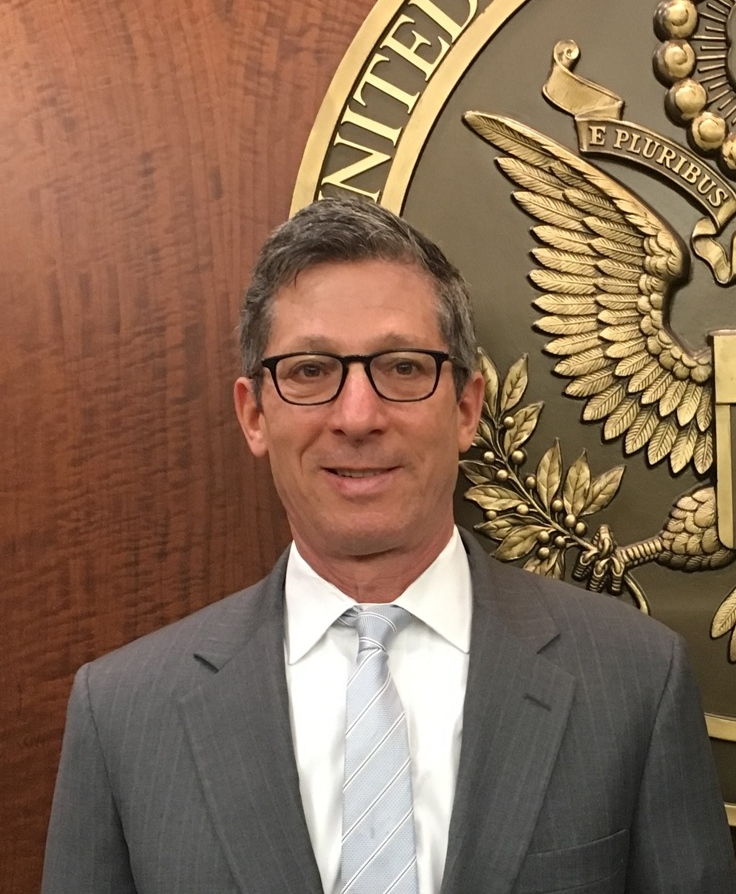

Chief Judge of the United States District Court for the Eastern District of Pennsylvania
- In office March 5, 2024 – August 1, 2025
- Preceded by: Juan Ramon Sánchez
- Succeeded by: Wendy Beetlestone

Judge of the United States District Court for the Eastern District of Pennsylvania
- In office October 31, 2008 – September 19, 2025
- Appointed by: George W. Bush
- Preceded by: John R. Padova
- Succeeded by: Antonio Pozos

Judge of the Court of Common Pleas for Bucks County
- In office 2003–2008

Personal details
- Born: Mitchell Steven Goldberg; 1959 (age 66–67) Philadelphia, Pennsylvania, U.S.
- Spouse: Helene Robins
- Children: 2
- Education: Ithaca College (AB); Temple University (JD)

Mitchell Steven Goldberg (born 1959) is a former United States district judge of the United States District Court for the Eastern District of Pennsylvania. He served as the chief judge of the Eastern District of Pennsylvania from 2024 to 2025.

== Education and career ==
Goldberg was born in Philadelphia. He received an Artium Baccalaureus degree from Ithaca College in 1981 and a Juris Doctor from Temple University Beasley School of Law in 1986. After serving as an assistant district attorney in the Philadelphia District Attorney's Office from 1986 to 1989, he entered private practice in Pennsylvania until 1996. He became an assistant United States attorney in the Eastern District of Pennsylvania in 1997, serving in that position until 2003 when he was elected to a judgeship on the Bucks County Court of Common Pleas. He also taught as an adjunct professor at Temple University Beasley School of Law from 2002 to 2006.

=== Federal judicial service ===
On July 24, 2008, Goldberg was nominated by President George W. Bush to a seat on the United States District Court for the Eastern District of Pennsylvania vacated by John R. Padova. Goldberg was confirmed by the United States Senate by voice vote on September 26, 2008, and he received his commission on October 31, 2008.

On March 5, 2024, Goldberg became Chief Judge of the Eastern District of Pennsylvania, succeeding Juan Ramon Sánchez. Goldberg resigned from that position on August 1, 2025.

On August 26, 2025, it was announced that Goldberg would retire from the court on September 19, 2025.

== See also ==
- List of Jewish American jurists

== Sources ==
Legal offices
Preceded by John R. Padova	Judge of the United States District Court for the Eastern District of Pennsylvania; 2008–2025	Succeeded by Antonio Pozos
Preceded by Juan Ramon Sánchez	Chief Judge of the United States District Court for the Eastern District of Pennsylvania; 2024–2025	Succeeded by Wendy Beetlestone
