= Mary A. McLaughlin =

American judge (born 1946)

Senior Judge of the United States District Court for the Eastern District of Pennsylvania
- In office November 18, 2013 – July 1, 2020

Judge of the United States Foreign Intelligence Surveillance Court
- In office May 18, 2008 – May 18, 2015
- Appointed by: John Roberts
- Preceded by: James G. Carr
- Succeeded by: James Parker Jones

Judge of the United States District Court for the Eastern District of Pennsylvania
- In office May 31, 2000 – November 18, 2013
- Appointed by: Bill Clinton
- Preceded by: Marvin Katz
- Succeeded by: John Milton Younge

Personal details
- Born: Mary Agnes McLaughlin; November 18, 1946 (age 79) Philadelphia, Pennsylvania, U.S.
- Education: Gwynedd-Mercy College (BA); Bryn Mawr College (MA); University of Pennsylvania (JD)

Mary Agnes McLaughlin (born November 18, 1946) is an American lawyer who is a former United States district judge of the United States District Court for the Eastern District of Pennsylvania.

== Education and career ==
Born in Philadelphia, McLaughlin received a Bachelor of Arts degree from Gwynedd-Mercy College in 1968, a Master of Arts from Bryn Mawr College in 1969, and a Juris Doctor from the University of Pennsylvania Law School in 1976. She was a law clerk for Judge Stanley Seymour Brotman 1976 to 1977, and went on to work in private practice from 1977 to 1980. She was an Assistant United States Attorney of the United States Attorney's office for the District of Columbia from 1980 to 1984. She was an assistant professor at the Vanderbilt University School of Law from 1984 to 1986.

After leaving Vanderbilt, McLaughlin returned to private practice for fourteen years, during which time she served as a partner at the law firm of Dechert LLP. She also completed stints as an adjunct professor at both the University of Pennsylvania and Rutgers University law schools. In 1995, McLaughlin was appointed chief counsel to the Senate Subcommittee on Terrorism, Technology and Government (a subcommittee of the Judiciary Committee).

=== Federal judicial service ===
McLaughlin was nominated by President Bill Clinton on March 9, 2000, for a seat on the United States District Court for the Eastern District of Pennsylvania. She was confirmed by the Senate on May 24, 2000, and received her commission on May 31, 2000. She simultaneously served a term on the FISA Court from 2008 to 2015. She assumed senior status on November 18, 2013 and retired on July 1, 2020.

== Sources ==
Legal offices
| Preceded by Marvin Katz | Judge of the United States District Court for the Eastern District of Pennsylvania; 2000–2013 | Succeeded by John Milton Younge |
| Preceded by James G. Carr | Judge of the United States Foreign Intelligence Surveillance Court; 2008–2015 | Succeeded by James Parker Jones |
