= John Milton Younge =

American judge (born 1955)

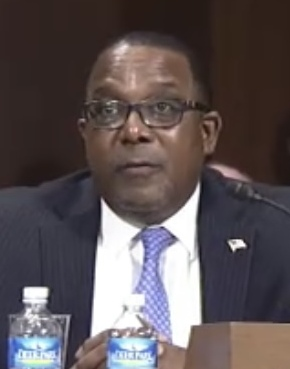

Judge of the United States District Court for the Eastern District of Pennsylvania
- Incumbent
- Assumed office August 20, 2019
- Appointed by: Donald Trump
- Preceded by: Mary A. McLaughlin

Judge of the Philadelphia County Court of Common Pleas
- In office January 1996 – August 20, 2019

Personal details
- Born: 1955 (age 70–71) Philadelphia, Pennsylvania, U.S.
- Party: Democratic
- Education: Boston University (BS); Howard University (JD); University of Nevada, Reno (MJS)

John Milton Younge (born 1955) is a United States district judge of the United States District Court for the Eastern District of Pennsylvania.

== Biography ==
Younge received his Bachelor of Science in 1977 from Boston University, his Juris Doctor in 1981 from Howard University School of Law, and a Master of Judicial Studies in 2011 from the University of Nevada, Reno. He began his legal career as a solo practitioner in Philadelphia from 1982 to 1985. From 1985 to 1995, Younge worked at the Philadelphia Redevelopment Authority, serving as Deputy Executive Director and subsequently as General Counsel from 1991 to 1995. From 1996 to 2019, Younge was a Judge on the Philadelphia County Court of Common Pleas, where he presided over both criminal and civil cases. Younge served on the Ward Executive Committee with the Philadelphia Democratic Party since 1984, when he served on the Ward Executive Committee for the Party. Younge won election to the bench as a Democrat and ran twice unsuccessfully as a Democrat for the Pennsylvania Superior Court.

== Federal judicial service ==
=== Expired nomination to district court under Obama ===
On July 30, 2015, President Barack Obama nominated Younge to serve as a United States district judge of the United States District Court for the Eastern District of Pennsylvania, to the seat vacated by Judge Mary A. McLaughlin, who assumed senior status on November 18, 2013. He received a hearing before the Senate Judiciary Committee on December 9, 2015. His nomination expired on January 3, 2017, with the end of the 114th Congress.

=== Renomination to district court under Trump ===
On July 13, 2018, President Donald Trump announced his intent to nominate Younge to a seat on the United States District Court for the Eastern District of Pennsylvania as part of a bipartisan package of judicial nominees. On July 17, 2018, his nomination was sent to the Senate. President Trump re-nominated Younge to the same seat to which President Obama had previously nominated him.

On January 3, 2019, his nomination was returned to the President under Rule XXXI, Paragraph 6 of the United States Senate. On January 23, 2019, President Trump announced his intent to renominate Younge for a federal judgeship. His nomination was sent to the Senate later that day. On February 7, 2019, his nomination was reported out of committee by a 15–7 vote with the seven negative votes coming from Republicans. On July 31, 2019, the Senate confirmed his nomination by voice vote. He received his judicial commission on August 20, 2019.

== See also ==
- Barack Obama judicial appointment controversies
- List of African-American federal judges
- List of African-American jurists

Legal offices
Preceded by Mary A. McLaughlin	Judge of the United States District Court for the Eastern District of Pennsylvania; 2019–present	Incumbent
