= Donald West VanArtsdalen =

American judge (1919–2019)

Senior Judge of the United States District Court for the Eastern District of Pennsylvania
- In office October 21, 1985 – May 21, 2019

Judge of the United States District Court for the Eastern District of Pennsylvania
- In office October 15, 1970 – October 21, 1985
- Appointed by: Richard Nixon
- Preceded by: Seat established by 84 Stat. 294
- Succeeded by: Robert F. Kelly

Personal details
- Born: Donald West VanArtsdalen; October 21, 1919 Doylestown, Pennsylvania, US
- Died: May 21, 2019 (aged 99) Doylestown, Pennsylvania, US
- Education: University of Pennsylvania (LLB)

Donald West VanArtsdalen (sometimes listed as Van Artsdalen; October 21, 1919 – May 21, 2019) was a senior United States district judge of the United States District Court for the Eastern District of Pennsylvania.

== Education and career ==
Born in Doylestown, Pennsylvania, VanArtsdalen served in the Canadian Army from 1940 to 1942, and as a United States Army sergeant from 1942 to 1945.

He then received a Bachelor of Laws degree from the University of Pennsylvania Law School in 1948, and entered into private practice in Doylestown in 1948, working as a lawyer until 1970. His legal tenure also included a period in which he served as a district attorney for Bucks County, Pennsylvania from 1954 to 1958.

== Federal judicial service ==
On September 10, 1970, President Richard Nixon nominated VanArtsdalen to a new seat on the United States District Court for the Eastern District of Pennsylvania created by 84 Stat. 294. VanArtsdalen was confirmed by the United States Senate on October 8, 1970, and received his commission on October 15, 1970. He assumed senior status on October 21, 1985. He died on May 21, 2019, aged 99, after battling leukemia.

== See also ==
- List of United States federal judges by longevity of service

Legal offices
Preceded by Seat established by 84 Stat. 294	Judge of the United States District Court for the Eastern District of Pennsylvania; 1970–1985	Succeeded by Robert F. Kelly
