= Herbert J. Hutton =

American judge

Senior Judge of the United States District Court for the Eastern District of Pennsylvania
- In office September 6, 2003 – April 8, 2007

Judge of the United States District Court for the Eastern District of Pennsylvania
- In office August 12, 1988 – September 6, 2003
- Appointed by: Ronald Reagan
- Preceded by: Clarence Charles Newcomer
- Succeeded by: Paul S. Diamond

Personal details
- Born: Herbert Jefferson Hutton; November 26, 1937 Philadelphia, Pennsylvania, U.S.
- Died: April 8, 2007 (aged 69) Wynnewood, Pennsylvania, U.S.
- Education: Lincoln University (AB); Temple University (JD)

Herbert Jefferson Hutton (November 26, 1937 – April 8, 2007) was a United States district judge of the United States District Court for the Eastern District of Pennsylvania.

== Education and career ==
Born in Philadelphia, Pennsylvania, Hutton received an Artium Baccalaureus degree from Lincoln University in 1959 and a Juris Doctor from Temple University School of Law in 1962. He was an attorney with the Pennsylvania Housing and Home Finance Agency from 1962 to 1964. He was in private practice in Philadelphia from 1964 to 1988. He was a hearing officer for the Board of Revision of Taxes in Philadelphia from 1982 to 1988.

=== Federal judicial service ===
Hutton was nominated by President Ronald Reagan on May 17, 1988, to a seat on the United States District Court for the Eastern District of Pennsylvania vacated by Judge Clarence Charles Newcomer. He was confirmed by the United States Senate on August 11, 1988, and received his commission on August 12, 1988. He assumed senior status on September 6, 2003. Hutton served in that capacity until his death.

== Personal life and death ==
Hutton died on April 8, 2007, in Wynnewood, Pennsylvania after an extended illness.

== See also ==
- List of African-American federal judges
- List of African-American jurists

== Sources ==
Legal offices
| Preceded by Clarence Charles Newcomer | Judge of the United States District Court for the Eastern District of Pennsylvania; 1988–2003 | Succeeded by Paul S. Diamond |
