= Jay Waldman =

American judge (1944–2003)

Jay Carl Waldman
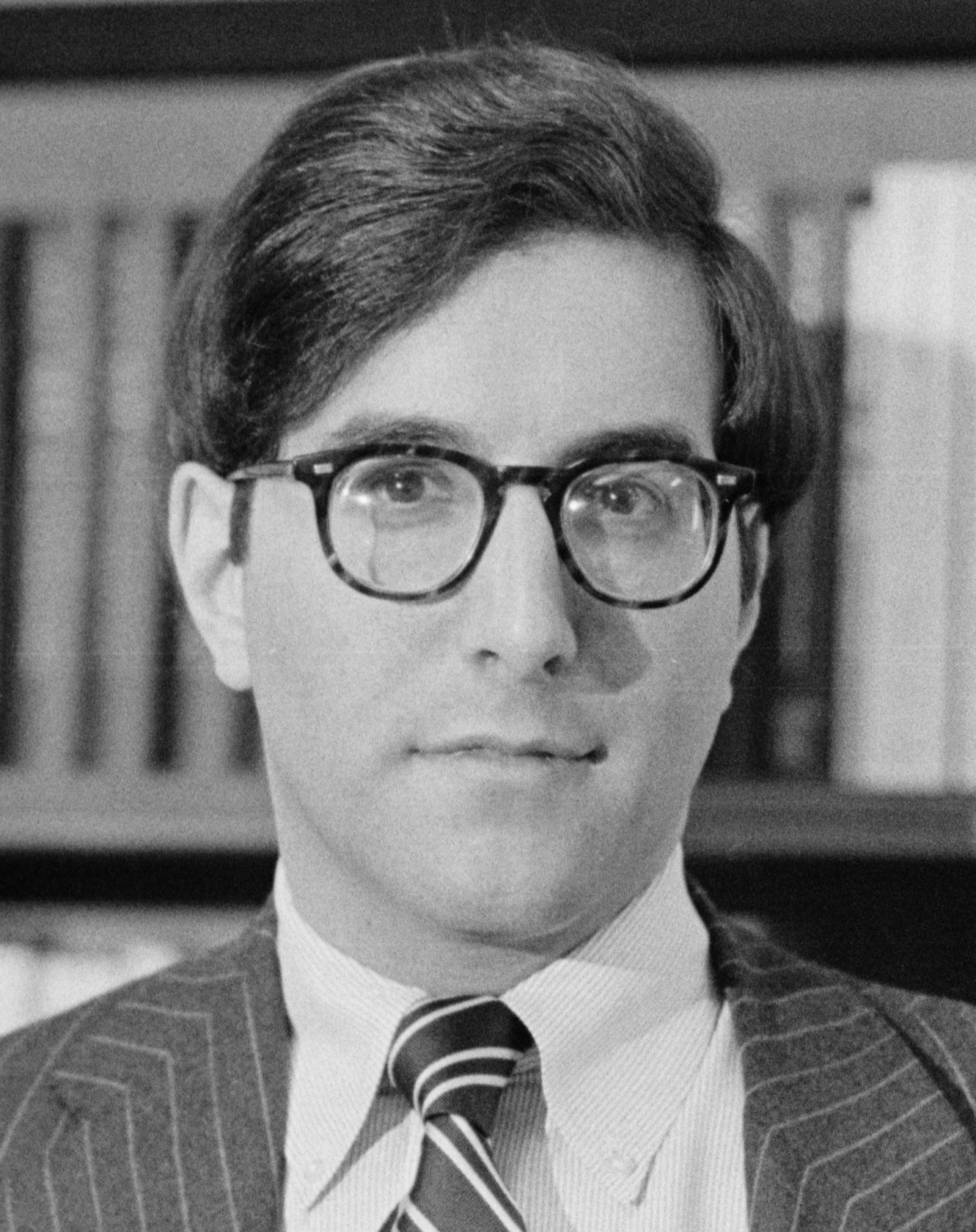
- Waldman in 1976

Judge of the United States District Court for the Eastern District of Pennsylvania
- In office October 17, 1988 – May 30, 2003
- Appointed by: Ronald Reagan
- Preceded by: Daniel Henry Huyett III
- Succeeded by: Juan Ramon Sánchez

Personal details
- Born: Jay Carl Waldman; November 16, 1944 Pittsburgh, Pennsylvania, U.S.
- Died: May 30, 2003 (aged 58) Philadelphia, Pennsylvania, U.S.
- Education: University of Wisconsin–Madison (B.S.); University of Pennsylvania Law School (LL.B.)

Jay Carl Waldman (November 16, 1944 – May 30, 2003) was a United States district judge of the United States District Court for the Eastern District of Pennsylvania and a former federal judicial nominee to the United States Court of Appeals for the Third Circuit.

== Education and career ==
Born in Pittsburgh, Pennsylvania, Waldman received a Bachelor of Science degree in history from the University of Wisconsin–Madison in 1966. He received a Bachelor of Laws from the University of Pennsylvania Law School in 1969. He was a law clerk for Judge Gwilym A. Price Jr. of the Court of Common Pleas in Pittsburgh from 1969 to 1970. He was in the private practice of law in Pittsburgh from 1970 to 1971. He was an Assistant United States Attorney for the Western District of Pennsylvania from 1971 to 1975. He was the Deputy Assistant United States Attorney General of the United States Department of Justice Criminal Division in Washington, D.C., from 1975 to 1977. He was the Director of the Thornburgh for Governor Commission in Philadelphia in 1978. He was a counsel to Governor Dick Thornburgh in Harrisburg from 1979 to 1981. He was the general counsel of the Commonwealth of Pennsylvania in Harrisburg from 1981 to 1986. He was the Commissioner of the Pennsylvania Convention Center Authority from 1986 to 1988. He was in private practice of law in Philadelphia from 1986 to 1988.

== Federal judicial service ==
Waldman was nominated by President Ronald Reagan on August 3, 1988, to a seat on the United States District Court for the Eastern District of Pennsylvania vacated by Judge Daniel Henry Huyett III. Despite the nomination occurring after the Thurmond Rule, he was confirmed by the United States Senate on October 14, 1988, and received his commission on October 17, 1988. His service was terminated on May 30, 2003, due to death.

== First nomination to the Third Circuit ==
On July 26, 1991, President George H. W. Bush nominated Waldman to a seat on the United States Court of Appeals for the Third Circuit. However, with the Senate Judiciary Committee controlled by Democrats, Waldman's nomination languished, and the committee never acted on the nomination before the end of Bush's presidency. President Bill Clinton chose not to renominate Waldman to the Third Circuit.

== Second nomination to the Third Circuit ==
Just before his death in 2003, Waldman was expected to be renominated to the Third Circuit by President George W. Bush to replace Judge Edward R. Becker. Waldman died about a month after being nominated, which was well before the Senate Judiciary Committee had even begun to take up the nomination. Bush eventually wound up nominating Franklin Van Antwerpen for the seat.

== Death ==
Waldman went on an extended medical leave in January 2003 as he battled lung cancer. Waldman died on May 30, 2003, at Thomas Jefferson University Hospital in Philadelphia.

== See also ==
- George H. W. Bush judicial appointment controversies

== Sources ==
Legal offices
Preceded by Daniel Henry Huyett III	Judge of the United States District Court for the Eastern District of Pennsylvania; 1988–2003	Succeeded by Juan Ramon Sánchez
