= Michael Baylson =

American judge (born 1939)

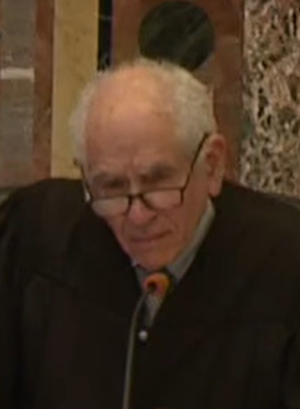
- Baylson in April 2017

Senior Judge of the United States District Court for the Eastern District of Pennsylvania
- Incumbent
- Assumed office July 13, 2012

Judge of the United States District Court for the Eastern District of Pennsylvania
- In office June 19, 2002 – July 13, 2012
- Appointed by: George W. Bush
- Preceded by: Robert F. Kelly
- Succeeded by: Wendy Beetlestone

Personal details
- Born: May 29, 1939 (age 86) Philadelphia, Pennsylvania, U.S.
- Education: University of Pennsylvania (BS, LLB)

Michael Morris Baylson (born May 29, 1939) is a senior United States district judge of the U.S. District Court for the Eastern District of Pennsylvania.

== Early life and education ==
Baylson was born in Philadelphia, on May 29, 1939. He attended Cheltenham High School in neighboring Cheltenham Township, Pennsylvania, where he graduated in 1957. He received a Bachelor of Science degree from the University of Pennsylvania in 1961 and received his Bachelor of Laws from the University of Pennsylvania Law School in 1964.

== Career ==
Baylson was a law clerk for Joseph Sloane in the Philadelphia Court of Common Pleas in 1965. He was an assistant district attorney in Philadelphia from 1966 to 1970. From 1970 to 1988 Judge Baylson was in private practice in Philadelphia. In 1988 he was appointed by President Ronald Reagan as the United States attorney for the Eastern District, a position he held until 1993. He returned to private practice as a partner with Duane Morris until 2002.

=== Federal judicial service ===
On January 23, 2002, Baylson was nominated by President George W. Bush to a seat on the United States District Court for the Eastern District that had been vacated by Judge Robert F. Kelly. He was confirmed by the United States Senate on April 30, 2002, and received his commission on June 19, 2002. He assumed senior status on July 13, 2012.

== Other activities ==
Baylson was a founder, and later counsel, to Gaudenzia, Inc., the largest non-profit provider of drug, alcohol and mental health rehabilitation services in Pennsylvania.

Baylson is a member of the Advisory Committee on Civil Rules of the Committee on Rules of Practice and Procedure of the Judicial Conference of the United States, and is also adjunct professor at the University of Pennsylvania Law School and Temple University Beasley School of Law.

Legal offices
Preceded by Robert F. Kelly	Judge of the United States District Court for the Eastern District of Pennsylvania; 2002–2012	Succeeded by Wendy Beetlestone
