= Joel Harvey Slomsky =

American judge (born 1946)

Senior Judge of the United States District Court for the Eastern District of Pennsylvania
- Incumbent
- Assumed office October 9, 2018

Judge of the United States District Court for the Eastern District of Pennsylvania
- In office October 6, 2008 – October 9, 2018
- Appointed by: George W. Bush
- Preceded by: James T. Giles
- Succeeded by: John M. Gallagher

Personal details
- Born: Joel Harvey Slomsky; May 27, 1946 (age 79) Brooklyn, New York
- Education: Brooklyn College (BA); New York Law School (JD)

Joel Harvey Slomsky (born 1946) is a senior United States district judge of the United States District Court for the Eastern District of Pennsylvania.

== Education and career ==
Born in Brooklyn, New York, Slomsky received a Bachelor of Arts degree from Brooklyn College in 1967 and a Juris Doctor from New York Law School in 1970. He was a Special Attorney of the Criminal Division, Philadelphia Strike Force, United States Department of Justice from 1971 to 1973. He was in private practice in Pennsylvania from 1973 to 2008.

== Federal judicial service ==
On July 24, 2008, Slomsky was nominated by President George W. Bush to a seat on the United States District Court for the Eastern District of Pennsylvania vacated by James T. Giles. Slomsky was confirmed by the United States Senate on September 26, 2008, and received his commission on October 6, 2008. He assumed senior status on October 9, 2018.

== Sources ==
Legal offices
Preceded by James T. Giles	Judge of the United States District Court for the Eastern District of Pennsylvania; 2008–2018	Succeeded by John M. Gallagher
