= Juan Ramon Sánchez (judge) =

American judge (born 1955)

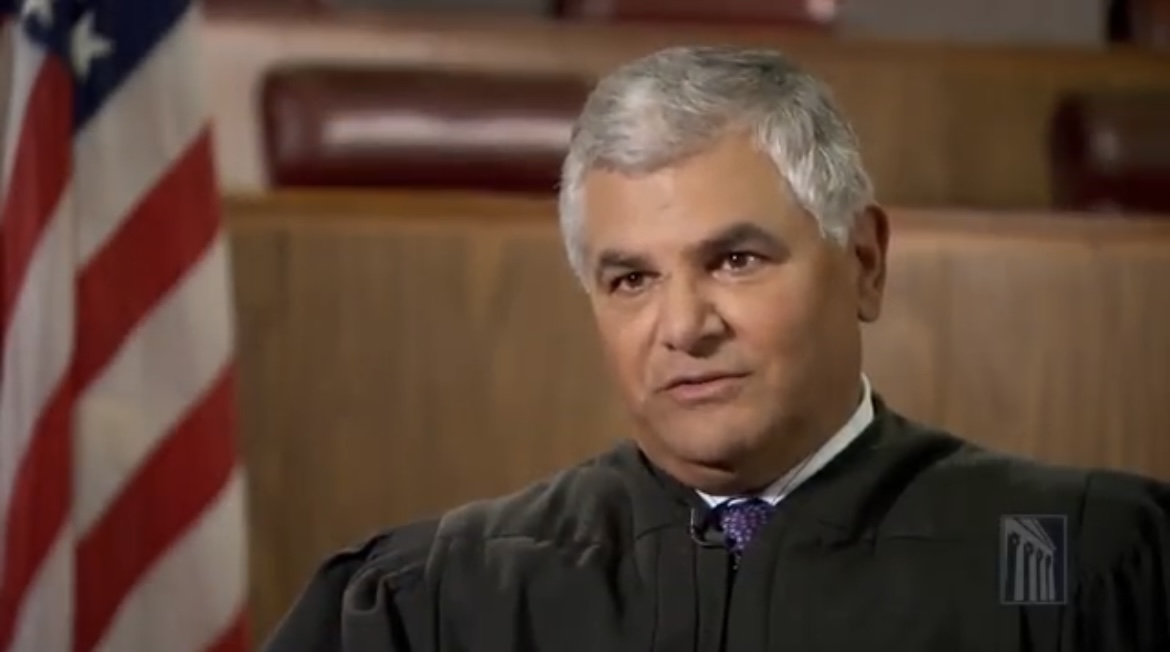

Chief Judge of the United States District Court for the Eastern District of Pennsylvania
- In office August 1, 2018 – March 4, 2024
- Preceded by: Lawrence F. Stengel
- Succeeded by: Mitchell S. Goldberg

Judge of the United States District Court for the Eastern District of Pennsylvania
- Incumbent
- Assumed office June 24, 2004
- Appointed by: George W. Bush
- Preceded by: Jay Waldman

Judge of the Court of Common Pleas for Chester County
- In office 1998 – June 2004

Personal details
- Born: Juan Ramon Sánchez; December 22, 1955 (age 70) Vega Baja, Puerto Rico, U.S.
- Education: City College of New York (BA); University of Pennsylvania (JD)

Juan Ramon Sánchez (born December 22, 1955) is a United States district judge of the United States District Court for the Eastern District of Pennsylvania. He served as the chief judge of the Eastern District of Pennsylvania from 2018 to 2024.

== Education and career ==
Born in Vega Baja, Puerto Rico, Sánchez received a Bachelor of Arts degree from City College of New York in 1978 and a Juris Doctor from the University of Pennsylvania Law School in 1981. He was a Staff attorney of Legal Aid of Chester County, Pennsylvania, from 1981 to 1983. He was in private practice in West Chester, Pennsylvania, from 1983 to 1984, and was then an attorney for the County of Chester Public Defender's Office from 1984 to 1997. He was a judge on the Chester County Court of Common Pleas from 1998 to 2004.

== Federal judicial service ==
On November 25, 2003, Sánchez was nominated by President George W. Bush to a seat on the United States District Court for the Eastern District of Pennsylvania vacated by Jay Waldman. Sánchez was confirmed by the United States Senate on June 23, 2004, and received his commission on June 24, 2004.

On August 1, 2018, Sánchez became the first Latino chief judge of the Eastern District of Pennsylvania, due to the announced retirement of Lawrence F. Stengel. Sánchez resigned from that position on March 4, 2024.

=== Notable cases ===
In February 2019, Sanchez found that the University of the Sciences had not breached its contractual promise of a fair process when it expelled a student accused of campus sexual assault without providing a live hearing or an opportunity to cross examine witnesses. His judgment was then reversed by the unanimous United States Court of Appeals for the Third Circuit in May 2020.

== See also ==
- List of Hispanic and Latino American jurists
- List of first minority male lawyers and judges in Pennsylvania

Legal offices
Preceded by Jay Waldman	Judge of the United States District Court for the Eastern District of Pennsylvania; 2004–present	Incumbent
Preceded by Lawrence F. Stengel	Chief Judge of the United States District Court for the Eastern District of Pennsylvania; 2018–2024	Succeeded by Mitchell S. Goldberg
