= John R. Padova =

American judge (born 1935)

Senior Judge of the United States District Court for the Eastern District of Pennsylvania
- Incumbent
- Assumed office February 11, 2008

Judge of the United States District Court for the Eastern District of Pennsylvania
- In office March 18, 1992 – February 11, 2008
- Appointed by: George H. W. Bush
- Preceded by: Seat established by 104 Stat. 5089
- Succeeded by: Mitchell S. Goldberg

Personal details
- Born: May 7, 1935 (age 90) Philadelphia, Pennsylvania, U.S.
- Education: Villanova University (AB); Temple University (JD)

John R. Padova (born May 7, 1935) is a senior United States district judge of the United States District Court for the Eastern District of Pennsylvania.

== Education and career ==
Padova was born in Philadelphia. He received an Artium Baccalaureus degree from Villanova University in 1956 and a Juris Doctor from Temple University School of Law in 1959. He was in private practice in Philadelphia from 1960 to 1992, also serving in the United States Army, United States Army National Guard of New Jersey from 1959 to 1964 and in the United States Army Reserve, JAG Corps from 1964 to 1968.

=== Federal judicial service ===
On November 5, 1991, Padova was nominated by President George H. W. Bush to a new seat on the United States District Court for the Eastern District of Pennsylvania created by 104 Stat. 5089. He was confirmed by the United States Senate on March 13, 1992, and received his commission on March 18, 1992. He assumed senior status on February 11, 2008.

== Sources ==
Legal offices
Preceded by Seat established by 104 Stat. 5089	Judge of the United States District Court for the Eastern District of Pennsylvania; 1992–2008	Succeeded by Mitchell S. Goldberg
