= Antonio Pozos =

American judge (born 1982)

Antonio Miguel Pozos
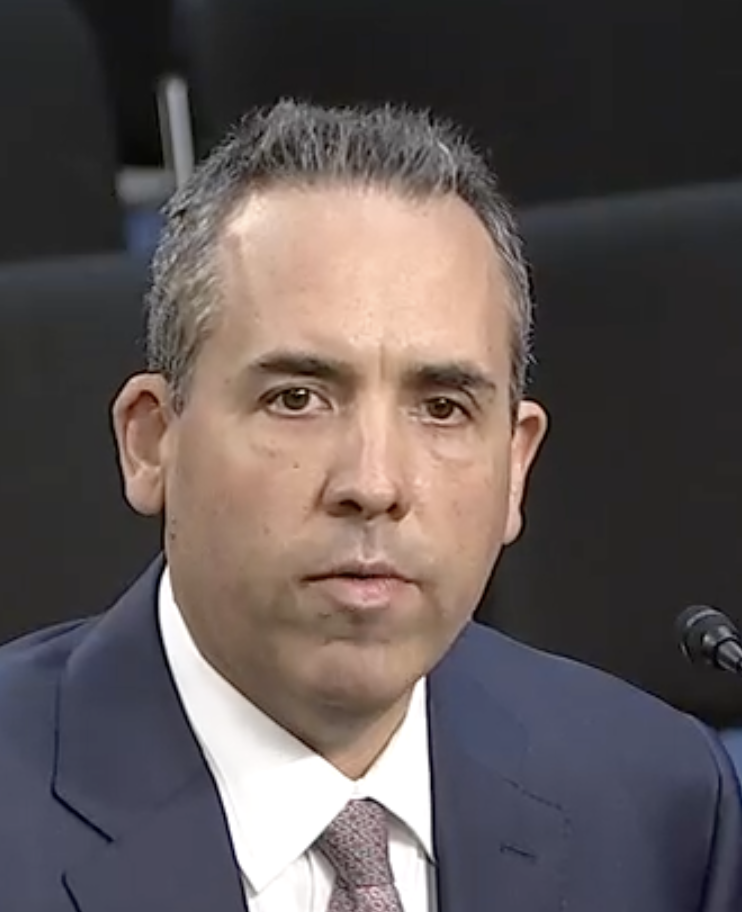

Judge of the United States District Court for the Eastern District of Pennsylvania
- Incumbent
- Assumed office August 10, 2026
- Appointed by: Donald Trump
- Preceded by: Mitchell S. Goldberg

Personal details
- Born: Antonio Miguel Pozos-Brewer; 1982 (age 43–44) Berkeley, California, U.S.
- Education: Harvard University (BA); University of Michigan (JD)

Antonio Miguel Pozos (born 1982) (known professionally as Antonio Pozos) is an American lawyer who has served as a United States district judge of the United States District Court for the Eastern District of Pennsylvania since 2026.

== Education ==
Pozos was born Antonio Miguel Pozos-Brewer in 1982 in Berkeley, California. He received an Artium Baccalaureus degree, magna cum laude, in 2004 from Harvard University and a Juris Doctor, cum laude, in 2007 from the University of Michigan Law School. From 2010 to 2011, he served as a law clerk for Judge Anthony Trenga of the United States District Court for the Eastern District of Virginia.

== Career ==
From 2011 to 2014, Pozos was an associate with the white shoe law firm of Cleary Gottlieb Steen & Hamilton LLP at its Washington, D.C. office. From 2014 to 2017, he served in the United States Department of Justice in the fraud section of the Criminal Division as a trial attorney. From 2018 to 2026, Pozos was a partner at the law firm of Faegre Drinker Biddle & Reath LLP in Philadelphia. From 2020 to 2021 and 2023 to 2025, he was a lecturer in law at the University of Pennsylvania Law School.

=== Federal judicial service ===
On May 11, 2026, President Donald Trump announced his intention to nominate Pozos to an undesignated seat on the United States District Court for the Eastern District of Pennsylvania. On May 12, 2026, Trump nominated Pozos to the seat on the Eastern District of Pennsylvania vacated by Judge Mitchell S. Goldberg. Pozos became the first nominee during Trump's second-term to have a Democratic senator return a blue slip for the pick after Senator John Fetterman (D-PA) broke ranks from other Democratic senators.

On July 16, 2026, his nomination was reported to the Senate by a 12–9 vote. On July 22, 2026, the Senate invoked cloture on his nomination by a 54–44 vote. On July 23, 2026, his nomination was confirmed by a vote of 49–44. He received his judicial commission on August 10, 2026.

== Personal ==
Pozos married Clare Tower Putnam on October 25, 2008. They currently reside in Bryn Mawr, Pennsylvania.

Legal offices
Preceded by Mitchell S. Goldberg	Judge of the United States District Court for the Eastern District of Pennsylvania; 2026–present	Incumbent
