= Emanuel Mac Troutman =

American judge

Senior Judge of the United States District Court for the Eastern District of Pennsylvania
- In office September 1, 1982 – October 8, 2004

Judge of the United States District Court for the Eastern District of Pennsylvania
- In office June 16, 1967 – September 1, 1982
- Appointed by: Lyndon B. Johnson
- Preceded by: Seat established by 80 Stat. 75
- Succeeded by: James McGirr Kelly

Personal details
- Born: Emanuel Mac Troutman; January 7, 1915 Greenwood Township, Pennsylvania, U.S.
- Died: October 8, 2004 (aged 89) Orwigsburg, Pennsylvania, U.S.
- Education: Dickinson College (A.B.); Dickinson School of Law (LL.B.)

Emanuel Mac Troutman (January 7, 1915 – October 8, 2004) was a United States district judge of the United States District Court for the Eastern District of Pennsylvania.

== Education and career ==
Born in Greenwood Township, (Note: There are five Greenwood Townships in Pennsylvania. FJC Bio does not indicate which specific Greenwood Township is meant.) Pennsylvania, Troutman received an Artium Baccalaureus degree from Dickinson College in 1934 and a Bachelor of Laws from Dickinson School of Law (now Pennsylvania State University - Dickinson Law) in 1936. He began working for the Philadelphia and Reading Coal and Iron Company in 1937, as an assistant to the general counsel, becoming its general counsel in 1958, and remaining in that position until 1962. He also served in the United States Army's Adjutant General's Office, and had a private practice in Pottsville, Pennsylvania from 1946 to 1967.

== Federal judicial service ==
On May 24, 1967, Troutman was nominated by President Lyndon B. Johnson to a new seat on the United States District Court for the Eastern District of Pennsylvania created by 80 Stat. 75. He was confirmed by the United States Senate on June 12, 1967, and received his commission on June 16, 1967. He assumed senior status on September 1, 1982, serving in that capacity until his death on October 8, 2004, in Orwigsburg, Pennsylvania.

== Sources ==
Legal offices
| Preceded by Seat established by 80 Stat. 75 | Judge of the United States District Court for the Eastern District of Pennsylvania; 1967–1982 | Succeeded by James McGirr Kelly |
