= Joseph F. Leeson Jr. =

American judge (born 1955)

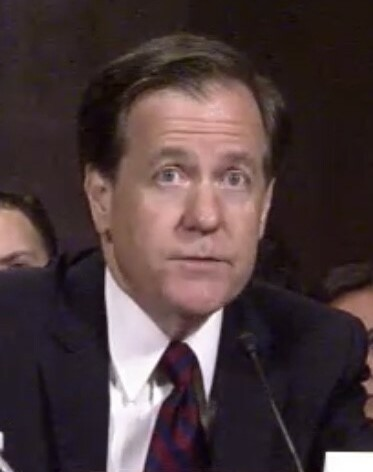
- Leeson in 2014

Judge of the United States District Court for the Eastern District of Pennsylvania
- Incumbent
- Assumed office December 5, 2014
- Appointed by: Barack Obama
- Preceded by: Eduardo C. Robreno

Personal details
- Born: 1955 (age 70–71) Allentown, Pennsylvania, U.S.
- Party: Democratic
- Education: DeSales University (BA); Catholic University of America (JD)

Joseph Francis Leeson Jr. (born 1955) is a United States district judge of the United States District Court for the Eastern District of Pennsylvania.

== Early life and education ==
Leeson was born in 1955, in Allentown, Pennsylvania and received a Bachelor of Arts degree, cum laude, in 1977 from DeSales University in Center Valley, Pennsylvania. He received a Juris Doctor in 1980 from the Catholic University of America Columbus School of Law.

== Career ==
Upon graduation from law school, he became a founding partner of the law firm of Leeson, Leeson & Leeson in Bethlehem, Pennsylvania. The firm conducted a general civil practice with an emphasis on litigation. In 2014, a fire heavily damaged the historic 19th century building that was owned and occupied by the firm. The building was subsequently reconstructed.

Leeson earned certification as a civil trial advocate from the National Board of Trial Advocacy and also served as an arbitrator for the American Arbitration Association. He served as a solicitor for several municipalities in Pennsylvania. In 2017, he was awarded an honorary Doctor of Law degree from DeSales University.

Leeson previously held elected public office as a member of the city council in Bethlehem, where he served as vice president and chair of the finance committee. He also was elected as a member of the Northampton County Government Study Commission where he co-authored the Home Rule Charter for Northampton County.

He has served as chair of the boards of the Lehigh Valley Public Telecommunications Corporation (WLVT-TV, WLVR-FM, and LehighValleyNews.com), the Lehigh Valley Community Foundation, the Lehigh–Northampton Airport Authority, and the Janet Johnston Housenick and William D. Housenick Memorial Foundation. He formerly served as a member of the board of commissioners of the Pennsylvania Public Television Network, and as a member of the administrative board of directors of the Pennsylvania Catholic Conference. He currently serves as a member of the Board of Trustees of DeSales University.

=== Federal judicial service ===
On June 16, 2014, President Barack Obama nominated Leeson to serve as a United States District Judge of the United States District Court for the Eastern District of Pennsylvania to the seat vacated by Judge Eduardo C. Robreno, who assumed senior status on August 31, 2013. On July 24, 2014, a hearing before the United States Senate Committee on the Judiciary was held on his nomination. On September 18, 2014, his nomination was reported out of committee by a voice vote. On December 3, 2014, Senate Majority Leader Harry Reid filed a cloture motion on his nomination. On December 4, 2014, the United States Senate invoked cloture on Leeson’s nomination by a 66–26 vote. Later that day, Leeson was confirmed by a 76–16 vote. He received his judicial commission on December 5, 2014.

Legal offices
Preceded by Eduardo C. Robreno	Judge of the United States District Court for the Eastern District of Pennsylvania; 2014–present	Incumbent
