= James McGirr Kelly =

American judge

Senior Judge of the United States District Court for the Eastern District of Pennsylvania
- In office March 31, 1996 – March 5, 2005

Judge of the United States District Court for the Eastern District of Pennsylvania
- In office August 6, 1983 – March 31, 1996
- Appointed by: Ronald Reagan
- Preceded by: Emanuel Mac Troutman
- Succeeded by: Bruce William Kauffman

Personal details
- Born: James McGirr Kelly; March 24, 1928 Philadelphia, Pennsylvania, U.S.
- Died: March 5, 2005 (aged 76) Overbrook, Pennsylvania, U.S.
- Education: University of Pennsylvania (B.S.); Temple University School of Law (J.D.)

James McGirr Kelly (March 24, 1928 – March 5, 2005) was a United States district judge of the United States District Court for the Eastern District of Pennsylvania.

== Education and career ==
Born in Philadelphia, Pennsylvania, Kelly received a Bachelor of Science degree from the University of Pennsylvania, Wharton School of Business in 1951 and was in the United States Navy from 1951 to 1953, serving as a gunnery officer. He received a Juris Doctor from Temple University School of Law in 1957, and served as a law clerk for Judge Edward J. Griffiths of the Court of Common Pleas in Philadelphia from 1957 to 1958. He was an assistant district attorney in Philadelphia from 1958 to 1960. He was an Assistant United States Attorney of the Eastern District of Pennsylvania from 1960 to 1962. He was in private practice in Philadelphia from 1962 to 1983. He was a Master of the Jury Selection Board for the Philadelphia Court of Common Pleas from 1963 to 1964. He was a special assistant commonwealth attorney general of Pennsylvania from 1964 to 1965. He was an adjunct professor of business law at Drexel University from 1965 to 1989. He was a member of the Pennsylvania Public Utility Commission from 1967 to 1977. He was a Vice President of regulatory practices at American Water Works Company from 1977 to 1983.

== Federal judicial service ==
Kelly was nominated by President Ronald Reagan on June 21, 1983, to a seat on the United States District Court for the Eastern District of Pennsylvania vacated by Judge Emanuel Mac Troutman. He was confirmed by the United States Senate on August 4, 1983, and received his commission on August 6, 1983. He assumed senior status on March 31, 1996. Kelly served in that capacity until his death, in Overbrook, a neighborhood in northwest Philadelphia.

== Sources ==
Legal offices
Preceded by Emanuel Mac Troutman	Judge of the United States District Court for the Eastern District of Pennsylvania; 1983–1996	Succeeded by Bruce William Kauffman
