= Gail A. Weilheimer =

American judge (born 1970)

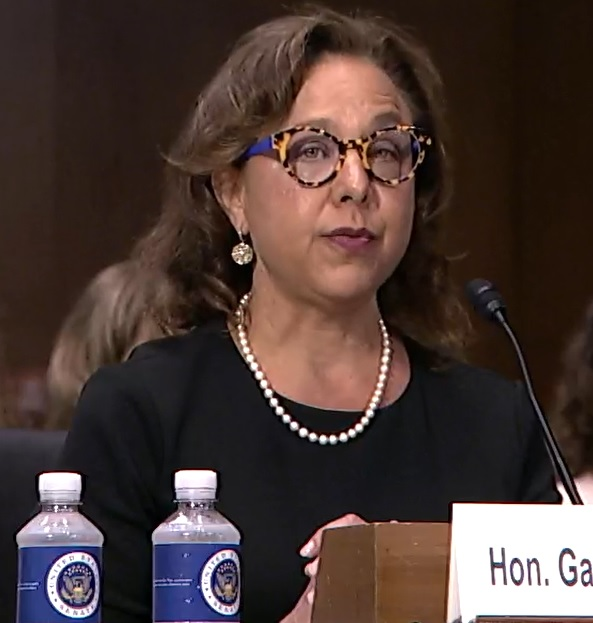

Judge of the United States District Court for the Eastern District of Pennsylvania
- Incumbent
- Assumed office January 2, 2025
- Appointed by: Joe Biden
- Preceded by: Gene E. K. Pratter

Judge of the Montgomery County Court of Common Pleas
- In office 2014 – January 3, 2025

Personal details
- Born: Gail Allison Zuckerman; 1970 (age 55–56) Syracuse, New York, U.S.
- Party: Democratic
- Education: Hofstra University (BA, JD)

Gail Allison Weilheimer (née Zuckerman; born 1970) is an American lawyer who has served as a United States district judge of the United States District Court for the Eastern District of Pennsylvania since 2025. She previously served as a judge of the Montgomery County Court of Common Pleas from 2014 to 2025.

== Education ==
Weilheimer received a Bachelor of Arts in 1992 from Hofstra University and a Juris Doctor in 1995, from the Maurice A. Deane School of Law of Hofstra University.

== Career ==
From 1995 to 2002, Weilheimer served as an assistant district attorney in the Philadelphia District Attorney's Office. In 2002, she worked as an associate at Abrahams, Loewenstein and Bushman, P.C. in Philadelphia. From 2003 to 2006, she was a litigation associate, where she focused on criminal defense practice at Frank, Rosen, Snyder and Moss in Elkins Park, Pennsylvania. From 2006 to 2013, she worked as a senior counsel at Wisler Pearlstine, LLP in Blue Bell, Pennsylvania, She was an Abington Township commissioner from 2004 to 2008.

In November 2013, Weilheimer was elected as a judge of the Montgomery County Court of Common Pleas, running as a Democrat and receiving 63,084 votes, defeating her Republican opponent Sharon Giamporcaro, who received 58,906 votes. She served in that position from 2014 to 2025.

=== Federal judicial service ===
On July 3, 2024, President Joe Biden announced his intent to nominate Weilheimer to serve as a United States district judge of the United States District Court for the Eastern District of Pennsylvania. On July 8, 2024, her nomination was sent to the Senate. President Biden nominated Weilheimer to the seat vacated by Judge Gene E. K. Pratter, who died on May 17, 2024. On July 31, 2024, a hearing on her nomination was held before the Senate Judiciary Committee. During her confirmation hearing, Senator John Neely Kennedy questioned her about a case of a nursing home assistant who sexually assaulted an elderly, incapacitated woman with Alzheimer's disease, whom Weilheimer sentenced to eleven months for the crime following a plea deal. On September 19, 2024, her nomination was reported out of committee by an 11–10 party-line vote. On November 21, 2024, the United States Senate invoked cloture on her nomination by a 51–47 vote. On December 3, 2024, her nomination was confirmed by a 50–48 vote. She received her judicial commission on January 2, 2025, and was sworn in on January 3, 2025.

== Electoral history ==
2013 Montgomery County Court of Common Pleas election (vote for 2)
Party	Candidate	Votes	%
Democratic	Gail Weilheimer	63,028	25.92%
Democratic	Steven C. Tolliver	61,639	25.35%
Republican	Maureen Coggins	59,911	24.64%
Republican	Sharon Giamporcaro	58,596	24.10%
Total votes		243,474	100.0%

2023 Judge Gail A. Weilheimer (D) retention
Choice	Votes	%
For	167,458	78.66
Against	45,435	21.34
Total	212,893	100.00

Legal offices
Preceded by Gene E. K. Pratter	Judge of the United States District Court for the Eastern District of Pennsylvania; 2025–present	Incumbent
