= Catherine Henry =

American judge (born 1969)

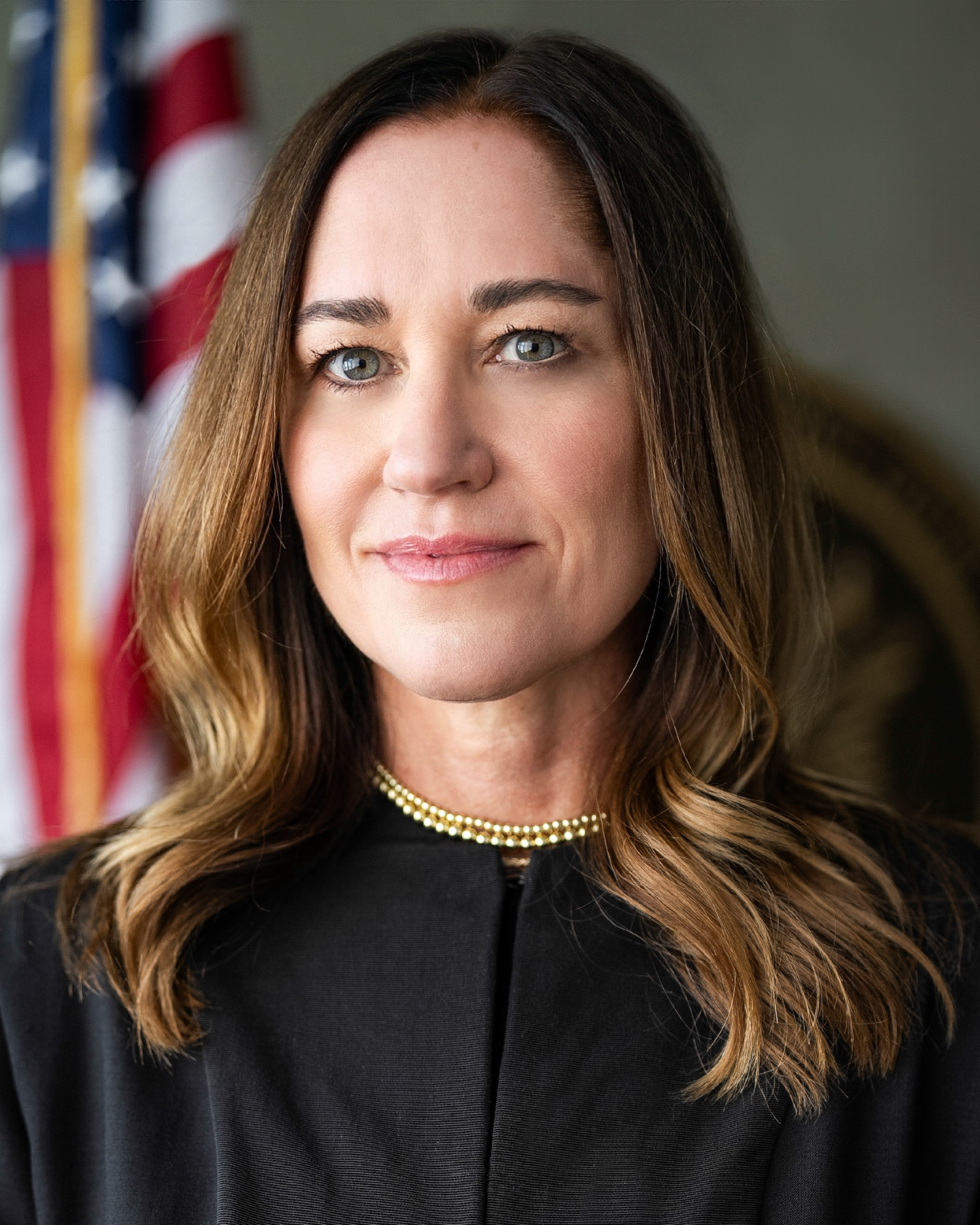

Judge of the United States District Court for the Eastern District of Pennsylvania
- Incumbent
- Assumed office December 6, 2024
- Appointed by: Joe Biden
- Preceded by: Edward G. Smith

Personal details
- Born: 1969 (age 56–57) Edison, New Jersey, U.S.
- Education: Drew University (BA); University of the District of Columbia (JD)

Catherine Henry (born 1969) is an American lawyer who is serving as a United States district judge of the United States District Court for the Eastern District of Pennsylvania.

== Education ==
Henry received a Bachelor of Arts from Drew University in 1991 and a Juris Doctor from the District of Columbia School of Law in 1995.

== Career ==
From 1995 to 1996, Henry was a staff attorney at the Feminist Majority Foundation in Arlington, Virginia. From 1996 to 2001, she worked as a public defender at the Defender Association of Philadelphia. From 2001 to 2024, she served as an assistant federal defender in the Federal Community Defender's Office for the Eastern District of Pennsylvania. She has taught at the University of Pennsylvania Law School and Temple University School of Law.

=== Federal judicial service ===
On May 23, 2024, President Joe Biden announced his intent to nominate Henry to serve as a United States district judge of the United States District Court for the Eastern District of Pennsylvania. She was recommended to the Biden administration by Senator John Fetterman. On June 4, 2024, her nomination was sent to the Senate. President Biden nominated Henry to the seat vacated by Judge Edward G. Smith, who died on November 27, 2023. On June 20, 2024, a hearing on her nomination was held before the Senate Judiciary Committee. On August 1, 2024, her nomination was reported out of committee by an 11–9 vote. On November 21, 2024, the United States Senate invoked cloture on her nomination by a 50–49 vote. On December 3, 2024, her nomination was confirmed by a 50–48 vote. She received her judicial commission on December 6, 2024, and was sworn in on December 12, 2024.

Legal offices
| Preceded by Edward G. Smith | Judge of the United States District Court for the Eastern District of Pennsylvania; 2024–present | Incumbent |
