= Charles Louis McKeehan =

American judge (1876–1925)

Judge of the United States District Court for the Eastern District of Pennsylvania
- In office February 9, 1923 – March 23, 1925
- Appointed by: Warren G. Harding
- Preceded by: Seat established by 42 Stat. 837
- Succeeded by: Seat abolished

Personal details
- Born: Charles Louis McKeehan; March 29, 1876 Philadelphia, Pennsylvania
- Died: March 23, 1925 (aged 48)
- Education: University of Pennsylvania (A.B.); University of Pennsylvania Law School (LL.B.)

Charles Louis McKeehan (March 29, 1876 – March 23, 1925) was a United States district judge of the United States District Court for the Eastern District of Pennsylvania.

== Education and career ==
Born in Philadelphia, Pennsylvania, McKeehan received an Artium Baccalaureus degree from the University of Pennsylvania in 1897 and a Bachelor of Laws from the University of Pennsylvania Law School in 1900. He was in private practice in Philadelphia from 1900 to 1923. On March 1, 1912, he, along with William W. Montgomery and future United States Supreme Court Justice Owen J. Roberts, founded Roberts, Montgomery & McKeehan, the predecessor of the law firm Montgomery, McCracken, Walker & Rhoads, LLP. He served as a lieutenant colonel in the United States Army during World War I from 1917 to 1919.

== Federal judicial service ==
On January 30, 1923, McKeehan was nominated by President Warren G. Harding to a new seat on the United States District Court for the Eastern District of Pennsylvania created by 42 Stat. 837. He was confirmed by the United States Senate on February 9, 1923, and received his commission the same day. McKeehan served in that capacity until his death on March 23, 1925.

== Sources ==
Legal offices
Preceded by Seat established by 42 Stat. 837	Judge of the United States District Court for the Eastern District of Pennsylvania; 1923–1925	Succeeded by Seat abolished
