= Gene E. K. Pratter =

American federal judge (1949–2024)

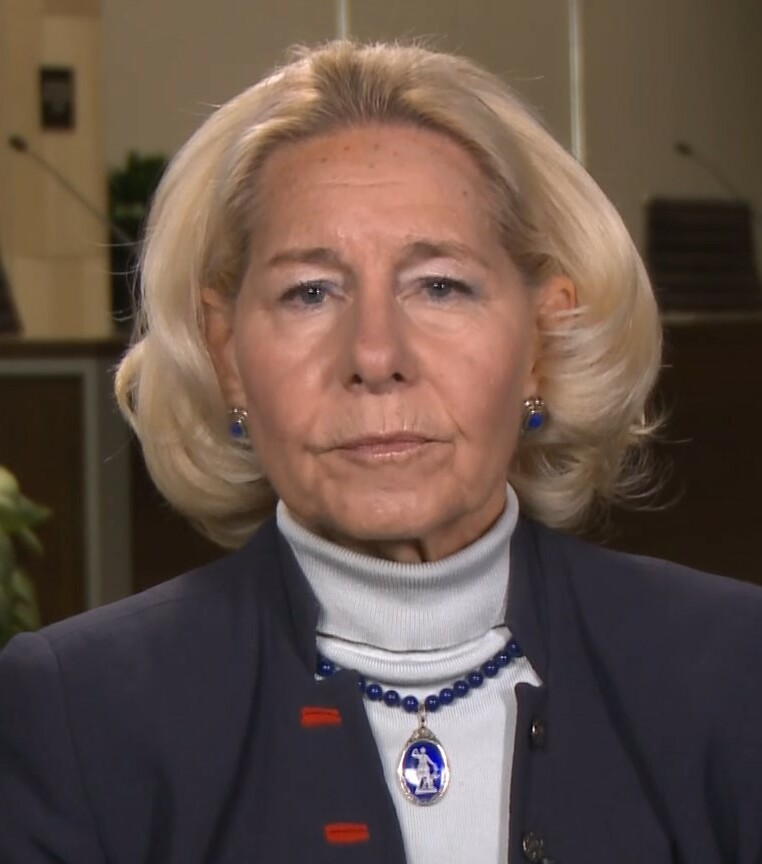
- Pratter in 2015

Judge of the United States District Court for the Eastern District of Pennsylvania
- In office June 16, 2004 – May 17, 2024
- Appointed by: George W. Bush
- Preceded by: William H. Yohn Jr.
- Succeeded by: Gail A. Weilheimer

Personal details
- Born: February 25, 1949 Chicago, Illinois, U.S.
- Died: May 17, 2024 (aged 75)
- Education: Stanford University (AB); University of Pennsylvania (JD)

Gene Ellen Kreyche Pratter (February 25, 1949 – May 17, 2024) was an American lawyer and jurist who was a United States district judge of the U.S. District Court for the Eastern District of Pennsylvania from 2004 to 2024. She was former nominee to the United States Court of Appeals for the Third Circuit.

== Education and career ==
Born in Chicago, Illinois, Pratter received her Artium Baccalaureus degree from Stanford University in 1971, and her Juris Doctor from University of Pennsylvania Law School in 1975. Her entire career in private practice was spent at the Philadelphia, Pennsylvania, law firm of Duane Morris, including as general counsel from 1999 to 2004.

== District court service ==
Pratter was nominated by President George W. Bush on November 3, 2003, to a seat on the United States District Court for the Eastern District of Pennsylvania vacated by William H. Yohn Jr. She was confirmed by the Senate on June 15, 2004, and received her commission on June 16, 2004.

She was highly respected as a judge among her colleagues.

== Third Circuit nomination under Bush ==
On November 15, 2007, she was nominated by President George W. Bush to a seat on the United States Court of Appeals for the Third Circuit vacated by Judge Franklin Stuart Van Antwerpen, who assumed senior status in 2006. In February 2008, the liberal group Leadership Conference on Civil Rights sent a letter to the Senate Judiciary Committee, then chaired by Senator Patrick Leahy, D-VT. The group claimed that Pratter had as a district court judge, "exhibited a willingness to prematurely dismiss the claims of civil rights plaintiffs and to inhibit advocacy by their counsel, thus denying these plaintiffs access to a full and fair legal process." As a result, Leahy refused to process her nomination for the rest of the 110th Congress. In an act of reconciliation with the Senate Democrats, Bush withdrew her nomination in July 2008 in favor of Paul S. Diamond.

== Community service ==
Judge Pratter was a trustee of the Baldwin School, a kindergarten-through-12th grade and all-girls school located in Bryn Mawr, Pennsylvania. Over decades, she interacted with students of all ages in explaining the legal system to them, including a longstanding tradition of bringing Baldwin's 5th grade class to the James A. Byrne United States Courthouse in Philadelphia to participate in naturalization ceremonies conducted by Judge Pratter. This was consistent with the importance she placed on citizen participation in understanding the legal system.

== Death ==
Pratter died on May 17, 2024, at the age of 75.

== See also ==
- George W. Bush judicial appointment controversies

== Sources ==
Legal offices
Preceded by William H. Yohn Jr.	Judge of the United States District Court for the Eastern District of Pennsylvania; 2004–2024	Succeeded by Gail A. Weilheimer
