= John M. Gallagher =

American judge (born 1966)

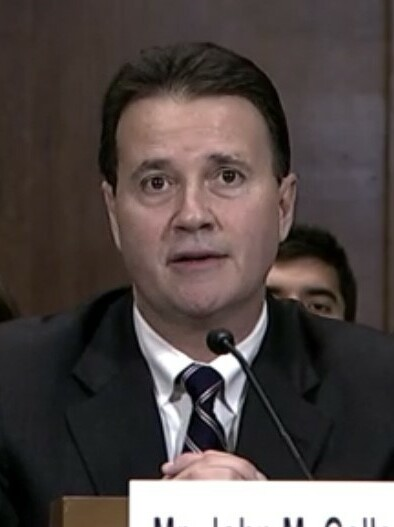

Judge of the United States District Court for the Eastern District of Pennsylvania
- Incumbent
- Assumed office December 31, 2019
- Appointed by: Donald Trump
- Preceded by: Joel Harvey Slomsky

Personal details
- Born: John Michael Gallagher; 1966 (age 59–60) Queens, New York, U.S.
- Education: Long Island University (BS); New York Law School (JD)

John Michael Gallagher (born 1966) is a United States district judge of the United States District Court for the Eastern District of Pennsylvania.

== Education ==
Gallagher earned his Bachelor of Science from Long Island University in 1989 and his Juris Doctor from New York Law School in 1994.

== Civil service ==
Gallagher held leadership positions in both the Miami and Philadelphia Police Departments and also served as a New York City Police Officer from 1989 to 1994.

== Legal career ==
Gallagher was also a White House Fellow in the U.S. Department of Justice from 2000 to 2001, serving as Counsel to U.S. Attorneys General Janet Reno and John Ashcroft. From 2004 to 2019, he served as an Assistant United States Attorney in the United States Attorney's Office for the Eastern District of Pennsylvania, where he was the Chief of the Allentown Branch from 2014 to 2019.

== Federal judicial service ==
On August 28, 2019, President Donald Trump announced his intent to nominate Gallagher to serve as a United States district judge for the United States District Court for the Eastern District of Pennsylvania. On October 15, 2019, his nomination was sent to the Senate. President Trump nominated Gallagher to the seat vacated by Judge Joel Harvey Slomsky, who assumed senior status on October 9, 2018. On October 16, 2019, a hearing on his nomination was held before the Senate Judiciary Committee. On November 7, 2019, his nomination was reported out of committee by a 19–3 vote. On December 18, 2019, the United States Senate invoked cloture on his nomination by an 82–10 vote. On December 19, 2019, his nomination was confirmed by an 83–9 vote. He received his judicial commission on December 31, 2019.

Legal offices
Preceded by Joel Harvey Slomsky	Judge of the United States District Court for the Eastern District of Pennsylvania; 2019–present	Incumbent
