= Berle M. Schiller =

American judge (1944–2025)

Senior Judge of the United States District Court for the Eastern District of Pennsylvania
- In office June 18, 2012 – July 22, 2025

Judge of the United States District Court for the Eastern District of Pennsylvania
- In office June 2, 2000 – June 18, 2012
- Appointed by: Bill Clinton
- Preceded by: Robert S. Gawthrop III
- Succeeded by: Edward G. Smith

Judge of the Superior Court of Pennsylvania
- In office June 7, 1996 – June 1, 2000

Personal details
- Born: June 17, 1944 New York City, U.S.
- Died: July 22, 2025 (aged 81)
- Education: Bowdoin College (BA); New York University (JD)

Berle Mark Schiller (June 17, 1944 – July 22, 2025) was a United States district judge of the United States District Court for the Eastern District of Pennsylvania from 2000 to 2025.

== Education and career ==
Schiller was born in Brooklyn, New York City on June 17, 1944. He received a Bachelor of Arts degree from Bowdoin College in 1965 and a Juris Doctor from New York University School of Law in 1968. He was in private practice of law in Pennsylvania from 1968 to 1969. He was a deputy attorney general of Pennsylvania Department of Justice in 1971, returning to private practice from 1972 to 1993. He was a chief counsel to the Federal Transit Administration from 1994 to 1996, and was an appellate judge on the Superior Court of Pennsylvania from 1996 to 2000.

=== Federal judicial service ===
On April 11, 2000, Schiller was nominated by President Bill Clinton to a seat on the United States District Court for the Eastern District of Pennsylvania vacated by Judge Robert S. Gawthrop III. Schiller was confirmed by the United States Senate on May 24, 2000, and received his commission on June 2, 2000. He assumed senior status on June 18, 2012 and remained a senior judge until his death on July 22, 2025, at the age of 81.

Schiller was well known for his passion for hunting using a bow and arrow and traveled around the world doing so. His office in his chambers was festooned with many trophies on the wall.

== See also ==
- List of Jewish American jurists
- List of Bowdoin College people
- List of NYU Law School people

== Sources ==
Legal offices
Preceded by Robert S. Gawthrop III	Judge of the United States District Court for the Eastern District of Pennsylvania; 2000–2012	Succeeded by Edward G. Smith
