= Robert S. Gawthrop III =

American judge

Robert Smith Gawthrop III

Judge of the United States District Court for the Eastern District of Pennsylvania
- In office December 9, 1987 – August 1, 1999
- Appointed by: Ronald Reagan
- Preceded by: John William Ditter Jr.
- Succeeded by: Berle M. Schiller

Personal details
- Born: Robert Smith Gawthrop III; December 2, 1942 West Chester, Pennsylvania, U.S.
- Died: August 1, 1999 (aged 56) Philadelphia, Pennsylvania, U.S.
- Education: Amherst College (BA); Dickinson School of Law (JD)

Robert Smith Gawthrop III (December 2, 1942 – August 1, 1999) was a United States district judge of the United States District Court for the Eastern District of Pennsylvania.

== Education and career ==
Born in West Chester, Pennsylvania, Gawthrop received a Bachelor of Arts degree from Amherst College in 1964 and was in the United States Army from 1965 to 1967, achieving the rank of Lieutenant and assigned to Field Artillery. He received a Juris Doctor from Dickinson School of Law in 1970, and was a law clerk to Judge Lee F. Swope of the Court of Common Pleas of Dauphin County, in Harrisburg, Pennsylvania, from 1969 to 1970. Gawthrop was in private practice at the law firm Gawthrop Greenwood, PC in West Chester from 1970 to 1978. He was an assistant district attorney of West Chester from 1971 to 1978, and then of Wayne County, Pennsylvania from 1976 to 1977. He was a Judge of the Court of Common Pleas, Chester County, Pennsylvania from 1978 to 1988, also serving as an adjunct professor at the Dickinson School of Law from 1981 to 1982.

== Federal judicial service ==
On September 30, 1987, Gawthrop was nominated by President Ronald Reagan to a seat on the United States District Court for the Eastern District of Pennsylvania vacated by Judge John William Ditter Jr. Gawthrop was confirmed by the United States Senate on December 8, 1987, and received his commission on December 9, 1987. Gawthrop served in that capacity until his death of cancer, in Philadelphia, at the age of 56.

== Sources ==
Legal offices
Preceded by John William Ditter Jr.	Judge of the United States District Court for the Eastern District of Pennsylvania; 1987–1999	Succeeded by Berle M. Schiller
