= Gerald A. McHugh Jr. =

American judge (born 1954)

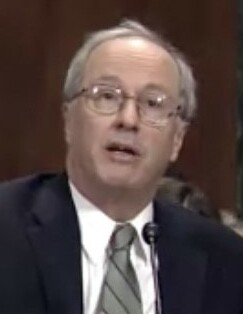
- McHugh in 2013

Judge of the United States District Court for the Eastern District of Pennsylvania
- Incumbent
- Assumed office March 28, 2014
- Appointed by: Barack Obama
- Preceded by: Harvey Bartle III

Personal details
- Born: Gerald Austin McHugh Jr. 1954 (age 71–72) Philadelphia, Pennsylvania, U.S.
- Party: Democratic
- Education: Saint Joseph's University (AB); University of Pennsylvania (JD)

Gerald Austin McHugh Jr. (born 1954) is a United States district judge of the United States District Court for the Eastern District of Pennsylvania.

== Biography ==
McHugh was born and raised in West Philadelphia. McHugh received an Artium Baccalaureus degree, summa cum laude, in 1976 from St. Joseph's University. He received a Juris Doctor, cum laude, in 1979 from the University of Pennsylvania Law School. In 1979, he served as a law clerk to Judge Edmund B. Spaeth of the Pennsylvania Superior Court. From 1979 to 1981, he served as a law clerk to Judge Alfred Leopold Luongo of the United States District Court for the Eastern District of Pennsylvania. From 1981 to 2004, he was a shareholder at the civil litigation law firm of Litvin, Blumberg, Matusow and Young. From 2004 to 2014, he was a partner at the Philadelphia law firm of Raynes McCarty, where he handled complex civil litigation involving tort, insurance, and civil rights claims.

=== Federal judicial service ===
On August 1, 2013, President Barack Obama nominated McHugh to serve as a United States district judge of the United States District Court for the Eastern District of Pennsylvania, to the seat vacated by Judge Harvey Bartle III, who assumed senior status on October 1, 2011. On January 16, 2014 his nomination was reported out of committee by a 12–5 vote. On Thursday March 13, 2014 Senate Majority Leader Harry Reid filed a motion to invoke cloture on the nomination. On March 26, 2014, the United States Senate invoked cloture on his nomination by a 56–43 vote. He was confirmed later that day by a 59–41 vote. He received his judicial commission on March 28, 2014.

Legal offices
Preceded by Harvey Bartle III	Judge of the United States District Court for the Eastern District of Pennsylvania; 2014–present	Incumbent
