= Bruce William Kauffman =

American judge (1934–2021)

Senior Judge of the United States District Court for the Eastern District of Pennsylvania
- In office February 11, 2008 – July 20, 2009

Judge of the United States District Court for the Eastern District of Pennsylvania
- In office November 12, 1997 – February 11, 2008
- Appointed by: Bill Clinton
- Preceded by: James McGirr Kelly
- Succeeded by: C. Darnell Jones II

Personal details
- Born: December 1, 1934 Atlantic City, New Jersey, U.S.
- Died: November 29, 2021 (aged 86)
- Education: University of Pennsylvania (BA); Yale University (LLB)

Bruce William Kauffman (December 1, 1934 – November 29, 2021) was a United States district judge of the United States District Court for the Eastern District of Pennsylvania.

== Education and career ==
Born in Atlantic City, New Jersey, Kauffman received a Bachelor of Arts degree from the University of Pennsylvania in 1956 and a Bachelor of Laws from Yale Law School in 1959. He was a law clerk to the Vincent S. Haneman, Superior Court of New Jersey from 1959 to 1960. He was in private practice in Philadelphia, Pennsylvania from 1960 to 1980, and was a justice on Pennsylvania Supreme Court from 1980 to 1982, thereafter returning to private practice until 1997. He was also a professor at the University of Pennsylvania School of Law from 1995 to 1997.

== Federal judicial service ==
On July 31, 1997, Kauffman was nominated by President Bill Clinton to a seat on the United States District Court for the Eastern District of Pennsylvania vacated by James McGirr Kelly. Kauffman was confirmed by the United States Senate on November 8, 1997, and received his commission on November 12, 1997. He assumed senior status on February 11, 2008, and retired completely on July 20, 2009. Upon retirement he became associated with the Elliott Greenleaf law firm in Philadelphia.

== Death ==
Kauffman died on November 29, 2021, at the age of 86.

== See also ==
- List of Jewish American jurists

== Sources ==
Legal offices
Preceded by James McGirr Kelly	Judge of the United States District Court for the Eastern District of Pennsylvania; 1997–2008	Succeeded by C. Darnell Jones II
