= Harvey Bartle III =

American judge (born 1941)

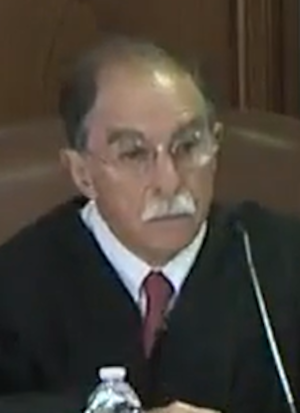

Senior Judge of the United States District Court for the Eastern District of Pennsylvania
- Incumbent
- Assumed office October 1, 2011

Chief Judge of the United States District Court for the Eastern District of Pennsylvania
- In office 2006–2011
- Preceded by: James T. Giles
- Succeeded by: J. Curtis Joyner

Judge of the United States District Court for the Eastern District of Pennsylvania
- In office September 16, 1991 – October 1, 2011
- Appointed by: George H. W. Bush
- Preceded by: Joseph Leo McGlynn Jr.
- Succeeded by: Gerald A. McHugh Jr.

39th Attorney General of Pennsylvania
- In office May 20, 1980 – January 18, 1981
- Governor: Richard Thornburgh
- Preceded by: Edward G. Biester Jr.
- Succeeded by: LeRoy Zimmerman

Personal details
- Born: Harvey Bartle III; June 6, 1941 (age 84) Bryn Mawr, Pennsylvania, U.S.
- Party: Republican
- Education: Princeton University (BA); University of Pennsylvania (LLB)

Harvey Bartle III (born June 6, 1941) is a senior United States district judge of the United States District Court for the Eastern District of Pennsylvania.

== Education and career ==
Bartle was born in Bryn Mawr, Pennsylvania. He received a Bachelor of Arts degree in 1962 from Princeton University. He received a Bachelor of Laws in 1965 from the University of Pennsylvania Law School. He served in the United States Army Reserve from 1966 to 1972, attaining the rank of Captain. He served as a law clerk for Judge John Morgan Davis of the United States District Court for the Eastern District of Pennsylvania, from 1965 to 1967. He was in private practice in Philadelphia, Pennsylvania from 1967 to 1979 and again from 1981 to 1991. He served as the Insurance Commissioner for the Commonwealth of Pennsylvania from 1979 to 1980. He served as the Attorney General for the Commonwealth of Pennsylvania from 1980 to 1981.

== Federal judicial service ==
Bartle was nominated by President George H. W. Bush on May 15, 1991, to a seat on the United States District Court for the Eastern District of Pennsylvania vacated by Judge Joseph Leo McGlynn, Jr. He was confirmed by the United States Senate on September 12, 1991, and received commission on September 16, 1991. He served as the chief judge from 2006 to 2011. He assumed senior status on October 1, 2011. He was a member of the Judicial Conference of the United States from 2008 to 2011.

== Sources ==
Legal offices
Preceded by Edward G. Biester Jr.	Attorney General of Pennsylvania; 1980–1981	Succeeded by LeRoy Zimmerman
Preceded by Joseph Leo McGlynn, Jr.	Judge of the United States District Court for the Eastern District of Pennsylvania; 1991–2011	Succeeded by Gerald A. McHugh Jr.
Preceded by James T. Giles	Chief Judge of the United States District Court for the Eastern District of Pennsylvania; 2006–2011	Succeeded by J. Curtis Joyner
