= Marvin Katz =

American judge

Senior Judge of the United States District Court for the Eastern District of Pennsylvania
- In office August 26, 1997 – October 12, 2010

Judge of the United States District Court for the Eastern District of Pennsylvania
- In office August 6, 1983 – August 26, 1997
- Appointed by: Ronald Reagan
- Preceded by: Joseph Simon Lord III
- Succeeded by: Mary A. McLaughlin

Personal details
- Born: November 22, 1930 Philadelphia, Pennsylvania, U.S.
- Died: October 12, 2010 (aged 79) Philadelphia, Pennsylvania, U.S.
- Education: University of Pennsylvania (BA); Yale University (LLB)

Marvin Katz (November 22, 1930 – October 12, 2010) was a United States district judge of the United States District Court for the Eastern District of Pennsylvania.

== Education and career ==
Born in Philadelphia, Pennsylvania, Katz received a Bachelor of Arts degree from the University of Pennsylvania in 1951 and a Bachelor of Laws from Yale Law School in 1954. He was in private practice in Philadelphia from 1954 to 1977, serving as a law clerk for Judge Francis X. McClanaghan of Pennsylvania's Court of Common Pleas from 1959 to 1960. Katz was an assistant to the Commissioner of the United States Internal Revenue Service from 1977 to 1981, thereafter returning to private practice in Philadelphia until 1983.

== Federal judicial service ==
On June 21, 1983, President Ronald Reagan nominated Katz to a seat on the United States District Court for the Eastern District of Pennsylvania vacated by Judge Joseph Simon Lord III. Katz was confirmed by the United States Senate on August 4, 1983, and received his commission on August 6, 1983. Katz assumed senior status on August 26, 1997, serving in that capacity until his death on October 12, 2010, in Philadelphia.

== Sources ==
Legal offices
Preceded by Joseph Simon Lord III	Judge of the United States District Court for the Eastern District of Pennsylvania; 1983–1997	Succeeded by Mary A. McLaughlin
