= LeRoy Zimmerman =

American lawyer

LeRoy S. Zimmerman

40th Attorney General of Pennsylvania First Elected
- In office January 20, 1981 – January 17, 1989
- Governor: Dick Thornburgh; Robert P. Casey
- Preceded by: Harvey Bartle III
- Succeeded by: Ernie Preate

Personal details
- Born: December 22, 1934 (age 91) Harrisburg, Pennsylvania
- Party: Republican
- Education: Villanova University; Dickinson School of Law
- Profession: Attorney

LeRoy S. Zimmerman (born December 22, 1934) is a former Pennsylvania Attorney General.

In 2002, he was named to the PoliticsPA list of politically influential individuals. He was named again in 2003 and deemed a "power broker in Central Pennsylvania." In 2010, Politics Magazine named him one of the most influential Republicans in the state.

== Later career ==
After his term as Pennsylvania Attorney General, Zimmerman became the chairman of the Hershey Trust Company. He resigned at the end of 2011. In 2013, Kathleen Kane, the Pennsylvania Attorney General, announced the conclusion of a two-year investigation into the operations of the Hershey Trust Company, in which the Office of Attorney General and the Hershey Trust Company agreed that there was a finding of no wrongdoing, but reforms were required of the trust company.

Legal offices
Preceded by Harvey Bartle III	Attorney General of Pennsylvania; 1981–1989	Succeeded by Ernie Preate
Party political offices
Preceded by None; Position made elected	Republican nominee for Attorney General of Pennsylvania; 1980, 1984	Succeeded by Ernie Preate
