= James Buchanan Holland =

American judge (1857–1914)

Judge of the United States District Court for the Eastern District of Pennsylvania
- In office April 19, 1904 – April 24, 1914
- Appointed by: Theodore Roosevelt
- Preceded by: Seat established by 33 Stat. 155
- Succeeded by: Seat abolished

Personal details
- Born: James Buchanan Holland; November 14, 1857 Gwynedd Township, Pennsylvania
- Died: April 24, 1914 (aged 56) Conshohocken, Pennsylvania
- Education: read law

James Buchanan Holland (November 14, 1857 – April 24, 1914) was a United States district judge of the United States District Court for the Eastern District of Pennsylvania.

== Education and career ==
Born in Gwynedd Township (now Lower Gwynedd Township and Upper Gwynedd Township), Montgomery County, Pennsylvania, Holland read law to enter the bar in 1887. He was clerk of county commissioners for Montgomery County from 1882 to 1887, and was then in private practice in Montgomery County from 1887 to 1904, also serving as a solicitor in Montgomery County from 1887 to 1893 and District Attorney of Montgomery County from 1893 to 1896. He was in the United States Navy from 1898 to 1900. He was the United States Attorney for the Eastern District of Pennsylvania from 1900 to 1904.

== Federal judicial service ==
On April 14, 1904, Holland was nominated by President Theodore Roosevelt to a new seat on the United States District Court for the Eastern District of Pennsylvania created by 33 Stat. 155. He was confirmed by the United States Senate on April 19, 1904, and received his commission the same day. Holland served in that capacity until his death on April 24, 1914, in Conshohocken, Pennsylvania.

== Sources ==
Legal offices
Preceded by Seat established by 33 Stat. 155	Judge of the United States District Court for the Eastern District of Pennsylvania; 1904–1914	Succeeded by Seat abolished
