= Daniel Henry Huyett III =

American judge

Senior Judge of the United States District Court for the Eastern District of Pennsylvania
- In office May 1, 1988 – May 1, 1998

Judge of the United States District Court for the Eastern District of Pennsylvania
- In office October 15, 1970 – May 1, 1988
- Appointed by: Richard Nixon
- Preceded by: Seat established by 84 Stat. 294
- Succeeded by: Jay Waldman

Personal details
- Born: Daniel Henry Huyett III; May 2, 1921 Reading, Pennsylvania
- Died: May 1, 1998 (aged 76) Reading, Pennsylvania
- Education: University of Michigan (A.B.); University of Pennsylvania Law School (J.D.)

Daniel Henry Huyett III (May 2, 1921 – May 1, 1998) was a United States district judge of the United States District Court for the Eastern District of Pennsylvania.

== Education and career ==
Born in Reading, Pennsylvania, Huyett received an Artium Baccalaureus from the University of Michigan in 1942 and a Juris Doctor from the University of Pennsylvania Law School in 1948. He was in the United States Army Air Corps as a Lieutenant during World War II, from 1942 to 1946. He was in private practice in Berks County, Pennsylvania from 1949 to 1970. He was city solicitor of Reading from 1952 to 1956. He was a member of the Pennsylvania Labor Relations Board from 1965 to 1968. He was Commissioner of the Pennsylvania Public Utility Commission from 1968 to 1970. He was a Lecturer at the Federal Judicial Center from 1977 to 1979.

== Federal judicial service ==
Huyett was nominated by President Richard Nixon on September 25, 1970, to the United States District Court for the Eastern District of Pennsylvania, to a new seat created by 84 Stat. 294. He was confirmed by the United States Senate on October 8, 1970, and received his commission on October 15, 1970. He assumed senior status on May 1, 1988, serving in that capacity until his death on May 1, 1998, in Reading.

== Sources ==
Legal offices
Preceded by Seat established by 84 Stat. 294	Judge of the United States District Court for the Eastern District of Pennsylvania; 1970–1988	Succeeded by Jay Waldman
