= United States District Court for the Eastern District of Pennsylvania =

United States federal district court in Pennsylvania

- (E.D. Pa.)
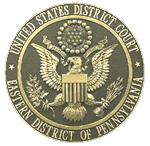

- Location: James A. Byrne U.S. Courthouse (Philadelphia, Pennsylvania, U.S.) More locations: Allentown; Reading; Easton
- Appeals to: Third Circuit
- Established: April 20, 1818
- Judges: 22
- Chief Judge: Wendy Beetlestone

Officers of the court
- U.S. Attorney: David Metcalf
- U.S. Marshal: Eric S. Gartner
- www.paed.uscourts.gov

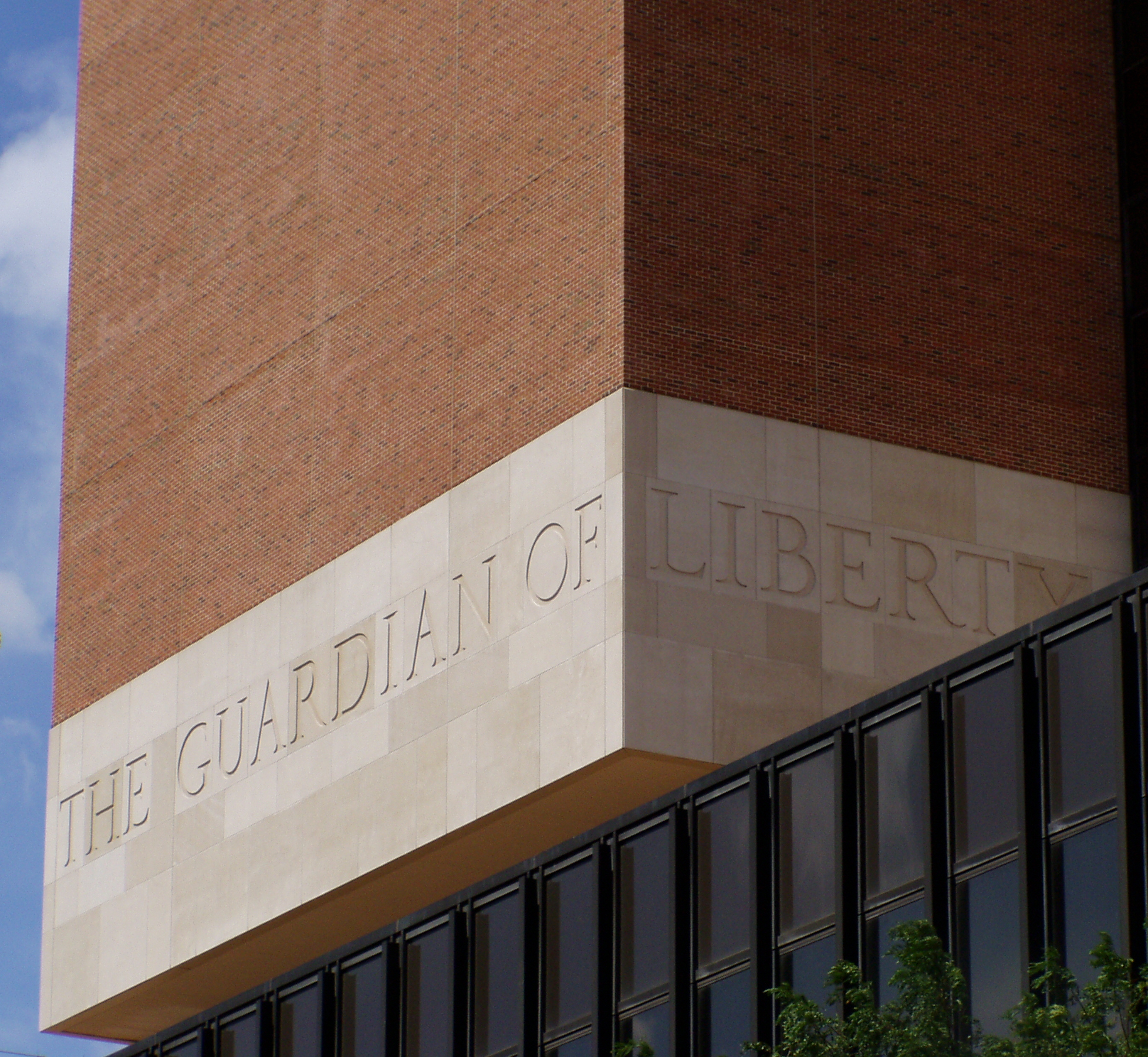
The James A. Byrne United States Courthouse at 601 Market Street in Philadelphia

The United States District Court for the Eastern District of Pennsylvania (in case citations, E.D. Pa.) is one of the original 13 federal judiciary districts created by the Judiciary Act of 1789. It originally sat in Independence Hall in Philadelphia as the United States District Court for the District of Pennsylvania, and is now located at the James Byrne Courthouse at 601 Market Street in Philadelphia. There are four Eastern District federal courtrooms in Pennsylvania: Philadelphia, Allentown, Reading, and Easton.

The Court's jurisdiction includes nine counties in eastern Pennsylvania: Berks, Bucks, Chester, Delaware, Lancaster, Lehigh, Montgomery, Northampton, and Philadelphia counties. The district is a part of the Third Circuit. Appeals are taken to that Circuit, except for patent claims and claims against the U.S. government under the Tucker Act, which are appealed to the Federal Circuit.

The chief judge for the Eastern Pennsylvania District Court is Wendy Beetlestone.

The United States attorney for the Eastern District of Pennsylvania represents the people in the district. On June 24, 2025, the United States District Court for the Eastern District of Pennsylvania appointed David Metcalf as the United States Attorney for the district; this came 120 days after Attorney General Pamela Bondi appointed Metcalf to serve as interim United States Attorney on March 12, 2025.

== History ==
The United States District Court for the District of Pennsylvania was one of the original 13 courts established by the Judiciary Act of 1789, 1 Stat. 73, on September 24, 1789. It was subdivided on April 20, 1818, by 3 Stat. 462, into the Eastern and Western Districts to be headquartered in Philadelphia and Pittsburgh, respectively. Portions of these districts were subsequently subdivided into the Middle District on March 2, 1901, by 31 Stat. 880. At the time of its initial subdivision, presiding judge Richard Peters Jr. was reassigned to only the Eastern District.

== Current judges ==
As of August 10, 2026:

#	Title	Judge	Duty station	Born	Term of service			Appointed by
#	Title	Judge	Duty station	Born	Active	Chief	Senior	Appointed by
97	Chief Judge	Wendy Beetlestone	Philadelphia	1961	2014–present	2025–present	—	Obama
86	District Judge	Paul S. Diamond	Philadelphia	1953	2004–present	—	—	G.W. Bush
87	District Judge	Juan Ramon Sánchez	Philadelphia	1955	2004–present	2018–2024	—	G.W. Bush
92	District Judge	Nitza Quiñones Alejandro	Philadelphia	1951	2013–present	—	—	Obama
94	District Judge	Jeffrey L. Schmehl	Reading; Philadelphia	1955	2013–present	—	—	Obama
95	District Judge	Gerald A. McHugh Jr.	Philadelphia	1954	2014–present	—	—	Obama
98	District Judge	Mark A. Kearney	Philadelphia	1962	2014–present	—	—	Obama
99	District Judge	Jerry Pappert	Philadelphia	1963	2014–present	—	—	Obama
100	District Judge	Joseph F. Leeson Jr.	Allentown; Philadelphia	1955	2014–present	—	—	Obama
101	District Judge	Chad F. Kenney	Philadelphia	1955	2018–present	—	—	Trump
102	District Judge	Joshua Wolson	Philadelphia	1974	2019–present	—	—	Trump
103	District Judge	John Milton Younge	Philadelphia	1955	2019–present	—	—	Trump
104	District Judge	Karen S. Marston	Philadelphia	1968	2019–present	—	—	Trump
105	District Judge	John M. Gallagher	Allentown	1966	2019–present	—	—	Trump
106	District Judge	Mia Roberts Perez	Philadelphia	1981	2022–present	—	—	Biden
107	District Judge	Kelley B. Hodge	Philadelphia	1971	2022–present (Note: By virtue of her seniority of age, Judge Hodge holds seniority over Judge Murphy despite their identical commission dates.)	—	—	Biden
108	District Judge	John Frank Murphy	Philadelphia	1977	2022–present	—	—	Biden
109	District Judge	Kai Scott	Philadelphia	1970	2023–present	—	—	Biden
110	District Judge	Mary Kay Costello	Philadelphia	1968	2024–present	—	—	Biden
111	District Judge	Catherine Henry	Easton; Philadelphia	1969	2024–present	—	—	Biden
112	District Judge	Gail A. Weilheimer	Philadelphia	1970	2025–present	—	—	Biden
113	District Judge	Antonio Pozos	Philadelphia	1982	2026–present	—	—	Trump
58	Senior Judge	Robert F. Kelly	inactive	1935	1987–2001	—	2001–present	Reagan
65	Senior Judge	Ronald L. Buckwalter	inactive	1936	1990–2003	—	2003–present	G.H.W. Bush
66	Senior Judge	Harvey Bartle III	Philadelphia	1941	1991–2011	2006–2011	2011–present	G.H.W. Bush
69	Senior Judge	John R. Padova	Philadelphia	1935	1992–2008	—	2008–present	G.H.W. Bush
72	Senior Judge	Anita B. Brody	Philadelphia	1935	1992–2009	—	2009–present	G.H.W. Bush
76	Senior Judge	Petrese B. Tucker	inactive	1951	2000–2021	2013–2017	2021–present	Clinton
78	Senior Judge	Richard Barclay Surrick	Philadelphia	1937	2000–2011	—	2011–present	Clinton
79	Senior Judge	Legrome D. Davis	inactive	1952	2002–2017	—	2017–present	G.W. Bush
80	Senior Judge	Cynthia M. Rufe	Philadelphia	1948	2002–2021	—	2021–present	G.W. Bush
81	Senior Judge	Michael Baylson	Philadelphia	1939	2002–2012	—	2012–present	G.W. Bush
82	Senior Judge	Timothy J. Savage	Philadelphia	1946	2002–2021	—	2021–present	G.W. Bush
89	Senior Judge	Joel Harvey Slomsky	Philadelphia	1946	2008–2018	—	2018–present	G.W. Bush
90	Senior Judge	C. Darnell Jones II	inactive	1949	2008–2021	—	2021–present	G.W. Bush

== Former judges ==
#	Judge	Born–died	Active service	Chief Judge	Senior status	Appointed by	Reason for termination
1	Richard Peters	1744–1828	1818–1828 (Note: Reassigned from the District of Pennsylvania.)	—	—	Washington/Operation of law	death
2	Joseph Hopkinson	1770–1842	1828–1842 (Note: Recess appointment; formally nominated on December 11, 1828, confirmed by the United States Senate on February 23, 1829, and received commission the same day.)	—	—	J.Q. Adams	death
3	Archibald Randall	1797–1846	1842–1846	—	—	Tyler	death
4	John K. Kane	1795–1858	1846–1858	—	—	Polk	death
5	John Cadwalader	1805–1879	1858–1879	—	—	Buchanan	death
6	William Butler	1822–1909	1879–1899	—	—	Hayes	retirement
7	John Bayard McPherson	1846–1919	1899–1912	—	—	McKinley	elevation
8	James Buchanan Holland	1857–1914	1904–1914	—	—	T. Roosevelt	death
9	Joseph Whitaker Thompson	1861–1946	1912–1931	—	—	Taft	elevation
10	Oliver Booth Dickinson	1857–1939	1914–1939	—	—	Wilson	death
11	Charles Louis McKeehan	1876–1925	1923–1925	—	—	Harding	death
12	William H. Kirkpatrick	1885–1970	1927–1958	1948–1958	1958–1970	Coolidge	death
13	George Austin Welsh	1878–1970	1932–1957	—	1957–1970	Hoover	death
14	Albert Branson Maris	1893–1989	1936–1938	—	—	F. Roosevelt	elevation
15	Harry Ellis Kalodner	1896–1977	1938–1946 (Note: Recess appointment; formally nominated on January 5, 1939, confirmed by the Senate on March 30, 1939, and received commission on May 4, 1939.)	—	—	F. Roosevelt	elevation
16	Guy K. Bard	1895–1953	1939–1952 (Note: Recess appointment; formally nominated on April 4, 1940, confirmed by the Senate on April 24, 1940, and received commission on April 29, 1940.)	—	—	F. Roosevelt	resignation
17	James Cullen Ganey	1899–1972	1940–1961	1958–1961	—	F. Roosevelt	elevation
18	Frederick Voris Follmer	1885–1971	1946–1955 (Note: Jointly appointed to the Eastern, Middle, and Western Districts of Pennsylvania)	—	—	Truman	reassignment
19	James P. McGranery	1895–1962	1946–1952	—	—	Truman	resignation
20	Thomas James Clary	1899–1977	1949–1969 (Note: Recess appointment; formally nominated on January 5, 1950, confirmed by the Senate on March 8, 1950, and received commission on March 9, 1950.)	1961–1969	1969–1977	Truman	death
21	Allan Kuhn Grim	1904–1965	1949–1961 (Note: Recess appointment; formally nominated on January 5, 1950, confirmed by the Senate on April 4, 1950, and received commission on April 7, 1950.)	—	1961–1965	Truman	death
22	John W. Lord Jr.	1901–1972	1954–1971	1969–1971	1971–1972	Eisenhower	death
23	Francis Lund Van Dusen	1912–1993	1955–1967	—	—	Eisenhower	elevation
24	Charles William Kraft Jr.	1903–2002	1955–1970 (Note: Recess appointment; formally nominated on January 12, 1956, confirmed by the Senate on March 28, 1956, and received commission on March 29, 1956.)	—	1970–2002	Eisenhower	death
25	Thomas C. Egan	1894–1961	1957–1961	—	—	Eisenhower	death
26	Harold Kenneth Wood	1906–1972	1959–1971	—	1971–1972	Eisenhower	death
27	Joseph Simon Lord III	1912–1991	1961–1982	1971–1982	1982–1991	Kennedy	death
28	Abraham Lincoln Freedman	1904–1971	1961–1964	—	—	Kennedy	elevation
29	Alfred Leopold Luongo	1920–1986	1961–1986	1982–1986	—	Kennedy	death
30	Ralph C. Body	1903–1973	1962–1972	—	1972–1973	Kennedy	death
31	A. Leon Higginbotham Jr.	1928–1998	1964–1977 (Note: Recess appointment; formally nominated on February 3, 1964, confirmed by the Senate on March 14, 1964, and received commission on March 17, 1964.)	—	—	L. Johnson	elevation
32	John Morgan Davis	1906–1984	1964–1974	—	1974–1984	L. Johnson	death
33	John P. Fullam	1921–2018	1966–1990	1986–1990	1990–2018	L. Johnson	death
34	Charles R. Weiner	1922–2005	1967–1988	—	1988–2005	L. Johnson	death
35	Thomas Ambrose Masterson	1927–2000	1967–1973	—	—	L. Johnson	resignation
36	Emanuel Mac Troutman	1915–2004	1967–1982	—	1982–2004	L. Johnson	death
37	John Berne Hannum	1915–2007	1969–1984	—	1984–2007	Nixon	death
38	Edward R. Becker	1933–2006	1970–1982	—	—	Nixon	elevation
39	John William Ditter Jr.	1921–2019	1970–1986	—	1986–2019	Nixon	death
40	Daniel Henry Huyett III	1921–1998	1970–1988	—	1988–1998	Nixon	death
41	Donald West VanArtsdalen	1919–2019	1970–1985	—	1985–2019	Nixon	death
42	James Henry Gorbey	1920–1977	1970–1977	—	—	Nixon	death
43	Raymond J. Broderick	1914–2000	1971–1984	—	1984–2000	Nixon	death
44	Clarence Charles Newcomer	1923–2005	1971–1988	—	1988–2005	Nixon	death
45	Clifford Scott Green	1923–2007	1971–1988	—	1988–2007	Nixon	death
46	Louis Bechtle	1927–2024	1972–1993	1990–1993	1993–2001	Nixon	retirement
47	Herbert Allan Fogel	1929–2002	1973–1978	—	—	Nixon	resignation
48	Joseph Leo McGlynn Jr.	1925–1999	1974–1990	—	1990–1999	Nixon	death
49	Edward N. Cahn	1933–present	1974–1998	1993–1998	—	Ford	retirement
50	Louis H. Pollak	1922–2012	1978–1991	—	1991–2012	Carter	death
51	Norma Levy Shapiro	1928–2016	1978–1998	—	1998–2016	Carter	death
52	James T. Giles	1943–present	1979–2008	1999–2005	2008–2008	Carter	retirement
53	Thomas Newman O'Neill Jr.	1928–2018	1983–1996	—	1996–2018	Reagan	death
54	Marvin Katz	1930–2010	1983–1997	—	1997–2010	Reagan	death
55	James McGirr Kelly	1928–2005	1983–1996	—	1996–2005	Reagan	death
56	Anthony Joseph Scirica	1940–present	1984–1987	—	—	Reagan	elevation
57	Edmund V. Ludwig	1928–2016	1985–1997	—	1997–2016	Reagan	death
59	Robert S. Gawthrop III	1942–1999	1987–1999	—	—	Reagan	death
60	Franklin Van Antwerpen	1941–2016	1987–2004	—	—	Reagan	elevation
61	Lowell A. Reed Jr.	1930–2020	1988–1999	—	1999–2020	Reagan	death
62	Jan E. DuBois	1931–2026	1988–2002	—	2002–2026	Reagan	death
63	Herbert J. Hutton	1937–2007	1988–2003	—	2003–2007	Reagan	death
64	Jay Waldman	1944–2003	1988–2003	—	—	Reagan	death
67	Stewart Dalzell	1943–2019	1991–2013	—	2013–2016	G.H.W. Bush	retirement
68	William H. Yohn Jr.	1935–2026	1991–2003	—	2003–2026	G.H.W. Bush	death
70	J. Curtis Joyner	1948–present	1992–2013	2011–2013	2013–2021	G.H.W. Bush	retirement
71	Eduardo C. Robreno	1945–present	1992–2013	—	2013–2023	G.H.W. Bush	retirement
73	Marjorie Rendell	1947–present	1994–1997	—	—	Clinton	elevation
74	Bruce William Kauffman	1934–2021	1997–2008	—	2008–2009	Clinton	retirement
75	Mary A. McLaughlin	1946–present	2000–2013	—	2013–2020	Clinton	retirement
77	Berle M. Schiller	1944–2025	2000–2012	—	2012–2025	Clinton	death
83	James Knoll Gardner	1940–2017	2002–2017	—	2017	G.W. Bush	death
84	Gene E. K. Pratter	1949–2024	2004–2024	—	—	G.W. Bush	death
85	Lawrence F. Stengel	1952–present	2004–2018	2017–2018	—	G.W. Bush	retirement
88	Thomas M. Golden	1947–2010	2006–2010	—	—	G.W. Bush	death
91	Mitchell S. Goldberg	1959–present	2008–2025	2024–2025	—	G.W. Bush	retirement
93	L. Felipe Restrepo	1959–present	2013–2016	—	—	Obama	elevation
96	Edward G. Smith	1961–2023	2014–2023	—	—	Obama	death

== Chief judges ==
Chief judges have administrative responsibilities with respect to their district court. Unlike the Supreme Court, where one justice is specifically nominated to be chief, the office of chief judge rotates among the district court judges. To be chief, a judge must have been in active service on the court for at least one year, be under the age of 65, and have not previously served as chief judge.

A vacancy is filled by the judge highest in seniority among the group of qualified judges. The chief judge serves for a term of seven years, or until age 70, whichever occurs first. The age restrictions are waived if no members of the court would otherwise be qualified for the position.

When the office was created in 1948, the chief judge was the longest-serving judge who had not elected to retire, on what has since 1958 been known as senior status, or declined to serve as chief judge. After August 6, 1959, judges could not become or remain chief after turning 70 years old. The current rules have been in operation since October 1, 1982.

== Succession of seats ==
Seat 1
Seat established on September 24, 1789 by 1 Stat. 73 for the District of Pennsylvania
Seat reassigned to the Eastern District of Pennsylvania on April 20, 1818 by 3 Stat. 462
Peters, Jr.	1818–1828
Hopkinson	1828–1842
Randall	1842–1846
Kane	1846–1858
Cadwalader	1858–1879
Butler	1879–1899
McPherson	1899–1912
Thompson	1912–1931
Welsh	1932–1957
Egan	1957–1961
J. M. Davis	1964–1974
Cahn	1974–1998
Savage	2002–2021
Perez	2022–present

Seat 2
Seat established on April 1, 1904 by 33 Stat. 155
Holland	1904–1914
Seat abolished on April 24, 1914 (temporary judgeship expired)

Seat 3
Seat established on February 16, 1914 by 38 Stat. 283 (temporary)
Seat became permanent upon the abolition of Seat 2 on April 24, 1914
Dickenson	1914–1939
Bard	1939–1952
Van Dusen	1955–1967
Hannum	1969–1984
Scirica	1984–1987
Reed, Jr.	1988–1999
Surrick	2000–2011
Quiñones Alejandro	2013–present

Seat 4
Seat established on September 14, 1922 by 42 Stat. 837 (temporary)
McKeehan	1923–1925
Seat abolished on March 23, 1925 (temporary judgeship expired)

Seat 5
Seat established on March 3, 1927 by 44 Stat. 1347
Kirkpatrick	1927–1958
Wood	1959–1971
Green	1971–1988
DuBois	1988–2002
Gardner	2002–2017
Wolson	2019–present

Seat 6
Seat established on June 16, 1936 by 49 Stat. 1523 (temporary)
Seat made permanent on June 2, 1938 by 52 Stat. 780
Maris	1936–1938
Kalodner	1939–1946
McGranery	1946–1952
J. W. Lord, Jr.	1954–1971
Bechtle	1972–1993
Rendell	1994–1997
Seat abolished on November 20, 1997 (temporary judgeship expired)

Seat 7
Seat established on May 24, 1940 by 54 Stat. 219 (temporary)
Seat made permanent on December 7, 1944 by 58 Stat. 796
Ganey	1940–1961
Higginbotham, Jr.	1964–1977
Pollak	1978–1991
Robreno	1992–2013
Leeson, Jr.	2014–present

Seat 8
Seat established on July 24, 1946 by 60 Stat. 654 (temporary, concurrent with Middle and Western Districts)
Seat made permanent on February 10, 1954 by 68 Stat. 8
Follmer	1946–1955
Seat statutorily assigned solely to the Middle District on June 1, 1955

Seat 9
Seat established on August 3, 1949 by 63 Stat. 493
Clary	1950–1969
Seat abolished on March 1, 1969 (temporary judgeship expired)

Seat 10
Seat established on August 3, 1949 by 63 Stat. 493
Grim	1949–1961
Body	1962–1972
Fogel	1973–1978
Giles	1979–2008
Slomsky	2008–2018
Gallagher	2019–present

Seat 11
Seat established on February 10, 1954 by 68 Stat. 8
Kraft, Jr.	1956–1970
Newcomer	1971–1988
Hutton	1988–2003
Diamond	2004–present

Seat 12
Seat established on May 19, 1961 by 75 Stat. 80
J. S. Lord III	1961–1982
Katz	1983–1997
McLaughlin	2000–2013
Younge	2019–present

Seat 13
Seat established on May 19, 1961 by 75 Stat. 80
Freedman	1961–1964
Fullam	1966–1990
Yohn, Jr.	1991–2003
Pratter	2004–2024
Weilheimer	2025–present

Seat 14
Seat established on May 19, 1961 by 75 Stat. 80
Luongo	1961–1986
Van Antwerpen	1987–2004
Golden	2006–2010
Schmehl	2013–present

Seat 15
Seat established on March 18, 1966 by 80 Stat. 75 (temporary)
Seat made permanent on June 2, 1970 by 84 Stat. 294
Weiner	1967–1988
Buckwalter	1990–2003
Stengel	2004–2018
Murphy	2022–present

Seat 16
Seat established on March 18, 1966 by 80 Stat. 75 (temporary)
Seat made permanent on June 2, 1970 by 84 Stat. 294
Masterson	1967–1973
McGlynn, Jr.	1974–1990
Bartle III	1991–2011
McHugh, Jr.	2014–present

Seat 17
Seat established on March 18, 1966 by 80 Stat. 75 (temporary)
Seat became permanent upon the abolition of Seat 9 on March 1, 1969
Troutman	1967–1982
J. M. Kelly	1983–1996
Kauffman	1997–2008
Jones II	2008–2021
Scott	2023–present

Seat 18
Seat established on June 2, 1970 by 84 Stat. 294
Becker	1970–1982
O'Neill, Jr.	1983–1996
Tucker	2000–2021
Hodge	2022–present

Seat 19
Seat established on June 2, 1970 by 84 Stat. 294
Ditter, Jr.	1970–1986
Gawthrop III	1987–1999
Schiller	2000–2012
Smith	2014–2023
Henry	2024–present

Seat 20
Seat established on June 2, 1970 by 84 Stat. 294
Huyett III	1970–1988
Waldman	1988–2003
Sánchez	2004–present

Seat 21
Seat established on June 2, 1970 by 84 Stat. 294
VanArtsdalen	1970–1985
R. F. Kelly	1987–2001
Baylson	2002–2012
Beetlestone	2014–present

Seat 22
Seat established on June 2, 1970 by 84 Stat. 294
Gorbey	1970–1977
Shapiro	1978–1998
Rufe	2002–2021
Costello	2024–present

Seat 23
Seat established on June 2, 1970 by 84 Stat. 294
Broderick	1971–1984
Ludwig	1985–1997
L. D. Davis	2002–2017
Marston	2019–present

Seat 24
Seat established on December 1, 1990 by 104 Stat. 5089
Dalzell	1991–2013
Pappert	2014–present

Seat 25
Seat established on December 1, 1990 by 104 Stat. 5089
Padova	1992–2008
Goldberg	2008–2025
Pozos	2026–present

Seat 26
Seat established on December 1, 1990 by 104 Stat. 5089
Joyner	1992–2013
Kearney	2014–present

Seat 27
Seat established on December 1, 1990 by 104 Stat. 5089 (temporary)
Seat became permanent upon the abolition of Seat 6 on November 20, 1997
Brody	1992–2009
Restrepo	2013–2016
Kenney, Sr.	2018–present

== List of U.S. attorneys ==
- William Lewis (1789–1791)
- William Rawle (1791–1799)
- Jared Ingersoll (1800–1801)
- Alexander Dallas (1801–1814)
- Charles Jared Ingersoll (1815–1829)
- George M. Dallas (1829–1831)
- Henry D. Gilpin (1831–1837)
- John M. Read (1837–1841)
- William M. Meredith (1841–1842)
- Henry M. Watts (1842–1845)
- Thomas M. Pettit (1845–1849)
- John W. Ashmead (1849–1854)
- James C. Van Dyke (1854–1857)
- George M. Wharton (1857–1860)
- George A. Coffey (1861–1864)
- Charles Gilpin (1864–1868)
- John P. O'Neil (1868–1869)
- Aubrey H. Smith (1869–1873)
- William McMichael (1873–1875)
- John K. Valentine (1875–1888)
- John R. Read (1888–1892)
- Ellery P. Ingham (1892–1896)
- James M. Beck (1896–1900)
- James Buchanan Holland (1900–1904)
- Joseph Whitaker Thompson (1904–1912)
- John C. Smartley (1912–1913)
- Francis F. Kane (1913–1919)
- Charles D. McAvoy (1920–1921)
- George W. Coles (1921–1929)
- Calvin S. Boyer (1929–1930)
- Howard B. Lewis (Acting) (1931)
- Edward W. Wells (1931–1933)
- Charles D. McAvoy (Second Time) (1933–1937)
- Guy K. Bard (Acting) (1937)
- James Cullen Ganey (1937–1940)
- Edward A. Kallick (Acting) (1940)
- Gerald A. Gleeson (1940–1953)
- Joseph G. Hildenberger (Acting) (1953)
- W. Wilson White (1953–1957)
- G. Clinton Fogwell, Jr. (Acting) (1957)
- Harold Kenneth Wood (1957–1959)
- Joseph Leo McGlynn, Jr. (Acting) (1959)
- Walter E. Alessandroni (1959–1961)
- Joseph Simon Lord III (1961)
- Drew J. T. O'Keefe (1961–1969)
- Louis C. Bechtle (1969–1972)
- Carl Joseph Melone (Acting) (1972)
- Robert E. J. Curran (1972–1976)
- Jonas Clayton Undercofler III (Acting) (1976)
- David W. Marston (1976–1978)
- Robert N. DeLuca (Acting) (1978)
- Peter F. Vaira, Jr. (1978–1983)
- Edward S. G. Dennis, Jr. (1983–1988)
- Michael M. Baylson (1988–1993)
- Michael J. Rotko (Acting) (1993)
- Michael R. Stiles (1993–2001)
- Michael L. Levy (Acting) (2001)
- Pat Meehan (2001–2008)
- Laurie Magid (Acting) (2008–2009)
- Michael L. Levy (Acting, Second Time) (2009–2010)
- Zane David Memeger (2010–2016)
- Louis D. Lappen (Acting) (2016–2018)
- William M. McSwain (2018–2021)
- Jennifer Arbittier Williams (Acting) (2021–2022)
- Jacqueline C. Romero (2022–2025)
- David Metcalf (2025-Present)

== See also ==
- Courts of Pennsylvania
- List of current United States district judges
- List of United States federal courthouses in Pennsylvania
