= Ernie Preate =

American politician

41st Attorney General of Pennsylvania
- In office January 17, 1989 – June 23, 1995
- Governor: Robert P. Casey; Tom Ridge
- Preceded by: LeRoy S. Zimmerman
- Succeeded by: Tom Corbett

Personal details
- Born: November 22, 1940 (age 85) Scranton, Pennsylvania
- Party: Republican
- Education: University of Pennsylvania (BS, JD)
- Profession: lawyer

Ernest D. Preate, Jr. (born November 22, 1940) is a former Republican Pennsylvania Attorney General. As Attorney General, he argued before the United States Supreme Court in the landmark case, Planned Parenthood of Southeast Pennsylvania v. Casey on behalf of Robert P. Casey, then governor of Pennsylvania. Preate also successfully argued another landmark case, Blystone v. Pennsylvania in the United States Supreme Court addressing the death penalty.

Prior to serving as Attorney General, Preate was elected Lackawanna County District Attorney. He ran for Governor of Pennsylvania in 1994, but came in second for the Republican nomination behind then-congressman Tom Ridge, who won the general election.

In 1995, Preate went to jail after pleading guilty to mail fraud charges.

== Early career and education ==
Ernest D. Preate, Jr. was born November 22, 1940, in Scranton, Pennsylvania, the son of Attorney & Mrs. Ernest D. Preate, Sr. Graduate of The Scranton Preparatory School – 1958, University of Pennsylvania, Wharton School, B.S. Economics 1962, University of Pennsylvania Law School, J.D. 1965.

== Military service ==
He served in the United States Marine Corps from 1966 to 1969 as Infantry Platoon Commander. He spent 13 months in combat in Vietnam and was honorably discharged with the rank of Captain. Preate earned 5 medals for combat service.

== Career ==
Preate was elected Lackawanna County District Attorney in 1977 and served until 1989. He was an active trial prosecutor, specializing in homicide and drug cases. As District Attorney, he won all 19 murder cases that went to verdict and obtained the death penalty in 5 cases. His numerous appellate arguments include 2 major cases before the U.S. Supreme Court where he was successful in getting the Court to hold, as Constitutional, Pennsylvania's Death Penalty Law (which he would later argue against) and its Abortion Control Act.

He was a member of the National Association of Attorneys General where his colleagues elected him Chairman of the Criminal Law Committee. He was the Association's official delegate to the American Bar Association, where he was co-founder and first chair of the Government and Public Sector Lawyers Division of the American Bar Association and received numerous awards for his service to law enforcement and the justice system.

== Conviction ==
He was elected Attorney General of Pennsylvania in 1988, taking office in 1989. He was re-elected in 1992, but resigned that position in 1995 after being charged with federal racketeering and corruption. He pleaded guilty to mail fraud involving a $20,000.00 campaign contribution and served a year in Federal prison. He was succeeded as Attorney General by Tom Corbett, who later went on to become Governor of Pennsylvania.

== Later career ==
Since his return to Scranton, he has resumed the practice of law, doing criminal and civil trial work. He has also been retained as a lobbyist by numerous prison and Criminal Justice Reform groups. He has served as a consultant to Chuck Colson's Prison Fellowship in Reston, Virginia, which advocates rehabilitative and faith-based reform of the criminal justice system and has become outspoken about the shortcomings of the U.S. criminal justice system, urging reforms to enable the public to have greater confidence that justice was done in judicial proceedings.

He now believes that there ought to be a moratorium on the carrying out of the death penalty under the very statute he successfully defended in the U.S. Supreme Court. He now believes that as it has been applied, it falls unevenly and unfairly on people of color, and that the criminal justice system often inadequately provides effective assistance of counsel to those accused.

== Reform ==
As a lobbyist, Preate has promoted legislative consideration of public policy initiatives such as provision of tests to prisoners. This proposal was signed into law on July 10, 2002. He also calls for Pennsylvania to do a first in a generation study of the prisoner population to see if there are better ways that the 7,500 mentally ill and intellectually disabled prisoners can be compassionately dealt with, that the 7,000 Hepatitis C prisoners can be effectively treated, that the thousands of sick, disabled, or dying geriatric prisoners can be humanely managed, and, that Pennsylvania's often arbitrary and rehabilitative stifling parole system be revamped. For such advocacy, he was appointed to the Legislative Joint State Government Advocacy Committee studying those issues.

In the Spring of 2008, he testified before the U.S. Congress at the request of Representative John Dingell (Democrat from Michigan), Chair House Judiciary Committee on the reforms to the Prisoner Litigation Control Act. He attributes his changed views to the insight and perspective he experienced as a defendant and prisoner in the Criminal Justice System, and, to his near-death experience as a result of a motorcycle accident he suffered in June, 1997. Because of his work on behalf of prisoners, he was elected to the Boards of the Pennsylvania Prison Society, Justice & Mercy, and, Citizens United for the Rehabilitation of Errants. The Lifers’ Association of Prisoners recently thanked him saying, “You now walk among the powerless, yet your goal remains fixed: Justice for the rich and the poor”.

He was a member of the Pennsylvania Legislature's Joint State Government Commission's Advisory Committee on Wrongful Convictions from 2006 until 2011. He served as Solicitor for the Borough of Clark's Summit, Pennsylvania in 2009. From 2010 until 2012, he served as Chairman of the Board of the Northeastern Pennsylvania Alliance (NEPA).

== Personal ==
He is the father of twin daughters, Elizabeth and Alexandra, and, a third daughter, Dominique. In 2022, daughter Liz Preate Havey was Chairwoman of Montgomery County, Pennsylvania, Republicans.

Legal offices
Preceded by LeRoy S. Zimmerman	Attorney General of Pennsylvania; 1989–1995	Succeeded by Tom Corbett
Party political offices
Preceded by LeRoy S. Zimmerman	Republican nominee for Attorney General of Pennsylvania; 1988, 1992	Succeeded by Mike Fisher
