= List of members of the Federal Retirement Thrift Investment Board =

This is a list of members of the Federal Retirement Thrift Investment Board.

The Federal Retirement Thrift Investment Board was created by the United States Congress in 1986 to manage the Thrift Savings Plan, the retirement plan for members of the uniformed services and Federal Government employees.

== Chairmen of the Federal Retirement Thrift Investment Board (1986–present) ==
Name	Term	Appointed by
Michael F. Gerber	2022–present	Joe Biden
Michael Kennedy	2011–2022	Barack Obama
Andrew Saul	2002–2011	George W. Bush
James H. Atkins	1994–2002	Bill Clinton ('94); Bill Clinton ('97); Bill Clinton ('00)
Roger W. Mehle	1986–1994	Ronald Reagan ('86); Ronald Reagan ('88); George H. W. Bush ('91)

== Executive Directors of the Federal Retirement Thrift Investment Board (1986–present) ==
Name	Term
Gregory T. Long	2007–2017
Gary A. Amelio	2002–2007
James Petrick	2002
Roger W. Mehle	1994–2002
Francis X. Cavanaugh	1986–1994

== Members of the Federal Retirement Thrift Investment Board (1986–present) ==
Name	Term	Appointed by
Stacie Olivares	2023–present	Joe Biden
Leona M. Bridges	2023–present	Joe Biden
Michael F. Gerber	2022–present	Joe Biden
Dana Bilyeu	2010–present	Barack Obama
Michael Kennedy	2010–2018	Barack Obama
Ronald McCray	2011–2016	Barack Obama
David Jones	2011–2022	Barack Obama
Gordon J. Whiting	2002–2010	George W. Bush
Terrence A. Duffy	2002–2013	George W. Bush
Tom Fink	1997–2010	George W. Bush; Bill Clinton
John Train	1994–2002	Bill Clinton
Don Harrell	1994–2002	Bill Clinton
Sheryl R. Marshall	1994–2002	Bill Clinton
Shirley Chilton	1992–1994	George H.W. Bush
