= Pennsylvania House of Representatives, District 148 =

American legislative district

Pennsylvania's 148th State House of Representatives district
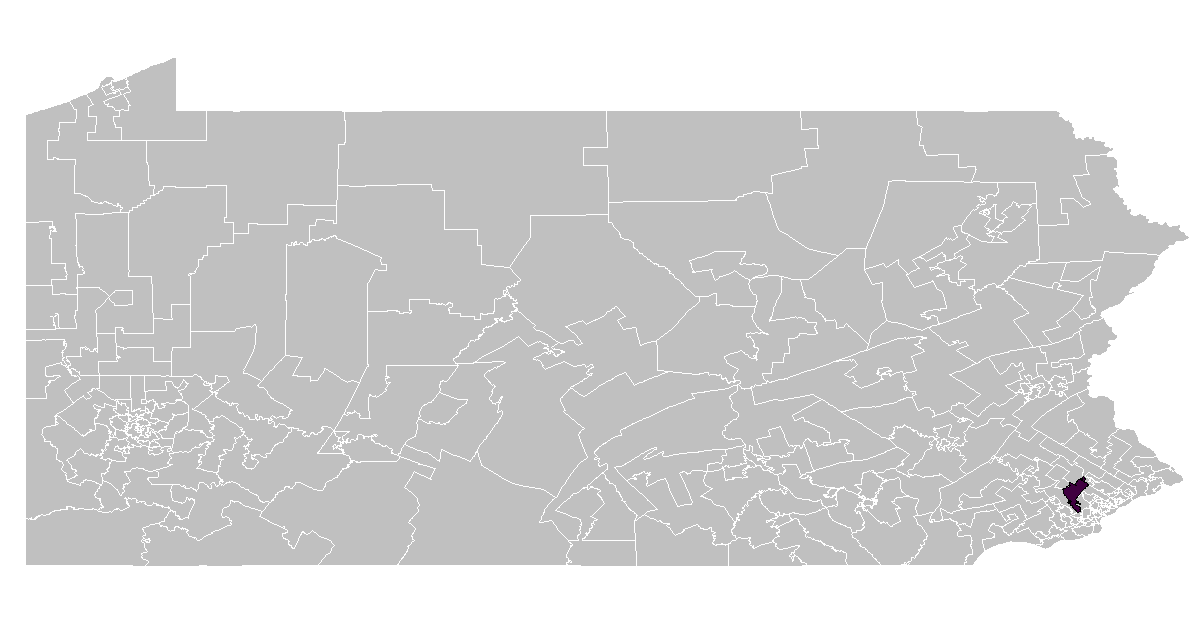
Representative
Mary Jo Daley; D–Narberth
- Demographics: 87.8% White; 5.1% Black; 2.8% Hispanic
- Population (2011) • Citizens of voting age: 63,904; 50,014

The 148th Pennsylvania House of Representatives District is located in Southeastern Pennsylvania and has been represented since 2013 by Mary Jo Daley.

== District profile ==
The 148th Pennsylvania House of Representatives District is located in Montgomery County. It includes the Narbrook Park Historic District. It is made up of the following areas:

- Ambler
- Conshohocken
- Lower Merion Township (PART)
  - Ward 01
  - Ward 02
  - Ward 12
  - Ward 13 [PART, Divisions 01 and 02]
- Narberth
- Plymouth Township (PART)
  - District 01 [PART, Division 02]
  - District 03
  - District 04
- Whitemarsh Township
- Whitpain Township (PART, Districts 04 and 05)

== Representatives ==
Representative	Party	Years	District home	Note
Prior to 1969, seats were apportioned by county.
Joseph L. Torak	Republican	1969 – 1970		
Anthony Joseph Scirica	Republican	1971 – 1980		Resigned January 7, 1980
Lois Sherman Hagerty	Republican	1980 – 1992		Elected March 11, 1980, to fill vacancy
Lita Indzel Cohen	Republican	1993 – 2002		
Melissa Murphy Weber	Republican	2003 – 2004		
Michael F. Gerber	Democrat	2005 – 2013	Whitpain Township	
Mary Jo Daley	Democrat	2013 – present	Narberth	Incumbent

== Recent election results ==
PA House election, 2010: Pennsylvania House, District 148
Party	Candidate	Votes	%	±%
Democratic	Michael F. Gerber	16,876	61.95	
Republican	Matt Maguire	10,367	38.05	
Margin of victory		6,509	23.90	
Turnout		27,243	100	

PA House election, 2012: Pennsylvania House, District 148
Party	Candidate	Votes	%	±%
Democratic	Mary Jo Daley	21,414	58.67	
Republican	Mike Ludwig	15,088	41.33	
Margin of victory		6,326	17.34	
Turnout		36,502	100	

PA House election, 2014: Pennsylvania House, District 148
Party	Candidate	Votes	%	±%
Democratic	Mary Jo Daley	14,726	61.97	
Republican	Ed Flocco	9,039	38.03	
Margin of victory		5,687	23.94	▲6.60
Turnout		5,687	100	

PA House election, 2016: Pennsylvania House, District 148
Party	Candidate	Votes	%	±%
Democratic	Mary Jo Daley	24,669	63.48	
Republican	Ed Flocco	14,193	36.52	
Margin of victory		10,476	26.96	▲3.02
Turnout		38,862	100	
