= My Cousin Momo =

My Cousin Momo is a 2015 children's book by Zachariah OHora.

A flying squirrel named Momo visits his cousins at their house. His cousins dislike his nature, which they perceive as eccentric. Upset, Momo prepares to leave, and his cousins, now feeling remorseful, try to get him to not leave.

Kirkus Reviews gave a positive review, stating that the story "soars".

Publishers Weekly also gave a positive review, stating that the author "could paint stones in the street and make them funny."

A review posted on School Library Journal stated that the artwork is "humorous" and "touching".

== See also ==
- Carl the Collector
- Niblet & Ralph
- Wolfie the Bunny
