= Philadelphia Surgery Center =

Coordinates: 40°0′22″N 75°15′37″W

Geography
- Location: Narberth, Montgomery County, Pennsylvania, USA

Organisation
- Care system: Private Ambulatory Care Facility
- Type: Specialist

Services
- Standards: Certified by AAAHC, State License #23291501
- Beds: 5
- Speciality: Spine Surgery

History
- Founded: December 2013

Links
- Website: www.philadelphiasurgerycenter.com
- Lists: Hospitals in the United States

The Philadelphia Surgery Center is a medical facility in Narberth, Pennsylvania, that specializes in small-scale endoscopic spine surgery for the treatment of spinal stenosis and herniated or fragmented spinal discs.

== History ==
The Philadelphia Surgery Center was founded in 2013. The large facility was newly built and opened in December 2013, and was the first medical facility in the Eastern United States to offer ultra-small endoscopic spine surgery to treat spinal stenosis and herniated or fragmented discs.

== Facility and current operations ==
The Philadelphia Surgery Center is a two operating-room, five recovery-bed, facility, licensed by the Pennsylvania Department of Health, and accredited by the Accreditation Association for Ambulatory Health Care. Problems of pain, numbness or weakness (sciatica) caused by the pinching of spinal nerves by bulging, herniated, extruded or free fragmented discs (possibly causing spinal stenosis) are treated there. To avoid surgical harm and the lasting ill effects common after typical spine surgery, surgeons at the centre use a very small scope that fits through existing, natural windows in the spine, instead of cutting and making new openings. The methodology for doing ultra-small endoscopic spine surgery was developed in California.
