= Wolfie the Bunny =

Wolfie the Bunny is a 2015 children's book written by Ame Dyckman with illustrations by Zachariah OHora. It was published by Little, Brown.

In the book, a wolf named Wolfie grows up with a family of rabbits and, when grown, walks around wearing a rabbit suit. Dot, an actual rabbit, is at first wary of the wolf and argues with her parents over them keeping the wolf. At the end, she defends the wolf from a bear, while the wolf shows that he loves her and her family. Betsy Bird of School Library Journal stated that Dot was the actual main character.

According to the author, her daughter would become a "wolf baby" at times during the years she was a toddler, and this gave her an idea to write this book.

== Art style ==
Publishers Weekly describes the book's art style as "folk-naïf". Dot's expression differs when she shows anger versus what Publishers Weekly calls her "sweet bunny countenance", and the publication states the difference between the two is humorous and "irresistible".

== Reception ==
Publishers Weekly gave a starred review, and states that the book "[pokes] gentle fun at hipster families".

Kirkus Reviews described the book as "pretty adorable". Publishers Weekly stated that the ending is a "gratifying showdown".

Martha V. Parravano of The Horn Book argued that the conflict between Dot and her parents is humorous.

== See also ==
- Carl the Collector
- My Cousin Momo
- Niblet & Ralph
