= Shirley Chilton =

Conservative economist and first female chair of statewide chamber of commerce

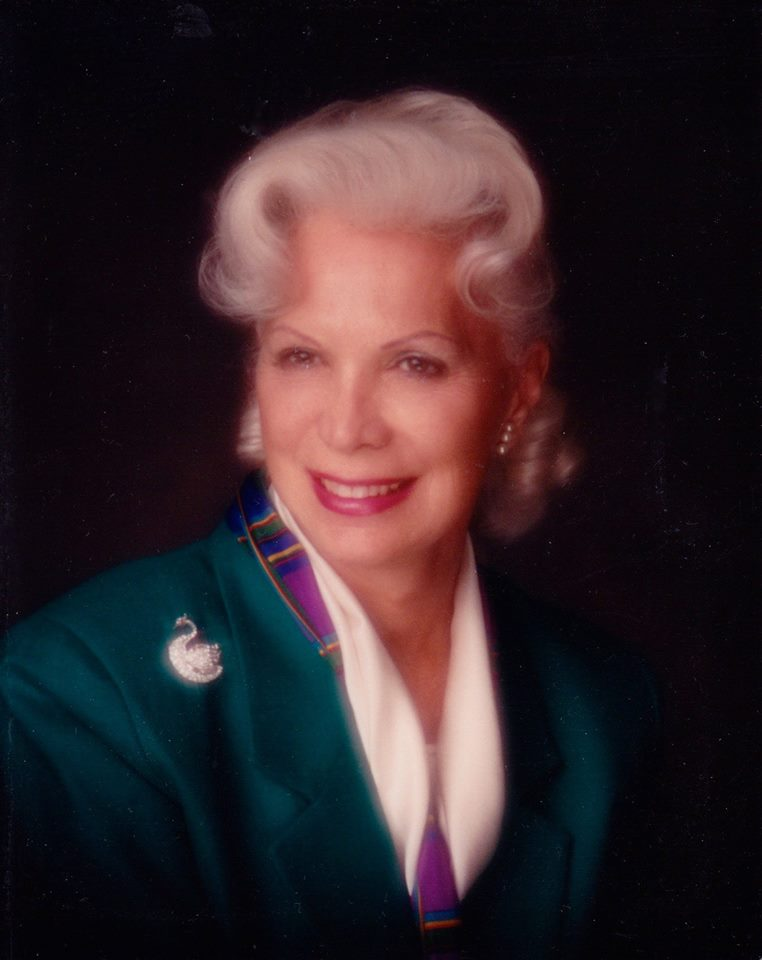
- Shirley Chilton

California Secretary of State and Consumer Services
- In office 1983–1991
- Governor: George Deukmejian

Personal details
- Born: April 3, 1923 Vancouver, Washington, US
- Died: June 30, 2013 (aged 90) Agoura Hills, California, US
- Party: Republican
- Education: University of Washington, Pepperdine
- Profession: Stockbroker

Dr. Shirley R. Chilton (April 3, 1923 – June 30, 2013) was a California businessperson who was the first woman to chair a statewide chamber of commerce when she became the chairwoman of the California Chamber of Commerce in 1982 and later served as California's Secretary of State and Consumer Services, serving under Governor George Deukmejian from 1983 to 1991. On June 30, 2013, she died in Agoura Hills, California after a long illness.

== Personal life and early career ==
Chilton was born Shirley Ray Shafer on April 3, 1923, in Vancouver, Washington. She attended the University of Washington in Seattle, eventually relocating to California to become a social worker. She subsequently received both a Master of Business Administration and Doctor of Education from Pepperdine University in Malibu. She was married three times, notably to Frederick Roy Chilton (former president of Thomas Organ Company, Estey Organ, and Optigan and creator of the Chilton Talentmaker) and later in life to her former high school sweetheart, Raymond O'Dell. She had three sons.

== Business career ==
After spending several years as a social worker, a housewife and mother, a model, a flight attendant, and in various secretarial positions, Chilton was hired in 1955 to be a switchboard operator at Daniel Reeves & Co., a brokerage in Los Angeles. Working her way up through the ranks, Chilton became an assistant vice president of Hayden, Stone & Co. when that firm acquired several offices of Daniel Reeves. By 1965, she was the first woman to be elected as an equity holder of the firm. and was regularly speaking on investment topics around the country to audiences of both men and women interested in learning more about investing. In 1971, she rejoined Daniel Reeves as chairwoman and chief executive officer, making her the first woman to be chief of a West Coast brokerage firm and one of the first women to hold a seat on the New York Stock Exchange. Following her tenure at Daniel Reeves, Chilton joined the Clavis Corporation, a real estate investment firm, as chairwoman. During her tenure at Clavis, she was the first woman to chair the California Chamber of Commerce, serving as chairwoman in 1982.

Throughout her time in the business world, Chilton maintained an active academic career, teaching economics, marketing, and organizational management at Pepperdine. Beginning in 1979, Chilton acted as a director of the National Development Council, one of the oldest national non-profit community and economic development organizations in the United States. Through the National Development Council, Chilton worked to increase the flow of capital for investment, jobs and community development across the country. Chilton was particularly interested in bringing economic education to young people and worked closely with educators in California to develop curricula. Additionally, she co-wrote a series of children's books on the subject, Economics for Young People that included the titles Everyone Has Important Jobs To Do, How People Learned To Move About, How Things Are Made, and Where Things Come From.

== Political career ==
In 1983, George Deukmejian nominated Chilton to be the California Secretary of State and Consumer Services. She was the only woman to serve in Governor Deukmejian's cabinet. In this capacity, she oversaw numerous state departments, including the California Franchise Tax Board, CalPERS, and CalSTRS. She was also responsible for working with consumer groups to address concerns regarding product safety and similar issues. During her tenure as California Secretary of State and Consumer Services, Exposition Park, overseen by Chilton's department and home to the Los Angeles Memorial Coliseum, played host to the 1984 Summer Olympics.

Following her term as Secretary of State and Consumer Services, President George H. W. Bush nominated her in 1992 to serve on the Federal Retirement Thrift Investment Board. She was confirmed by the unanimous consent of the United States Senate and served a two-year term on the board.

== Later activities ==
While still Secretary of State and Consumer Services, Chilton was elected to the board of directors of Blue Shield of California. She continued to hold this position while serving on the Federal Retirement Thrift Investment Board. She also worked as an arbitrator, hearing disputes for the National Association of Securities Dealers, New York Stock Exchange, Ford Motor Company, and the American Arbitration Association. In her retirement, Chilton continued teaching economics and mediation and remained active in the California Republican Party and Rotary International.
