= Mary Jo Daley =

American politician (born 1949)

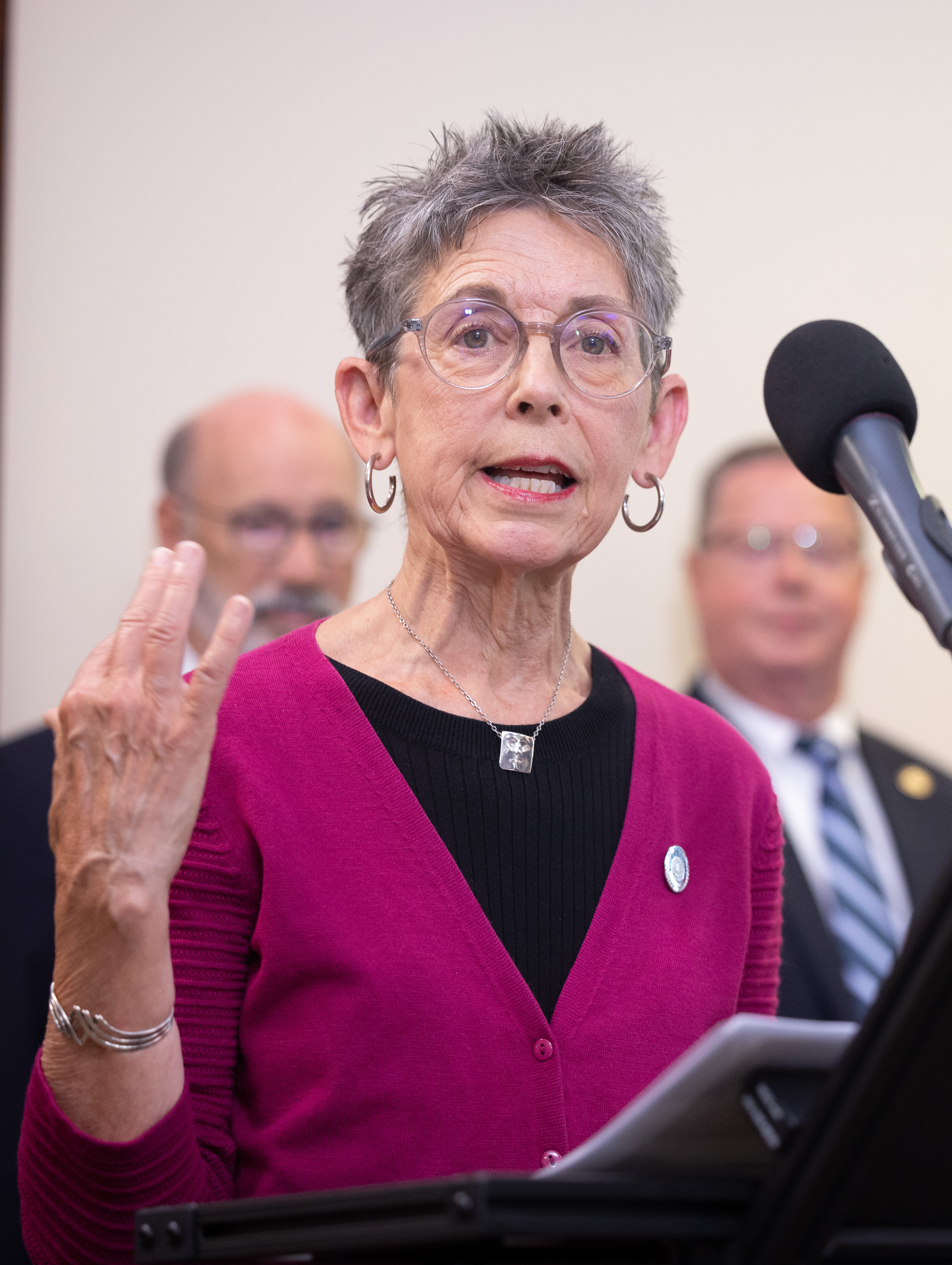

Member of the Pennsylvania House of Representatives from the 148th district
- Incumbent
- Assumed office January 1, 2013
- Preceded by: Michael F. Gerber

Personal details
- Born: September 16, 1949 (age 76)
- Party: Democratic
- Spouse: Bob Winkelman
- Children: 1
- Education: Gwynedd Mercy College (A.S.); University of Pennsylvania (B.B.A., M.P.A.)

Mary Josephine Daley (born September 16, 1949) is an American politician. She is currently Democratic member of the Pennsylvania House of Representatives, representing the 148th District since 2013.

== Early life and education ==
Daley was born on September 16, 1949, in Philadelphia, Pennsylvania. She graduated from Prendergast High School in 1967. Daley earned an associate degree in science from Gwynedd Mercy College in 1969. She earned additional degrees, a Bachelor of Business Administration and a Master of Public Administration, from the University of Pennsylvania in 1987 and 2001, respectively.

== Career ==
From 1992 to 2013, Daley was a financial and administrative official for the University of Pennsylvania.

First elected in 1991 and concluding in 2011, Daley served on the borough council of Narberth, Pennsylvania. For the final ten years she was the council's president. In 1998, Daley unsuccessfully sought election to the Pennsylvania House of Representatives.

After Representative Michael F. Gerber withdrew, the Montgomery County Democratic Committee chose Daley to replace Gerber as the nominee for the 148th district in the 2012 election. She defeated Republican candidate Mike Ludwig in the election. Daley was continuously re-elected until announcing her retirement ahead of the 2026 election. Since 2023, Daley had chaired the State House's Tourism & Economic & Recreational Development Committee.

Daley announced a campaign for Pennsylvania's newly drawn 4th Congressional District in February 2018. She would dropout in April and endorsed Madeleine Dean.

== Personal life ==
Daley lives in her hometown of Narberth with her husband Bob Winkelman. She has one daughter and two stepchildren.
