= Joseph Torak =

American politician (1935–1998)

Joseph L. Torak

Member of the Pennsylvania House of Representatives from the 148th district
- In office January 7, 1969 – November 30, 1970
- Preceded by: District created
- Succeeded by: Anthony Joseph Scirica

Member of the Pennsylvania House of Representatives from the Montgomery County district
- In office 1967–1968

Personal details
- Born: January 3, 1935
- Died: April 9, 1998 (aged 63)
- Party: Republican

Joseph Leonard Torak, Esquire (January 3, 1935 – April 9, 1998) served as a Republican member of the Pennsylvania House of Representatives. Born in 1935 in Philadelphia, he grew up in borough of Bridgeport, Pennsylvania. After graduating from West Philadelphia Catholic High School and then Villanova University and the Villanova University Law School, he established his law career in Montgomery County. As a member of the Knights of Columbus, Torak earned positions such as Grand Knight and engaged in much community service. In the mid 1970s he established a KofC community center in Bridgeport. He helped kids get off the streets by providing free lunches, a library, sports, and dances for teens. He also organized bingo nights for the neighborhood. In this working class community, the Knights Of Columbus bought a vacant lumber mill. It was converted into a catering hall and was named Camelot; it became Torak's most ambitious project to date. Under Torak's direction, the building was renovated and he actively participated in its daily operation.

As a civil lawyer, Torak worked on estates, wills, and divorces. By the 1980s his law practice became lucrative. He then purchased and was the sole owner of the Lakeside Inn in Limerick, Pennsylvania. He organized major renovations and transformed it into a castle-themed restaurant and catering facility. Torak died in 1998 and was survived by his wife and five children.'
