= Lita Indzel Cohen =

American politician (born 1940)

Member of the Pennsylvania House of Representatives from the 148th district
- In office January 5, 1993 – November 30, 2002
- Preceded by: Lois Sherman Hagerty
- Succeeded by: Melissa Murphy Weber

Personal details
- Born: December 20, 1940 (age 85) Philadelphia, Pennsylvania
- Party: Republican
- Spouse: Stanley S.
- Education: University of Pennsylvania (BA, JD)
- Occupation: Attorney-Business Woman

Portion of a mural in Merion Station, Pennsylvania honoring Lita Indzel Cohen.

Portion of the same mural as partly shown above stating that the mural was made to honor Lita Indzel Cohen.

Lita Indzel Cohen (born December 20, 1940) is a former Republican member of the Pennsylvania House of Representatives.

Cohen is a 1958 graduate of Lower Merion High School. She graduated from the University of Pennsylvania in 1962 and earned her Juris Doctor degree from the University of Pennsylvania Law School in 1965. Her husband, Stanley, is Senior Counsel with Fox Rothschild in Philadelphia.

She was the first woman elected to the Lower Merion Township Planning Commission and served as Lower Merion Township Commissioner for eight years.

She was first elected to represent the 148th legislative district in the Pennsylvania House of Representatives in 1993. She was the Republican nominee in the November 6, 2001 special election in the 17th senatorial district to succeed Richard Tilghman, who retired on August 31, 2001. She lost to fellow State Representative Connie Williams. She did not run for re-election for her House of Representatives seat in 2002 and was succeeded by fellow Republican Melissa Murphy Weber.
