= Anthony Joseph Scirica =

American judge (born 1940)

Anthony Scirica
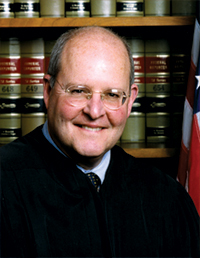
- Judge Scirica (c. 2010)

Senior Judge of the United States Court of Appeals for the Third Circuit
- Incumbent
- Assumed office July 1, 2013

Chief Judge of the United States Court of Appeals for the Third Circuit
- In office May 4, 2003 – May 6, 2010
- Preceded by: Edward R. Becker
- Succeeded by: Theodore McKee

Judge of the United States Court of Appeals for the Third Circuit
- In office August 6, 1987 – July 1, 2013
- Appointed by: Ronald Reagan
- Preceded by: Ruggero J. Aldisert
- Succeeded by: L. Felipe Restrepo

Judge of the United States District Court for the Eastern District of Pennsylvania
- In office September 18, 1984 – September 11, 1987
- Appointed by: Ronald Reagan
- Preceded by: John Berne Hannum
- Succeeded by: Lowell A. Reed Jr.

Member of the Pennsylvania House of Representatives from the 148th district
- In office January 5, 1971 – January 7, 1980
- Preceded by: Joseph Torak
- Succeeded by: Lois Sherman Hagarty

Personal details
- Born: Anthony Joseph Scirica; December 16, 1940 (age 85) Norristown, Pennsylvania, U.S.
- Party: Republican
- Education: Wesleyan University (BA); University of Michigan (JD)

Anthony Joseph Scirica (born December 16, 1940) is a Senior United States circuit judge of the United States Court of Appeals for the Third Circuit.

== Early life and career ==
Scirica was born on December 16, 1940, in Norristown, Pennsylvania. He received a Bachelor of Arts degree from Wesleyan University in 1962. He received a Juris Doctor from the University of Michigan Law School in 1965. He was a Fulbright scholar at Central University of Venezuela in Caracas, Venezuela in 1966. He was in private practice of law in Norristown from 1966 to 1980. He was an assistant district attorney of Montgomery County, Pennsylvania, from 1967 to 1969. He was a Republican Pennsylvania State Representative from 1971 to 1979. He was a Judge on the Court of Common Pleas, Montgomery County from 1980 to 1984.

== Federal judicial service ==
Scirica was nominated by President Ronald Reagan on June 19, 1984, to a seat on the United States District Court for the Eastern District of Pennsylvania vacated by Judge John Berne Hannum. He was confirmed by the United States Senate on September 17, 1984, and received commission on September 18, 1984. His service was terminated on September 11, 1987, due to elevation to the court of appeals.

Scirica was nominated by President Reagan on June 26, 1987, to a seat on the United States Court of Appeals for the Third Circuit vacated by Judge Ruggero J. Aldisert. He was confirmed by the Senate on August 5, 1987, and received commission on August 6, 1987. He served as Chief Judge from 2003 to 2010. He assumed senior status on July 1, 2013.

His former law clerks include former United States Solicitor General Gregory G. Garre, Magistrate Judge Timothy R. Rice, and former White House counsel Dana Remus.

== Notable activities ==
In 1994, Scirica was elected to the American Law Institute and was elected to the ALI Council in May 2011. He chaired an ALI Regional Advisory Group, coordinating the efforts to identify and nominate new members.

In 2008, Chief Justice John Roberts named Scirica to be chairman of the executive committee of the Judicial Conference of the United States.

Scirica joined the faculty of the University of Pennsylvania Law School in July 2013 as a Senior Fellow.

Scirica is a member of the Knight Foundation's Philadelphia Community Advisory Committee.

== Notable cases ==
Scirica wrote a dissent in the Prometheus Radio Project v. FCC case. He authored the unanimous opinion in the Winer Family Trust v. Queen private securities fraud class action. He authored In re Resorts Int'l, Inc. a seminal decision regarding the scope of bankruptcy subject matter jurisdiction after a company that was in chapter 11 emerges from bankruptcy. Scirica wrote the opinion for the unanimous Third Circuit panel affirming, for the most part, the convictions of Bill Baroni and Bridget Kelly for their roles in the closure of Fort Lee access lanes to the George Washington Bridge for political reasons, in what came to be known as the Bridgegate scandal. The decision was reversed by a unanimous Supreme Court on appeal.

== Sources ==
- Appearances on C-SPAN

Legal offices
Preceded by John Berne Hannum	Judge of the United States District Court for the Eastern District of Pennsylvania; 1984–1987	Succeeded by Lowell A. Reed Jr.
Preceded by Ruggero J. Aldisert	Judge of the United States Court of Appeals for the Third Circuit; 1987–2013	Succeeded by L. Felipe Restrepo
Preceded by Edward R. Becker	Chief Judge of the United States Court of Appeals for the Third Circuit; 2003–2010	Succeeded by Theodore McKee
