= Lois Sherman Hagarty =

American politician

Member of the Pennsylvania House of Representatives from the 148th district
- In office 1980–1992
- Preceded by: Anthony Joseph Scirica
- Succeeded by: Lita Indzel Cohen

Personal details
- Born: September 28, 1948 (age 78) Philadelphia, Pennsylvania
- Party: Republican

Lois Sherman Hagarty (born September 28, 1948) is a former Republican member of the Pennsylvania House of Representatives. She was first elected on March 11, 1980. Since 2003, Hagarty has been a principal at State Street Advisors, a lobbying and political consulting firm based in Philadelphia and Harrisburg, Pennsylvania.
