= Chad F. Kenney =

American judge (born 1955)

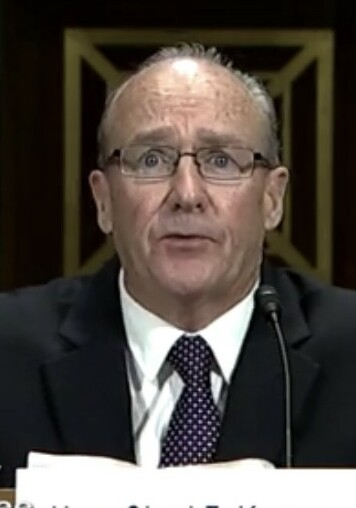

Judge of the United States District Court for the Eastern District of Pennsylvania
- Incumbent
- Assumed office October 24, 2018
- Appointed by: Donald Trump
- Preceded by: L. Felipe Restrepo

President Judge of the Delaware County Pennsylvania Court of Common Pleas
- In office June 2012 – June 2017
- Preceded by: Joseph Cronin
- Succeeded by: Kevin F. Kelly

Judge of the Delaware County Pennsylvania Court of Common Pleas
- In office August 22, 2003 – October 24, 2018
- Appointed by: Ed Rendell

Sheriff of Delaware County, Pennsylvania
- In office 1998–2003
- Preceded by: Ann A. Osborne
- Succeeded by: Joseph F. McGinn

Personal details
- Born: Chad Francis Kenney Sr. August 8, 1955 (age 71) Lower Merion, Pennsylvania, U.S.
- Party: Republican
- Education: Villanova University (BA); Temple University (JD)

Chad Francis Kenney Sr. (born August 8, 1955) is a United States district judge of the United States District Court for the Eastern District of Pennsylvania. He was previously a Judge of the Delaware County Court of Common Pleas.

== Biography ==
Kenney earned his Bachelor of Arts, cum laude, from Villanova University and his Juris Doctor from the Temple University Beasley School of Law where he was a member of the Temple Law Review.

He began his legal career in 1980 as a civil litigator and later entered general practice. From 1981 to 1983, he was a central legal staff lawyer for the Superior Court of Pennsylvania. He practiced in Delaware County and Philadelphia as an associate, partner, and a sole practitioner, in both large and small firms. Prior to his election to the bench, Kenney was elected twice as Delaware County Sheriff. From 1996 to 2003, he served as a Pennsylvania State Republican Committee member. From 2003 to 2018, he served as a Judge of the Delaware County Court of Common Pleas. During his time on the state bench, Kenney presided over cases in the family, criminal, civil, and orphans' sections. In 2012, his judicial colleagues elected him to serve a five-year term as the President Judge. He stepped down in 2017 after his term ended.

== Federal judicial service ==
On December 20, 2017, President Donald Trump nominated Kenney to serve as a United States District Judge of the United States District Court for the Eastern District of Pennsylvania, to the seat vacated by Judge L. Felipe Restrepo, who was elevated to the United States Court of Appeals for the Third Circuit on January 13, 2016. On May 9, 2018, a hearing on his nomination was held before the Senate Judiciary Committee. On June 7, 2018, his nomination was reported out of committee by voice vote. On October 11, 2018, his nomination was confirmed by voice vote. He received his judicial commission on October 24, 2018.

== Notable cases ==
- In March 2019, Kenney dismissed a class action lawsuit against a landfill in Bethlehem, Pennsylvania, ruling that "residents didn't provide any arguments to prove that Bethlehem Landfill Co. has an obligation to protect neighboring landowners from bad smells or other nuisance conditions."
- In May 2019, Kenney awarded $33,000 in damages under the Telephone Consumer Protection Act (TCPA) for violating do-not-call requests. The plaintiff, James Everett Shelton, regularly brings lawsuits alleging violations of the TCPA, which allows $500 - $1500 in damages per call.
- In June 2019, Kenney denied a request by a Pennsylvania abortion clinic to ban a man engaged in sidewalk counseling from the street outside the clinic "while the court determines if he and another demonstrator have violated a federal law against impeding access to reproductive health care." The abortion clinic and the demonstrators eventually reached a settlement agreement.
- In March 2022, Kenney ruled a provision in the Pennsylvania Rules of Professional Conduct which barred attorneys from engaging in harassment and discrimination as unconstitutional and prohibited on First Amendment free speech grounds.

Political offices
Preceded by Ann A. Osborne	Sheriff of Delaware County; 1998–2003	Succeeded by Joseph F. McGinn
Legal offices
Preceded by Joseph Cronin	President Judge of the Court of Common Pleas for Delaware County; 2012–2017	Succeeded by Kevin F. Kelly
Preceded by L. Felipe Restrepo	Judge of the United States District Court for the Eastern District of Pennsylvania; 2018–present	Incumbent
