= L. Felipe Restrepo =

American judge (born 1959)

Felipe Restrepo
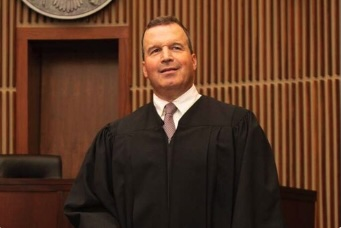

Vice Chair of the United States Sentencing Commission
- Incumbent
- Assumed office August 5, 2022
- Appointed by: Joe Biden
- Preceded by: Ketanji Brown Jackson

Judge of the United States Court of Appeals for the Third Circuit
- Incumbent
- Assumed office January 13, 2016
- Appointed by: Barack Obama
- Preceded by: Anthony Joseph Scirica

Judge of the United States District Court for the Eastern District of Pennsylvania
- In office June 19, 2013 – January 13, 2016
- Appointed by: Barack Obama
- Preceded by: Anita B. Brody
- Succeeded by: Chad F. Kenney

Personal details
- Born: Luis Felipe Restrepo; 1959 (age 66–67) Medellín, Colombia
- Education: University of Pennsylvania (BA); Tulane University (JD)

Luis Felipe Restrepo, known commonly as L. Felipe Restrepo, is a United States Court of Appeals Judge for the Third Circuit and a former United States District Court Judge for the Eastern District of Pennsylvania. He is also a member of the United States Sentencing Commission, where he currently serves as Vice Chair.

== Biography ==
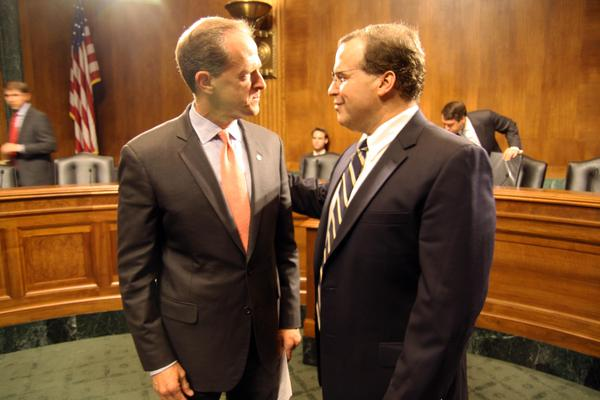
Judge Restrepo and Senator Toomey at Judge Restrepo's Senate Judiciary Hearing

Judge Restrepo has served as a United States Court of Appeals Judge for the Third Circuit since 2016. Judge Restrepo previously served as a United States District Court Judge for the Eastern District of Pennsylvania from 2013 to 2016, and as a United States Magistrate Judge for the Eastern District of Pennsylvania from 2006 to 2013, where he presided over a variety of criminal and civil matters. He was a partner at the Philadelphia law firm of Krasner & Restrepo (with current Philadelphia District Attorney Larry Krasner) from 1993 to 2006. From 1990 to 1993, he served as an Assistant Federal Defender in the Eastern District of Pennsylvania, and from 1987 to 1990 as an Assistant Defender with the Defender Association of Philadelphia.

Judge Restrepo has served in a variety of teaching positions. Since 1993, he has been an Adjunct Professor teaching Trial Advocacy at Temple University Beasley School of Law. From 1997 to 2009, he also served as an Adjunct Professor teaching Trial Advocacy at the University of Pennsylvania Law School.

Judge Restrepo received his B.A. from the University of Pennsylvania in 1981 and his J.D. from Tulane Law School in 1986.

Judge Luis Felipe Restrepo was born in Medellín, Colombia, and was raised in Northern Virginia. He was sworn in as a United States Citizen on September 7, 1993.

== Federal judicial service ==
=== District court service ===
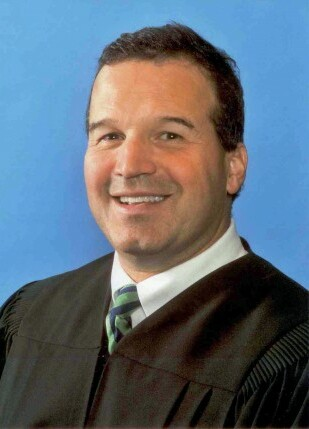
Judge Restrepo

On November 27, 2012, President Barack Obama nominated Judge Restrepo to serve as a United States District Judge of the United States District Court for the Eastern District of Pennsylvania, to the seat vacated by Judge Anita B. Brody, who assumed senior status on June 8, 2009. On January 2, 2013, his nomination was returned to the President, due to the sine die adjournment of the Senate. On January 3, 2013, Obama renominated Restrepo to the same office. The Senate confirmed his nomination on June 17, 2013, by a voice vote. He received his commission on June 19, 2013. His service as a district court judge was terminated on January 13, 2016, when he was elevated to the court of appeals.

=== Court of appeals service ===
On November 12, 2014, President Obama nominated Restrepo to serve as a United States Circuit Judge of the United States Court of Appeals for the Third Circuit, to the seat vacated by Anthony Joseph Scirica, who assumed senior status on July 1, 2013. On December 16, 2014, his nomination was returned to the President due to the sine die adjournment of the Senate. On January 7, 2015, President Obama renominated him to the same position. He received a hearing before the Senate Judiciary Committee on June 10, 2015. On July 9, 2015, his nomination was reported out of committee by a voice vote. On January 11, 2016, the United States Senate confirmed him by an 82–6 vote. Judge Restrepo was President Obama's last appellate court judge to be confirmed by the Senate. He received his commission on January 13, 2016.

== United States Sentencing Commission ==
=== Intent to nominate under Trump ===
On March 1, 2018, President Donald Trump nominated Restrepo to serve as Commissioner of the United States Sentencing Commission, a seven-member independent body that sets federal sentencing guidelines. Restrepo's nomination was sent to the United States Senate. On January 3, 2019, his nomination was returned to the President under Rule XXXI, Paragraph 6 of the United States Senate. On August 12, 2020, President Donald Trump announced his intent to renominate Restrepo to serve as a Commissioner of the United States Sentencing Commission.

=== Nomination under Biden ===
On May 11, 2022, President Joe Biden announced his intent to nominate Restrepo to serve as a member of the United States Sentencing Commission. On May 12, 2022, his nomination was sent to the Senate, he had been nominated to fill the position left vacant by Judge Ketanji Brown Jackson, whose term expired. On June 8, 2022, a hearing on his nomination was held before the Senate Judiciary Committee. On July 21, 2022, his nomination was reported out of committee by a voice vote. On August 4, 2022, the United States Senate confirmed his nomination by voice vote.

== See also ==
- List of Hispanic and Latino American jurists
- List of first minority male lawyers and judges in Pennsylvania

Legal offices
Preceded by Anita B. Brody	Judge of the United States District Court for the Eastern District of Pennsylvania; 2013–2016	Succeeded by Chad F. Kenney
Preceded by Anthony Joseph Scirica	Judge of the United States Court of Appeals for the Third Circuit; 2016–present	Incumbent
