= Carl the Collector =

2024 American-Canadian animated television series

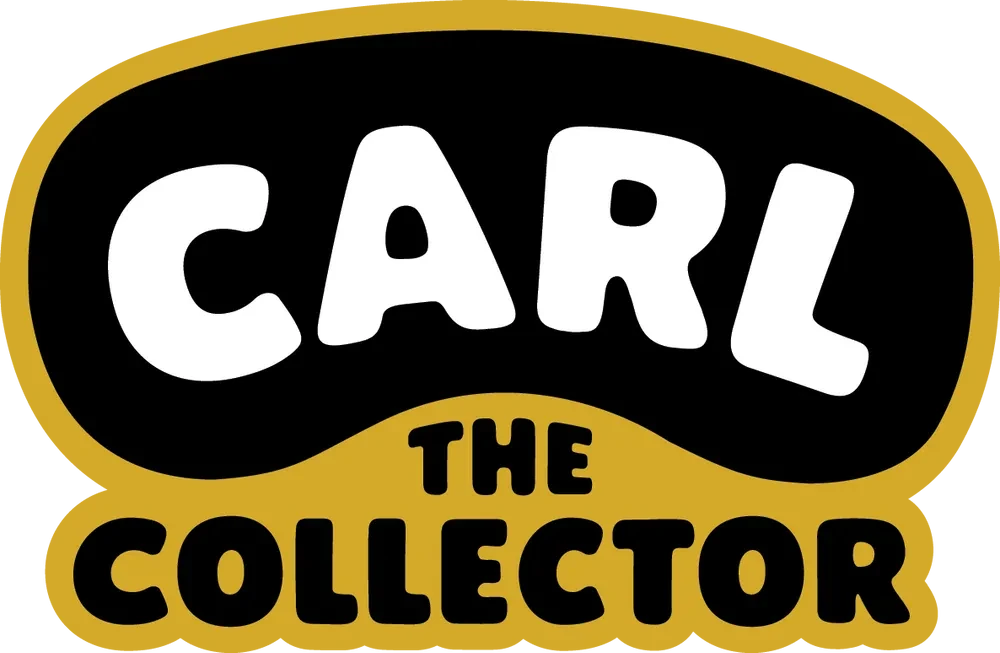
- Created by: Zachariah OHora
- Directed by: Lisa Whittick
- Voices of: Kai Barham; Peter Laurie; Abigail Oliver; Beatrice Schneider; Antonina Battrick; Maddy McIlwain
- Country of origin: United States
- No. of seasons: 1
- No. of episodes: 31 (61 segments)

Production
- Executive producer: Zachariah OHora
- Running time: 23 minutes
- Production companies: Spiffy Pictures; Yowza! Animation; Fuzzytown Productions

Original release
- Network: PBS Kids
- Release: November 14, 2024 – present

Carl the Collector (stylized in all caps) is a children's animated television series created by Zachariah OHora. It was produced by Fuzzytown Productions and Spiffy Pictures, animated by Yowza! Animation, and premiered on PBS Kids on November 14, 2024, as the network's first series to be led by autistic characters. Carl the Collector takes place in the fictional Fuzzytown and is centered around the titular character, an autistic child raccoon with a special interest in creating collections, and his friends, including Lotta, an autistic fox.

OHora is a children's author and illustrator recruited by PBS Kids for his art style around 2015. His concept for the series was influenced by his sons' school and its usage of the inclusion model. PBS Kids greenlit the series for 40 episodes to address the discrepancy between autism representation in children's programming and autism rates in the United States. To ensure authenticity, neurodivergent people were hired in a variety of occupations in the production team, the child characters were voiced by children, and the animation team worked with advisors to accurately visually convey autism.

According to Dr. Stephen Shore as of July 2026, it is currently unknown whether a second season will be produced following funding shortages at PBS, though other organizations have showed interest in sponsoring the show.

== Premise ==
Set in the fictional and peaceful Fuzzytown, Carl the Collector centers on the life of Carl, an autistic child anthropomorphic raccoon with a special interest in creating collections of various items, and his friends. Carl's friends include Sheldon, a compassionate beaver and Carl's best friend; Lotta, a shy and autistic fox with an artistic talent and hypersensitivity to sound; Forrest, a squirrel with ADHD; and Nico and Arugula, identical twin bunny sisters with opposing personalities. Episodes often involve Carl and his friends working together and learning lessons to overcome new situations.

== Cast ==
=== Main characters ===
- Kai Barham as Carl, an autistic gray raccoon with a special interest in collecting.
- Heather Bambrick as Maude (Mama), Carl's mother; Bambrick also voiced the plushies in one episode.
- Peter Laurie as Sheldon, a compassionate brown beaver and Carl's best friend.
- Abigail Oliver as Nico, an often insensitive pink rabbit and identical twin to Arugula.
- Beatrice Schneider as Arugula, a nice pink rabbit and identical twin to Nico.
- Antonina Battrick as Forrest, a hyperactive and impulsive gray squirrel with attention deficit hyperactivity disorder and a tree nut allergy.
- Maddy McIlwain as Lotta, an autistic red fox with an artistic talent.

=== Supporting characters ===
- Alli Chung as:
  - Cami, Sheldon's mother, aka Coach Mom.
  - Blue Bonnet Beverly
- Peter Cugno as:
  - Harold, Carl's father.
  - Pop Pop, Carl's grandfather and Maude's father.
- Terry McGurrin as Mr. Kelly, a teacher at school.
- Duff MacDonald as Mr. Barnaby, a lion who drives the ice cream truck and the school bus.
- Amanda Martínez as Ms. Huffman, a bear who is a librarian.
- Paulino Nunes as Fernando, Forrest's father.
- Chase Ruigrok as Mimi Toots, a hedgehog who plays the trumpet.
- Elisa Paszt as Skyler, a skunk who gave Lotta the nickname "Headphone Girl."
- Salvatore Scozzari as Mr. Howell, a wolf grocer.
- Milo Toriel-McGibbon as Dylan, a shy armadillo and new kid at Carl's school.
- Claire Poon as Brittany, Sheldon's cousin.
- Zachariah OHora as Marvin, a Yeti who runs the Pyramid Pizza restaurant.
- Claire Whittick as Lilah, Mr. Barnaby's niece and a soccer player.
- Zoe Wheatley as Marble Mabel, a dog online influencer who likes making marble runs.
- Advait Mathur as Punk Turtles, a group of musician turtles.
- Odin Frost as Paolo, a panda who uses an AAC device to communicate.
- Bruce Tubbe as Bernard, Sheldon's father and Cami's husband.
- Heather Bambrick as Ms. Doe
- Jonathan Tan as Principal Gokey
- Anthony Sardinha as Sensei Marty
- Linda Ballantyne as Gramma B, Sheldon's grandmother and Bernard's mother.
- Zoe Dahan as Willow, Sheldon's sister.
- Louisa Zhu as Evie Rand

== Episodes ==
No.	Title	Written by	Original release date	Prod. code
1	"The Autograph Collection"	Storyboarded by : Lisa Whittick; Written by : Samantha Berger and Zachariah OHora	December 4, 2024	101
1	"The Rope Collection"	Storyboarded by : Kevin Faria; Written by : Samantha Berger and Zachariah OHora	December 4, 2024	101
When Carl visits Nico and Arugula's house to ride bicycles with Arugula, Nico calls bicycle riding "for babies" and "boring," which bothers Carl. To prove Nico wrong, Carl goes to a creek with plans to jump it with his bicycle, but he ends up breaking his arm in the process. Sheldon obtains left-over wood from his father and decides to build a tree fort with Carl in Carl's backyard, inviting their friends over to help, which Carl rejects. However, Carl gets trapped in his tree fort when he fails to create a door. After being rescued, Carl and the friends decide to connect the two tree forts using a rope bridge.
2	"The Sticker Collection"	Storyboarded by : Victoria Hinatsu; Written by : Samantha Berger	November 28, 2024	102
2	"The Baby Stuff Collection"	Storyboarded by : Anthony Labonté; Written by : Samantha Berger	November 28, 2024	102
Carl's sour pickle scratch and sniff sticker, his favorite from his sticker collection, has lost its smell. Carl, Sheldon, and Forrest work together to try to bring back its smell such as by excessively scratching it and placing it in a pickle jar, causing the sticker to disintegrate. To relieve Carl's frustration, Sheldon gifts Carl his own hot butter popcorn scratch and sniff sticker. After smelling it, Carl realizes that the loss of the sour pickle sticker does not mean his entire sticker collection is ruined, placing the hot butter popcorn sticker in the spot the sour pickle sticker used to be. Lotta has a sleepover at Carl's house. While talking about items they have had since they were babies, Carl notices that his baby blanket, named Knit-Knit, has a tear in it. Carl and Lotta try to find out who the culprit is, initially to no luck. After dawn, Carl and Lotta witness a bird pulling on a thread of Knit-Knit and carrying it to its nest. Lotta recognizes the bird as a Baltimore oriole, a species of bird that create their nests to be warm before laying their eggs. Carl gives the birds his feather collection for their nest. A few weeks later, the oriole's eggs have hatched and Knit-Knit has been repaired, with Carl taking comfort in his feather collection and some of Knit-Knit being in the oriole's nest.
3	"The Plushie Collection"	Storyboarded by : Adam Massicotte; Written by : Ava X. Rigelhaupt	November 14, 2024	103
3	"The Bouncy Ball Collection"	Storyboarded by : Victoria Hinatsu; Written by : Jill Cozza-Turner	November 14, 2024	103
Carl's collection of plushies has grown to the point that he cannot reach his other collections. Carl, Sheldon, and Forrest brainstorm ideas on ways to neatly organize Carl's plushies such as placing all of them under Carl's bed, in his tree fort, and on his ceiling, none of which seem satisfactory. When Carl sees Forrest bond with his cheetah plushie, Carl decides to give away plushies he does not play with to his friends, taking a picture of each to put in a scrapbook. Afterward, Carl neatly organizes the remaining plushies in his room. Carl returns from his visit to Harold's house, where he received a sparkly bouncy ball for his collection and learned a new game named "Bounce Like the Ball". As Carl shows Sheldon his bouncy ball collection, he accidentally drops and loses the balls. Carl and his friends search the neighborhood, eventually finding all except for the sparkly ball. Though distraught over its disappearance, upon Sheldon's suggestion, Carl teaches his friends "Bounce Like the Ball". As they play the game using Carl's bouncy balls, Carl finds the sparkly ball under a bush, much to his delight.
4	"The Puffball Collection"	Storyboarded by : Victoria Hinatsu; Written by : Joey Mazzarino	December 2, 2024	104
4	"The Bottle Cap Collection"	Storyboarded by : Anthony Labonté; Written by : Joey Mazzarino	December 2, 2024	104
Lotta is nervous about competing in the Fuzzytown Music Maker Championship. Lotta's friends attend the championship to cheer her on. Lotta realizes she has forgotten her headphones, as the music and cheering in the championship triggers her hypersensitivity to sound. Her friends notice her stress but are unaware of her hypersensitivity. Using Carl's suggestions, they try to help her such as by cheering her on and providing new cans for her instrument set, but it does not work out. When Lotta tells Carl her problem, Carl makes a makeshift headphone using puffballs and two cans, allowing Lotta play in the championship. The night after returning from a weekend visit to Harold's, Carl realizes he has left behind his bottle cap collection. Unable to sleep, Carl continually interrupts Sheldon's sleep through a walkie-talkie for help, with each idea from Sheldon proving unsatisfactory to Carl. Sheldon helps Carl figure out why he feels bad about the missing bottle cap collection, with Carl realizing that he is worried about the collection's safety. Carl and Maude call Harold, who reassures Carl that he will keep the collection safe and return it in the morning.
5	"The Tool Collection"	Storyboarded by : Adam Massicotte; Written by : Samantha Berger	November 20, 2024	105
5	"The Stick Collection"	Storyboarded by : Anthony Labonté; Written by : Susan M. Clarke	November 20, 2024	105
For Carl's birthday, Sheldon gifts him a universal screwdriver. As Carl's parents set up his birthday party, Carl uses the screwdriver around the house to gather a collection of fifteen unique screws, lying to his parents to prevent them from knowing and unaware of the malfunction he is causing. When his parents catch him unscrewing the last screw from the kitchen faucet, Carl is coaxed into confessing his plan. Upon Maude's urging, Carl proceeds to put every screw back into their original place, starting with the faucet. During the party, Carl is gifted a collection containing fifteen unique screws. After a rainstorm subsides, Carl discovers a hole left behind on the walkway in front of his house, much to his distress. As Carl and Maude research how to fix it through watching how-to videos, Carl's friends play with it and the water inside, eventually creating "Stickville"; a miniature set of small boats, fishing rods, and a bridge over the hole using sticks and acorns. Realizing how fun Stickville looks, Carl changes his mind to wanting to keep the hole. Maude allows them to play with it for the day, before fixing it the next day.
6	"The Fake Mustache Collection"	Storyboarded by : Victoria Hinatsu; Written by : Joey Mazzarino	November 15, 2024	106
6	"The Lint Dinosaur Collection"	Storyboarded by : Tony Tulipano; Written by : Joey Mazzarino	November 15, 2024	106
The identical twins Nico and Arugula are often confused with each other. To prevent this from happening anymore, Nico and Carl team up to convince Arugula to regularly wear a wig or a fake mustache to distinguish between them. After failing to do so, Nico commits to wearing a fake mustache herself; afterwards, they and Carl decide to observe the differences between Nico and Arugula to prevent it from happening again. Carl and his friends meet up in the park to create lint dinosaurs for Lint Dinosaur Monday. During the meetup, Nico creates a lint monster, which makes Carl unhappy. Carl's opposition makes Nico leaves to set up her own Lint Monster Monday meetup, creating a rift between the friends. The friends eventually learn how to set boundaries during Lint Dinosaur Mondays after Carl and Nico deliberately antagonize each other.
7	"The Remote Control Collection"	Storyboarded by : Victoria Hinatsu; Written by : Joey Mazzarino	November 25, 2024	107
7	"The Super Blue Moon Sleepover"	Storyboarded by : Steve Barr; Written by : Samantha Berger	November 25, 2024	107
At a picnic, Forrest continually disrupts activities out of hyperactivity, which leads to Sheldon's buggy being wrecked and being reprimanded by Carl and Sheldon. Initially, his attempts at using coping strategies suggested by his friends fail; however, Carl suggests the following coping strategy: whenever Forrest wants to do something, he can pause and consider the consequences of doing the action in haste, motivating him to wait, which works out for Forrest. Carl has planned a sleepover in his tree fort for his friends to watch a super blue moon, a rare occurrence of a blue moon and a supermoon on the same night. Because of the event's rarity, Carl has scheduled each activity to be followed in a structured way. Consequently, Carl becomes frustrated when his friends don't follow the schedule that he set up.
8	"Lemons!"	Storyboarded by : Jeff White; Written by : Adam Rudman	November 18, 2024	108
8	"The Butterfly Collection"	Storyboarded by : Anthony Labonté; Written by : Kelly Dipucchio	November 18, 2024	108
Carl starts a lemonade stand. When Carl asks Sheldon to help him run the stand, Sheldon reveals that he is afraid of lemons, having once sustained an eye injury from one. Carl tries to help Sheldon overcome his fear, eventually giving him a pair of goggles to protect his eyes while running the stand. While serving lemonade, Carl accidentally trips and douses Sheldon in lemonade. Unscathed, Sheldon stays at the stand as Carl makes a new batch of lemonade. Carl prepares a bottle to keep his three black swallowtail butterflies after they complete their metamorphoses. He learns from a book that butterflies need nectar, which he cannot gather, and is subsequently irritated when Sheldon expresses concern about the butterflies experiencing asphyxiation in the bottle. Maude asks Carl to consider how he would feel if he was trapped in a jar and to consider his choices regarding the butterflies. When the butterflies emerge from their chrysalis, Carl decides to hold a farewell party and set the butterflies free.
9	"The Magic Trick Collection"	Storyboarded by : Victoria Hinatsu; Written by : Samantha Berger	November 27, 2024	109
9	"Listen Coach"	Storyboarded by : Steve Barr; Written by : Joey Mazzarino	November 27, 2024	109
Arugula becomes the assistant to both Carl and Nico as they independently start practicing stage magic, exhausting Arugula and causing conflict between Carl and Nico. A competition is hosted between the two, with Arugula assisting both at the same time. When Arugula goes missing during the final magic trick, Carl and Nico team up to search for her. She is found home, having fled the competition and swearing off stage magic. Upon Arugula's suggestion, Carl and Nico become partners in magic. Carl is distracted by his megaphone collection and is repeatedly told that he is not listening to others, frustrating him. After telling Sheldon, Carl realizes his difficulty in listening to others when distracted. Sheldon coaches Carl on listening, assisted by his mother and his cousin Brittany. Afterward, Carl demonstrates his listening skills with Arugula and Forrest, both of whom he had ignored previously.
10	"A Collection to Get Rid Of"	Storyboarded by : Jeff White; Written by : Monique Moreau and Adam Rudman	December 5, 2024	110
10	"The Button Collection"	Storyboarded by : Anthony Labonté; Written by : Susan M. Clarke	December 5, 2024	110
A music festival the prior day leaves litter in the park, interfering with recreational activities there. Carl and his friends decide to clean up the park. During the process, Forrest treats the cleanup like a contest, Carl becomes fascinated with recycling and upcycling and sorts the trash accordingly, and other residents of Fuzzytown offer to help. After the cleanup is finished, Forrest declares himself the winner, before looking at the clean park and deciding to acknowledge his friends' contributions, giving them golden bottle caps found during the cleanup. For the birthday of Sheldon's mother, Sheldon wants to give her a mug made by Maude. To keep it a surprise, Carl agrees to take the mug home until Sheldon visits to retrieve it. While entering his house, Carl accidentally drops and breaks the mug. Carl blames himself, declaring himself a bad friend for his mistake. Although distraught upon being told, Sheldon points out that Carl's remorse makes him a good friend. Heartened by Sheldon's words, Carl helps Sheldon turn the pieces into a mosaic tray to give to Sheldon's mother, contributing yellow buttons from his button collection.
11	"A Forrest of Plans"	Storyboarded by : Steve Barr; Written by : Liz Hara	November 26, 2024	111
11	"The Marble Collection"	Storyboarded by : Victoria Hinatsu; Written by : Jill Cozza-Turner	November 26, 2024	111
Forrest makes plans with his friends, including constructing a racetrack with Carl, eating pizza with Nico and Arugula, and playing instruments with Lotta. This leads to each friend becoming frustrated and eventually abandoning their activities. On a hot summer day, Carl and Arugula build a marble run together. Frustrated at their frequent failed attempts at building one, they decide to instead join Forrest at his water slide. After Forrest reveals that he had successfully built the water slide by learning from his own failed attempts, Carl and Arugula return to continue building their marble run, eventually succeeding in building a functional one that they show Forrest.
12	"A Wiggle Waggle Worries"	Storyboarded by : Jeff White; Written by : Joey Mazzarino	December 3, 2024	112
12	"The Pine Cone Collection"	Storyboarded by : Anthony Labonté; Written by : Kelly DiPucchio	December 3, 2024	112
Sheldon invites Carl to a beach sport with their friends, which he reluctantly attends despite his general dislike of sports. Upon finding out that it involves hitting a beach ball with their tails, Carl, insecure about his own tail, attempts to leave the game several times by claiming he is collecting various beach items. His friends catch on and, upon learning about his insecurity, comfort him and convince him to continue playing the game. During their round, Carl discovers that he can use the tail to spin the ball while hitting it, much to everyone's delight. Lotta has lost her blanket on her and her friends' way to a soccer game but initially downplays her worries. While her friends celebrate Forrest's victory in the soccer game at Pizza Pyramid, Lotta starts crying and confesses that she is worried her blanket will never be found. The friends retrace their path to the soccer game and find Lotta's blanket in a tree, which Forrest knocks off by hitting it with a soccer ball. Lotta thanks her friends and apologizes for not confessing her feelings sooner.
13	"The Fall"	Storyboarded by : Victoria Hinatsu; Written by : Ava X. Rigelhaupt	November 21, 2024	113
13	"The Word Collection"	Storyboarded by : Steve Barr; Written by : Bob Shea	November 21, 2024	113
Carl, Nico, and Arugula are flying kites at the park, during which Nico trips and scrapes her knee. Carl takes no action and consequently irritates Nico. Carl talks about his predicament with his mother Maude, who suggests that Carl's uncertainty was due to his autism. Afterwards, he apologies to Nico, disclosing that he has autism. While at a street fare parade with Harold, Carl learns a new word: shindig, which Harold defines as a "joyful party or celebration" and consisting of a crowd, music, and food. It inspires Carl to do a shindig of his own.
14	"Whole Lotta Lotta"	Storyboarded by : Jeff White; Written by : Joey Mazzarino	November 19, 2024	114
14	"Leaf It to Carl"	Storyboarded by : Anthony Labonté; Written by : Corey Womack	November 19, 2024	114
Lotta is bothered due to being called "Headphone Girl" by Skyler, a popular girl at her after-school club, who appear to only know Lotta for wearing headphones. Carl reveals that when he was known primarily as "The Autistic Kid" back at school, he created the "Carl collection", consisting of items that represent different interests of Carl for others to know him, and helps Lotta make a similar collection for her. As she gathers her items for the collection, Lotta decides to include a rainbow-colored model brain, personally disclosing to Carl that she is autistic as well. The next day, Lotta and Skyler bond over the items in the Lotta collection, before proceeding to play four square together. After school, Carl spots the last ginkgo leaf of the fall season, which he wants for his leaf collection, high up on a tree. However, at the base is the new armadillo student Dylan drawing on his notepad, who Carl and his friends are uncertain about due to an incident at school and rumors told by Nico. They attempt to retrieve the leaf without Dylan noticing, though Dylan eventually retreats home in fear. When Carl and Lotta visit, Dylan reveals that he wanted to hang out with them and was nervous due to being in a bigger school. Carl retrieves the gingko leaf as Dylan teaches his friends how to roll.
15	"Rhythm Blues"	Storyboarded by : Steve Barr; Written by : Susan M. Clarke	March 31, 2025	115
15	"Giving Up the Ship"	Storyboarded by : Victoria Hinatsu; Written by : Joey Mazzarino	March 31, 2025	115
Lotta encounters Nico and Arugula in the park dancing to the electronic song "Everybody Dah Dee Dah". Lotta struggles to learn their dance due to her perceiving music as colors. After encountering Carl, who is measuring the location of flowerbeds to help Sheldon and Forrest water them while avoiding the smell of flowers, Lotta realizes she prefers performing and making music over dancing to them, with Nico and Arugula reflecting that their differing interests are what distinguishes them and allows them to engage in activities in different ways. Sheldon and Carl have role-played as Popcorn Pirates since preschool. One day, Arugula and Forrest are invited to join Carl and Sheldon. Sheldon discloses to Arugula and Forrest that he has lost interest in role-playing as Popcorn Pirates, feigning his interest in front of Carl upon seeing his enthusiasm. As they play, Sheldon struggles to maintain his façade and eventually quits. Carl becomes despaired, worried that Sheldon will stop liking him and his activities. Sheldon reassures him that they are still best friends and can find new activities. After Sheldon rejoins their play, they find a model of a Viking ship, built by Sheldon's Aunt Judy, inspiring Carl and Sheldon's newfound interest in making model ships.
16	"The Artifact Collection"	Storyboarded by : Anthony Labonté; Written by : Kelly Dipucchio	April 3, 2025	116
16	"Mothership Day"	Storyboarded by : Jeff White; Written by : Jill Cozza-Turner	April 3, 2025	116
After being introduced to archaeology at school, Arugula decides to find artifacts outside. While practicing a melody on a theremin for Mother's Day, Carl sees a mysterious item hovering in the neighborhood.
17	"The Lost Yo-Yo"	Storyboarded by : Steve Barr; Written by : Liz Hara	April 4, 2025	117
17	"Rainy Day"	Storyboarded by : Victoria Hinatsu; Written by : Ava X. Rigelhaupt	April 4, 2025	117
Carl has lost one of his yo-yos, and his friends are determined to find it. Carl wants to have a pool party with his buddies, but rain prevents it from happening.
18	"Twin Sister Hamster Sitters Incorporated"	Storyboarded by : Jeff White; Written by : Joey Mazzarino	April 1, 2025	118
18	"The Sneaker Collection"	Storyboarded by : Victoria Hinatsu; Written by : Susan M. Clarke	April 1, 2025	118
Nico and Arugula start a daycare business for hamsters. When Carl's shoes start to wear out, Maude takes him to the shoe store to get a new pair. However, when the pair of shoes he receives are too tight, Carl doesn't express his discomfort due to the overwhelming nature of the store.
19	"The Gratitude Collection"	Storyboarded by : Anthony Labonté; Written by : Samantha Berger	April 2, 2025	119
19	"The Pet Rock Collection"	Storyboarded by : Steve Barr; Written by : Renae Ruddock	April 2, 2025	119
Carl and Sheldon go on a thank-you mission that ends up causing a traffic jam. Carl shows his friends the right way to play with pet rocks, but his friends have other ideas.
20	"The Potato Collection"	Storyboarded by : Anthony Labonté; Written by : Bob Shea	October 14, 2025	120
20	"Nico and the Nutty Buddies"	Storyboarded by : Jeff White; Written by : Joey Mazzarino	October 14, 2025	120
For school spirit week, Carl has an idea to use potatoes to resemble the school staff. Forrest shares his idea for school spirit week, but Carl rejects the idea, leaving Forrest unhappy. Initially refusing to listen to Carl, Forrest and Carl eventually combine ideas, with Carl using the potato to power up the helmet Forrest was using as a part of his trick. When the Junior Nutty Buddy Nut Lovers' Club starts accepting new members, Nico wants to join and has Forrest come to help put a good word for her. Unfortunately, the club ends up excluding and antagonizing the friends, especially Forrest, where Nutty Buddy Numero Uno denies the fact that Forrest is both a squirrel and is allergic to nuts.
21	"The Green Piece"	Storyboarded by : Steve Barr; Written by : Liz Hara	October 15, 2025	121
21	"The FuzzyWorld Book of Records"	Storyboarded by : Victoria Hinatsu; Written by : Samantha Berger	October 15, 2025	121
When Dylan is riding on his scooter, Carl, Nico, and Arugula invite him to play board games with them; he brings in his game "Roll Roll Armadillo." However, Dylan grows frustrated when he loses the marble pieces for his game; his anger boils over when his friends suggest calming techniques that do not work for Dylan. Carl tries to get the pieces back but ends up dropping the paintbrush and knocks the pieces away, to which Dylan recognizes the mistake and plays outside by using the beads from the scooter as replacements. Carl returns home from Harold's place with a book of the FuzzyWorld Book of Records; he wants to be in it by beating the record for the most cards to build the Pizza Pyramid house. After building the first tower, Carl calls his parents to come up to check his progress, but accidentally knocks the cards down. After several subsequent failed attempts, Carl's friend Sheldon and Carl's parents explain to him about failure being a learning process.
22	"The Crayonverters Collection"	Storyboarded by : Anthony Labonté; Written by : Joey Mazzarino	March 30, 2026	122
22	"Lotta's New Instrument"	Storyboarded by : Jeff White; Written by : Corey Womack	March 30, 2026	122
Carl and Nico become annoyed at each other when Carl's high-tech coloring tool gets messed up and Nico's drawing gets ripped. When Lotta is unable to play an alto saxophone her grandmother gifted her, she considers mailing it back.
23	"The Meltdown"	Storyboarded by : Steve Barr; Written by : Kelly Dipucchio	March 31, 2026	123
23	"Carl's Cast"	Storyboarded by : Victoria Hinatsu; Written by : Samantha Berger	March 31, 2026	123
Carl is fixated on an upcoming ice cream festival, which ends up in him becoming increasingly cranky and exhausted. Because his arm is in a cast, as a result of his mishap in The Autograph Collection, Carl is unhappy over the number of things he cannot do.
24	"The Sweater Collection"	Storyboarded by : Anthony Labonté; Written by : Crystal Villarreal	April 1, 2026	124
24	"New Bus Stop"	Storyboarded by : Jeff White; Written by : Ava X. Rigelhaupt	April 1, 2026	124
Carl learns the importance of honesty and kindness. Sheldon and Lotta help Carl navigate his way to the new stop of his school bus.
25	"Show and Smell"	Storyboarded by : Steve Barr; Written by : Susan M. Clarke	April 2, 2026	125
25	"The Campfire Conundrum"	Storyboarded by : Victoria Hinatsu; Written by : Corey Womack	April 2, 2026	125
Carl takes Sheldon and Lotta on a tour of what he believes are the best smells of town. When Dylan tells a scary made-up story during a camp out, everybody is entertained, except Carl.
26	"The Karate Belt Collection"	Storyboarded by : Anthony Labonté; Written by : Joey Mazzarino	September 1, 2026	126
26	"Sprout Watch"	Storyboarded by : Jeff White; Written by : Renae J. Ruddock	September 1, 2026	126
Carl is overconfident that he knows the moves to earn his second belt, so skips practice, and spends the night modifying his karate uniform to hold all the belts he aims to collect. When a cucumber seed he sowed is taking longer sprout, Carl decides to constantly watch it until it does.
27	"The Square Dance"	Storyboarded by : Steve Barr; Written by : Samantha Berger	September 2, 2026	127
27	"The Process"	Storyboarded by : Victoria Hinatsu; Written by : Niya Wright	September 2, 2026	127
Dylan is uncomfortable when it comes to square dance moves that involve partners touching each other. Nico’s dream of being able to ride a bike gets a chance to come true, but will she accept Carl’s multi-step but effective training system?
28	"The Bark Banquet"	Storyboarded by : Jeff White; Written by : Jill Cozza-Turner	September 3, 2026	128
28	"Carl's Collection of To-Dos"	Storyboarded by : Victoria Hinatsu; Written by : Ty Freedman	September 3, 2026	128
Sheldon invites Carl to his family party where members sing, dance, and eat mostly bark. Carl is on a tight schedule making preparations for Forrest’s birthday party.
29	"A New Friend"	Storyboarded by : Adam Massicotte; Written by : Kelly DiPucchio	October 13, 2025	135
29	"Lotta the Copycat"	Storyboarded by : Steve Barr; Written by : Crystal Villarreal	October 13, 2025	135
While Carl and Harold are at a convenience store, Carl befriends a panda called Paolo, who uses an AAC device to communicate. He shows Carl how it works, reveals that he lives in the building and his parents own the store, and like Carl, he loves collecting stickers and bouncy balls. The next day, Carl wonders why Paolo uses a device to speak and if Paolo could be autistic just like him. Later, one of the kids didn't want to let Paolo play because he can't speak, and Carl recalls when he got excluded for being autistic until Sheldon and Arugula invite him to play. He defends Paolo, pointing out that he communicates with his tablet. After Paolo tells Carl he didn't want his tablet to get wet, he gives himself and Paolo an umbrella to play ball until it rains. While Lotta sketches a portrait of Nico and Arugula, she recalls when she first met them, which makes Lotta uncomfortable. Seeing how confident Nico is, Lotta copies what Nico does, which embarrasses Nico.
30	"A Fuzzytown Halloween"	Storyboarded by : Steve Barr and Adam Massicotte; Written by : Joey Mazzarino	October 16, 2025	138
31	"Lotta and the Watch Party"	Storyboarded by : Jeff White; Written by : Ty Freedman	August 31, 2026	140
31	"Yes Chefs!"	Storyboarded by : Anthony Labonté; Written by : Dr. Kerry Magro and Adam Rudman	August 31, 2026	140
Skyler invites Lotta to a TV party at her home, but Lotta has a resting routing, and is hesitant to tell her about it. Lotta and Forrest are partners at a school cook-off.

== Production ==
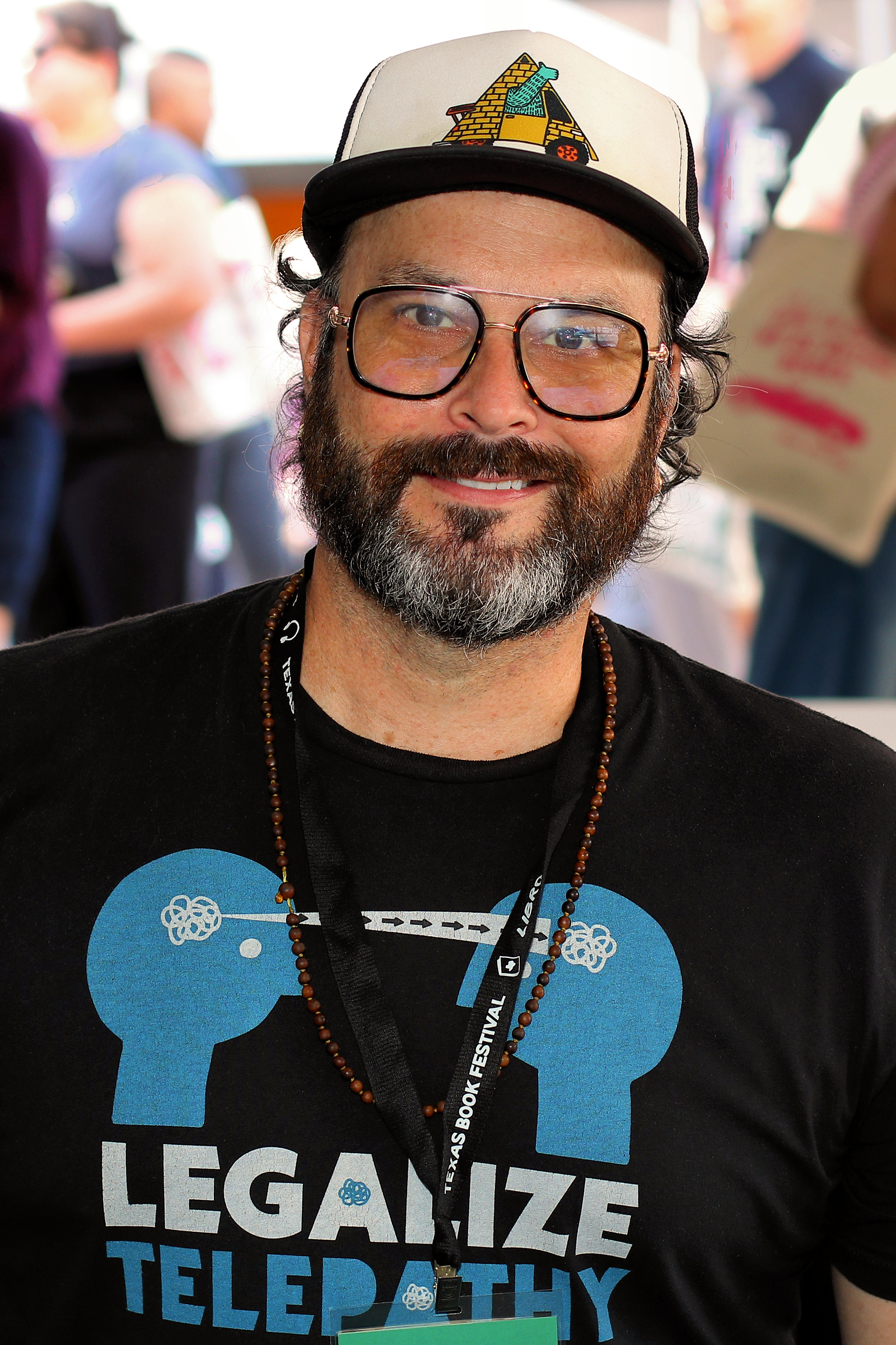
Zachariah OHora, creator of the series, at the 2025 Texas Book Festival in Austin, Texas.

Zachariah OHora is a commercially successful children's author and illustrator based in Philadelphia, known for his picture books featuring bipedal animals such as Wolfie the Bunny, Niblet & Ralph, and My Cousin Momo. In c. 2015, during a time when PBS Kids was searching for "creators outside its usual pool of talent", Natalie Engel, the Director of Content for Children's Programming, approached OHora, liking his art style, to create a television series. At the time, OHora had created a raccoon character called "The Collector", based on OHora's own collecting habits, who had not been used in any of OHora's stories at the time. OHora's concept for the series was inspired by a school that his two non-autistic sons went to and that centered around the inclusion model. OHora described his experiences with the school as a "lightbulb moment"; he felt what he perceived as stigma surrounding disabilities would diminish if children were exposed to the "spectrum of humanity".

According to OHora, "it took a while to get the concept completely right and fleshed out"; he cited his occupation as a writer and believing the series' creation was not guaranteed. PBS Kids would later greenlight Carl the Collector for 40 episodes, half of which were completed by November 2024, with OHora serving as executive producer. Fuzzytown, the fictional setting of Carl the Collector, is modeled after Narberth, Pennsylvania, the residence of the show's creator. Carl the Collector was produced by Fuzzytown Productions and Spiffy Pictures, both of which hired neurodivergent people in a variety of occupations for the production team. The child characters are portrayed by child actors. Both autistic characters, Carl and Lotta, are portrayed by autistic child actors; Kai Barham and Maddy McIlwain, respectively. Yowza! Animation produced the pilot and later animated the series, replicating OHora's art style and using the Toon Boom programs Harmony and Storyboard Pro.

Though Carl was not the first autistic character featured in children's programming, being predated by Julia in PBS Kids' Sesame Street for example, autistic representation in children's programming is nonetheless rare compared to autism rates in the United States. According to Senior Vice President Sara DeWitt, PBS Kids sought to "fill a gap" in this autistic representation, and OHora and series director Lisa Whittick wanted to continue the legacy of autistic characters in children's programming. Lotta was written in addition to Carl to reflect the autism spectrum. Many specific details about Carl were figured out in the animation process such as his stimming. According to Whittick, her team created animation cycles of stimming and sent them to PBS Kids and advisors for feedback. To make interactions in the series feel natural, the pacing was deliberately slowed down, with influence from Charlie Brown cartoons, and voice-acted lines were often kept unedited. "The Fall", in which Carl discloses his autism to his friends, was written for viewers to learn the reasons behind Carl's mannerisms, according to writer Ava Xiao-Lin Rigelhaupt.

== Broadcast and reception ==
Carl the Collector was first announced on November 2023 as the first PBS Kids series to be led by an autistic character. Targeted toward children ages 4–8, Carl the Collector premiered on November 14, 2024, on PBS Kids. Heather Bambrick, voice actress of Maude, has expressed hope for a second season, saying she thinks "we need a show like this." On Common Sense Media, Ashley Moulton gave Carl the Collector four stars, commending the series' characterization and sensitivity in handling autism. Moulton described the characters as relatable and praised the series' representation of the autism spectrum by demonstrating how the characters of Carl and Lotta experience autism differently and how autistic traits manifest without othering the characters. Carrie Gillispie of New America considered the character of Carl "a hopeful sign that perhaps disability inclusion could become the norm for the next generation".
