= Anita B. Brody =

American judge (born 1935)

Anita Blumstein Brody

Senior Judge of the United States District Court for the Eastern District of Pennsylvania
- Incumbent
- Assumed office June 8, 2009

Judge of the United States District Court for the Eastern District of Pennsylvania
- In office October 2, 1992 – June 8, 2009
- Appointed by: George H. W. Bush
- Preceded by: Seat established by 104 Stat. 5089
- Succeeded by: L. Felipe Restrepo

Personal details
- Born: Anita Jane Blumstein; May 25, 1935 (age 90) Brooklyn, New York
- Education: Wellesley College (BA); Columbia Law School (JD)

Anita Jane Brody (née Blumstein; born May 25, 1935), also known as Anita Blumstein Brody, is a senior United States district judge of the United States District Court for the Eastern District of Pennsylvania.

== Education and career ==
Brody was born in Brooklyn, New York. She earned a Bachelor of Arts degree from Wellesley College in 1955, and a Juris Doctor from Columbia Law School in 1958. Brody was a deputy assistant state attorney general in New York from 1958 to 1959. From 1973 to 1981, she was in private practice in Philadelphia. In 1981, Brody was appointed by Pennsylvania Governor Richard Thornburgh, and then elected a Judge of the Court of Common Pleas for Montgomery County, Pennsylvania, which is part of the Philadelphia Metropolitan Area. In 1989, she was the Republican nominee for a seat on the Pennsylvania Supreme Court, but was defeated by Democrat Ralph Cappy.

== Federal judicial service ==
Brody was nominated by President George H. W. Bush on November 22, 1991, to the United States District Court for the Eastern District of Pennsylvania, to a new seat created as a result of the passage of 104 Stat. 5089. She was confirmed by the United States Senate on September 2, 1992, and received her commission on October 2, 1992.

== Notable cases ==
Brody presided over the case to decide whether a group of lawsuits by former NFL players against the NFL would be heard in federal court or whether the cases would be heard by an arbitrator in accordance with the league's collective bargaining agreement, as the league has requested. In an April 9, 2013 hearing, the NFL's lawyer, Paul Clement, admitted it would be difficult for the NFL to make the argument that an arbitrator should hear the cases of former players who never signed the collective bargaining agreement. The medical condition chronic traumatic encephalopathy (sometimes referred to simply as CTE) resulting from concussions is a factor in the suits.

In June 2024, Brody presided over a case regarding the SS United States Conservancy and its Pier 82 landlord, Penn Warehousing. The landlord had continued to up the rent of the conservancy keeping United States at her berth. Brody ruled that Penn Warehousing did not break any contract rules, and that United States would have to find a new home within ninety days. The conservancy also has to raise funds for insurance, repairs, tugs, surveys, and preparations for the move.

== Sources ==
Legal offices
Preceded by Seat established by 104 Stat. 5089	Judge of the United States District Court for the Eastern District of Pennsylvania; 1992–2009	Succeeded by L. Felipe Restrepo
