= Melissa Murphy Weber =

American politician (born 1969)

Member of the Pennsylvania House of Representatives from the 148th district
- In office January 7, 2003 – November 30, 2004
- Preceded by: Lita Cohen
- Succeeded by: Mike Gerber

Personal details
- Born: September 26, 1969 (age 57) Scotch Plains, New Jersey
- Party: Republican
- Education: Denison University (BA); Widener University (JD); Temple University (LLM)
- Occupation: Attorney

Melissa Murphy Weber (born September 26, 1969) is an American attorney and Pennsylvania politician.

Weber graduated from Archbishop Carroll High School in 1987. She graduated with a degree in economics from Denison University in 1991. While attending Denison University, Weber achieved All-American honors in lacrosse. She received her LL.M. in Trial Advocacy from Temple University School of Law graduating with Honors in 2002; and a J.D. from Widener University School of Law. Weber served as an Assistant District Attorney in Montgomery County from 1996 to 2002.

She was first elected to represent the 148th legislative district in the Pennsylvania House of Representatives in the 2002 election. In 2003, the political website PoliticsPA named her to "The Best of the Freshman Class" list, saying that she "has all the qualities of a rising star." She was narrowly defeated for re-election by Mike Gerber in 2004.

After leaving the state legislature, Weber joined the Elliott Greenleaf law firm. In 2007, she entered the race for Montgomery County Commissioner, running with Bruce Castor. She withdrew from the race when she lost the Montgomery County Republican Committee endorsement to Jim Matthews.

In 2011 Weber was endorsed by the Whitpain Township Republican Committee to serve as Whitpain Township Supervisor. In the Primary Election Weber defeated the 4 term incumbent Brian Young winning 71.54% of the vote. Weber defeated Patricia Lorenzo, a write-in candidate, in the general election with Weber receiving 96.49%. Weber was sworn into a six-year term on January 3, 2012.

Pennsylvania House of Representatives
Preceded by Lita Cohen	Member of the Pennsylvania House of Representatives from the 148th district 2003–2004	Succeeded by Mike Gerber
