= Niblet & Ralph =

Niblet & Ralph is a 2018 children's book by Zachariah OHora, published by Dial Books.

In the book, two calico cats, Niblet and Ralph, resemble one another. Each lives with a different child: one lives with Gemma, a girl, and another lives with Dilla, a boy. The two cats try to visit one another but inadvertently switch houses. The owners realize that the respective cats are not theirs, go looking for their actual cats, and run into one another. The cats are restored to the correct houses.

The artwork uses acrylic paints.

Publishers Weekly wrote that the author "is in top form" in regards to making this book.

Kirkus Reviews stated that the plot is "endearing" and the visuals "bright and engaging".

Barbara Auerbach, who once worked for the New York City Department of Education, wrote in a review that the book has "whimsical" elements and that the artwork "adeptly capture[s] city apartment life".

== See also ==
- Carl the Collector
- My Cousin Momo
- Wolfie the Bunny
