= Federal Retirement Thrift Investment Board =

Independent agency of the US government

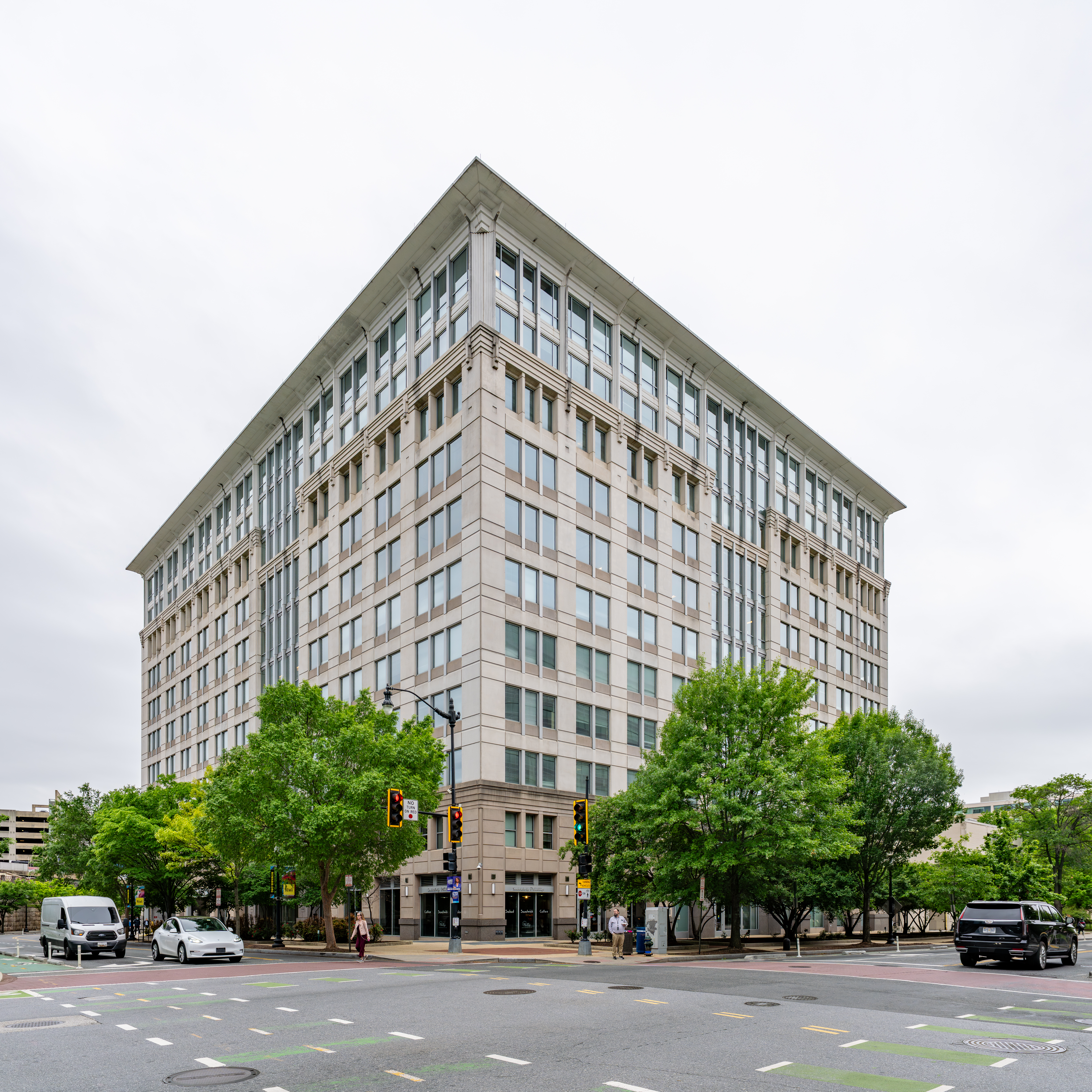
- Headquarters in Washington, D.C.

Agency overview
- Formed: 1986; 40 years ago
- Headquarters: Washington, D.C.
- Employees: 256 (December, 2016)
- Agency executives: Michael F. Gerber, Chairman; Ravindra Deo, Executive Director
- Child agency: Thrift Savings Plan
- Website: www.frtib.gov

The Federal Retirement Thrift Investment Board is an independent agency of the United States government by the Federal Employees Retirement System Act of 1986 (FERSA). It has roughly 270 employees. It was established to administer the Thrift Savings Plan (TSP), which is a retirement savings and investment plan for federal employees and members of the uniformed services, including the Ready Reserve. The Thrift Savings Plan is a tax-deferred defined contribution plan similar to a private sector 401(k) plan. The Thrift Savings Plan is one of the three parts of the Federal Employees Retirement System (FERS), and is the largest defined contribution plan in the world. According to the 2023 audited financial statements, the board manages $845 billion in assets on behalf of 7.0 million participants in the Plan, with approximately 4.1 million contributing through payroll deductions. The board members and its chairman are nominated by the president and confirmed by the United States Senate.

FERSA (5 U.S.C. § 8440(a)(1)) states that the Thrift Savings Fund shall be treated as a trust described in section 401(a) of the Internal Revenue Code (IRC or Code), which is exempt from taxation under section 501(a) of the Code. This status was reaffirmed in the Tax Reform Act of 1986, Section 1147 (codified at I.R.C. § 7701(j)). It is not necessary for the Plan to apply for a tax status determination letter as it is qualified by statute.

== Governance ==
Governance of the agency is carried out by a five-person, part-time board of presidential appointees and by a full-time executive director selected by those appointees. Of the five appointees, three members are appointed solely by the President without other consideration (of whom one shall be nominated as chairman), one member is appointed after considering the recommendation of the Speaker of the House (in consultation with the House Minority Leader) and the fifth member is appointed after considering the recommendation of the Senate Majority Leader (in consultation with the Senate Minority Leader). Each of these persons is required by FERSA to have "substantial experience, training, and expertise in the management of financial investments and pension benefit plans." The members serve for four year terms. The members may however serve until their successor has taken office, so the actual terms the members serve can be far longer.

The board members collectively establish the policies under which the TSP operates and furnish general oversight. The executive director carries out the policies established by the board members and otherwise acts as the full-time chief executive of the agency. The board and the executive director convene monthly in meetings open to the public to review policies, practices, and performance.

The chairman also appoints a 15-member Employee Thrift Advisory Council to provide input from the various employee, service member, and annuitant groups who have TSP investments, of which one is designated by the chairman as the council head. The 15-member board is made up of the following:

- Four members, one each representing the four largest non-Postal employee unions
- Two members, one each representing the two largest Postal employee unions, excluding rural letter carrier unions
- One member representing the largest Postal employee union representing rural letter carriers
- Two members, one each representing the two largest groups representing Postal managerial personnel
- One member representing Postal supervisors
- One member representing the interests of women in Federal civil service
- One member representing the largest group of individuals receiving annuities
- One member representing the largest group representing supervisors and managerial personnel, excluding Senior Executive Service
- One member representing the Senior Executive Service
- One member representing the uniformed services

The first chairman of the board was Roger W. Mehle, who was appointed on October 1, 1986. In 1988 he was reappointed and served continuously until January 31, 1994. President Clinton appointed James H. Atkins to replace him, and the board named Mehle the agency's executive director. Clinton named Atkins to another term in 1997, and to a third term via a recess appointment in 2000. He was succeeded by Andrew Saul, who named Gary Amelio executive director in 2002, replacing Mehle. The current executive director is Ravindra Deo, who succeeded Gregory Long in 2017. Ravindra Deo joined the FRTIB in 2015 as the Chief Investment Officer and additionally served as Acting Chief Operating Officer and Acting Executive Director during his tenure.

=== Board members ===
The current board members as of October 30, 2026:

Position	Name	Party	Took office	Term expires
Chair	Michael F. Gerber	Democratic	June 28, 2022	September 25, 2026
Member	Dana Bilyeu	Republican	June 2010	October 11, 2023
Member	Stacie Olivares	Democratic	June 2022	September 25, 2024
Member	Vacant			
Member	Vacant			

== Investments ==
Pursuant to FERSA (5 U.S.C. § 8438), Plan participants are offered five investment funds: the Government Securities Investment Fund (G Fund), the Fixed Income Index Investment Fund (F Fund), the Common Stock Index Investment Fund (C Fund), the Small Capitalization Stock Index Investment Fund (S Fund), and the International Stock Index Investment Fund (I Fund). The Agency has contracted with BlackRock and Street State Global Advisors (SSGA) to act as investment managers, custodians and securities lending agents for the F, C, S, and I Fund accounts.

The TSP Lifecycle Funds are asset allocation portfolios that use the Plan’s existing investment funds. As described in the L Funds Information Sheet on the TSP website (www.tsp.gov), the L Income Fund is designed to produce current income for participants who are already withdrawing money from their accounts. The L 2065 Fund is designed for participants who will begin withdrawing in 2063 or later. The remaining eight L Funds are designed for participants who will begin withdrawing in certain five-year time periods. For example, the L 2040 Fund is designed for participants who will begin withdrawing between 2038 and 2042. The asset allocations of these funds adjust quarterly, moving to a more conservative mix over time. These asset allocations are based on economic assumptions regarding future investment returns, inflation, economic growth, and interest rates. The asset allocations of each fund are maintained through daily rebalancing to that fund’s target allocation. With the help of an investment consultant, the Agency reviews the assumptions underlying the asset allocations regularly.

Accenture Federal Services (AFS), as part of its recordkeeping services contract, provides a Mutual Fund Window (MFW). Participants who meet certain eligibility criteria (5 Code of Federal Regulations Part 1601.52(a)(4)) may access mutual funds. Participants have the option to transfer money from the five individual investment funds to the MFW. AFS implemented and began managing the MFW June 1, 2022.

FERSA (5 U.S.C. § 8438(b)(5)(B)) states that the FRTIB ensure that any expenses charged for use of the MFW are borne solely by the participants who use the MFW. Participants that opt to participate in the MFW incur a $150 fee annually. FRTIB collected annual MFW fees of $617,850 and $401,250, for the twelve months ending December 31, 2023, and 2022, respectively. Accenture Federal Services was paid $391,250 and $254,125, for the twelve months ending December 31, 2023, and December 31, 2022, respectively, of the Plan collected annual MFW fees. The Plan retained $226,600 and $147,125, respectively, of the Plan collected annual MFW fees to offset administrative expenses and to ensure that participants using the MFW pay their share of the administrative fees charged through the TSP G, F, C, S, and I Funds. There are also MFW transaction fees charged per trade that are paid directly to AFS.

Participants may allocate any portion of their contributions among the five individual investment funds and the ten TSP Lifecycle Funds. If certain eligibility requirements and necessary fees are paid, participants may also allocate a portion of their contributions to the MFW. Also, participants may reallocate their account balances among the individual investment funds, the TSP Lifecycle Funds, and the MFW through the interfund transfer process. In order to curb frequent trading and its associated costs to all TSP participants, the Agency restricts the number of interfund transfers a participant can make per month. The first two fund transfers per calendar month are unrestricted. After that, participants may only move money out of the F, C, S, and I Funds, the TSP Lifecycle Funds, or the MFW into the G Fund.

Plan participants are immediately vested in all of their own contributions and attributable earnings. Participants are also immediately vested in any agency matching contributions and attributable earnings. In order to be vested in the agency automatic (1%) contributions, a FERS employee must have either 2 or 3 years of service and a BRS participant must have 2 years of service as described in section 5 U.S.C. § 8432(g) of FERSA. FERS and BRS employees who are not vested and who separate from the Federal Government forfeit all agency automatic contributions and attributable earnings.

Prior to June 1, 2022, the interest rate for loans was the G Fund rate at the time the loan agreement was issued. Beginning June 1, 2022, the interest rate for loans is the G Fund rate from the prior month from when the loan was requested. The rate is fixed at this level for the life of each loan. Participant loans are valued at their unpaid balances. Interest earned on loans is allocated to the participant’s account as loan payments are made to that account.

After leaving service, participants may leave their money in the TSP. If they choose to withdraw their money, their options are installment payments (monthly, quarterly, or annually), a partial distribution of a specified amount, an annuity purchase, or a total withdrawal. The distribution can combine options. Participants may choose to combine any two or all three of the available withdrawal options. Participants should refer to the booklet, Distributions, for more complete information. The Plan offers its participants various investment funds that are exposed to different types and amounts of risk, including interest rate, credit, and market risk. Except for the G Fund, which is invested in a way to avoid losses, depending upon each fund’s individual risk profile, the funds can be expected to experience volatility over time, thus affecting the fund balances from one period to the next.

The Plan’s agents, BlackRock and SSGA, follow the FASB’s Accounting Standards Codification (ASC) 820-10, which provides a comprehensive framework for measuring fair value and expands disclosures which are required about fair value measurements. Specifically, FASB ASC 820-10 sets forth a definition of fair value and establishes a hierarchy prioritizing the inputs to valuation techniques.

The Federal Retirement Thrift Investment Board has been criticized for a 2017 decision to mirror an index that invests in unaudited Chinese companies as well as companies that are sanctioned by the U.S. Despite scrutiny from the U.S. Senate, Board voted to permit continued investment in an index containing stocks of unaudited companies in the People's Republic of China. In November 2019, U.S. senators Marco Rubio and Jeanne Shaheen introduced legislation, the Taxpayers and Savers Protection Act, to force the Board to divest from unaudited Chinese companies. In May 2020, a directive from the United States Department of Labor ordered the TSP to halt a plan to invest in Chinese stocks. In 2022, a coalition was formed to push for the removal of emerging-market funds that contain companies linked to the People's Liberation Army.

Since July 2022, federal employees have the option of investing in mutual funds that have holdings in sanctioned Chinese companies.

In November 2023, the Federal Retirement Thrift Investment Board switched the index for its international fund to one that excludes investments in companies in Hong Kong and mainland China.

== See also ==
- Title 5 of the Code of Federal Regulations
- List of members of the Federal Retirement Thrift Investment Board
