= Michael F. Gerber =

American politician (born 1972)

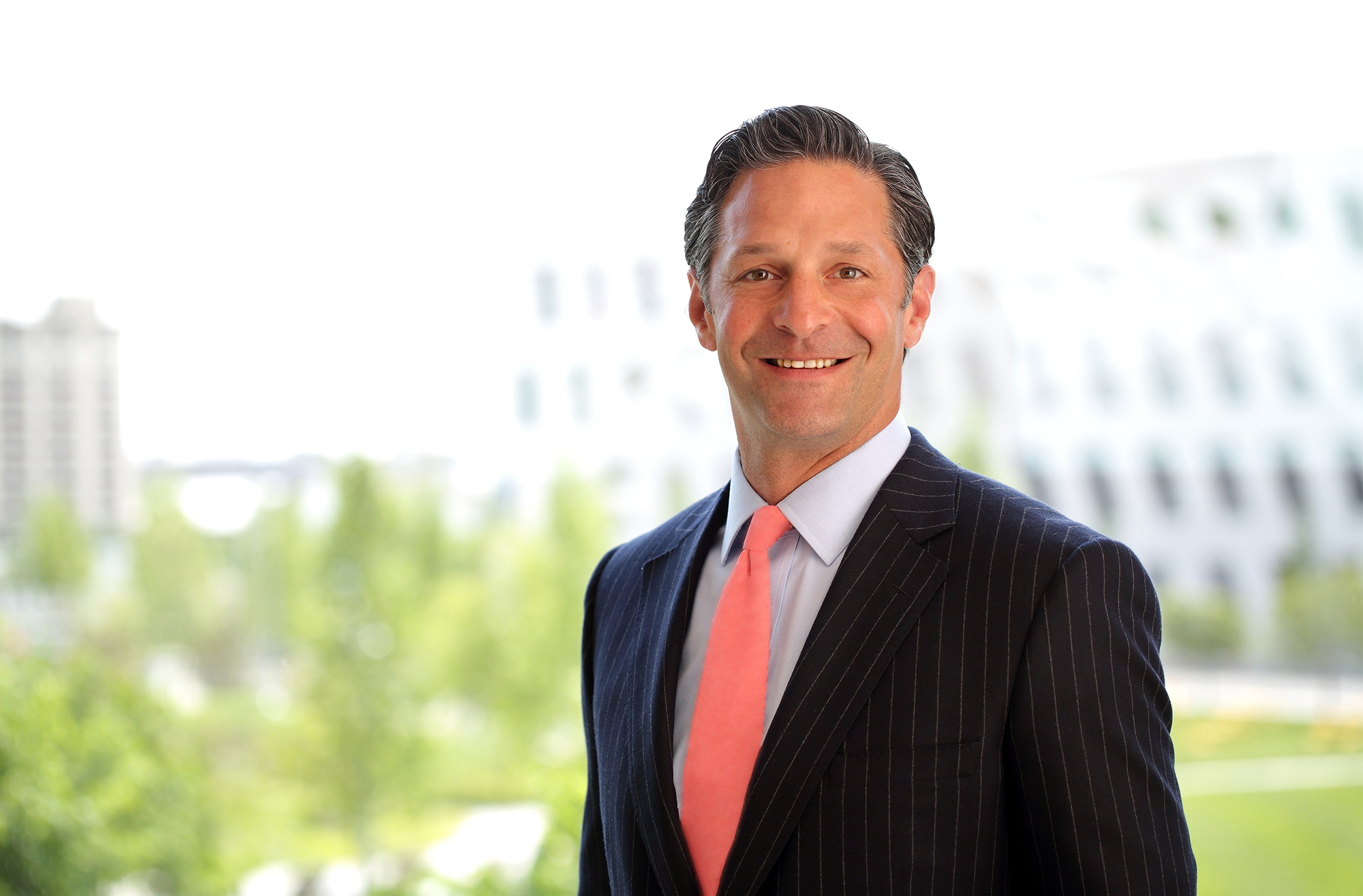

Member of the Federal Retirement Thrift Investment Board
- Incumbent
- Assumed office June 28, 2022
- President: Joe Biden; Donald Trump
- Preceded by: Michael D. Kennedy

Member of the Pennsylvania House of Representatives from the 148th district
- In office January 4, 2005 – January 1, 2013
- Preceded by: Melissa Murphy Weber
- Succeeded by: Mary Jo Daley

Personal details
- Born: May 25, 1972 (age 53) Ambler, Pennsylvania
- Party: Democratic
- Spouse: Jessica
- Education: Germantown Academy
- Alma mater: University of Pennsylvania, Villanova University School of Law
- Occupation: Attorney

Michael F. "Mike" Gerber (born May 25, 1972) is a former Democratic member of the Pennsylvania House of Representatives, representing the 148th Legislative District from 2005 to 2012. Gerber is currently a partner and chief corporate affairs officer at FS Investments. In June 2022, President Joe Biden has designated Michael F. Gerber chairman of the Federal Retirement Thrift Investment Board, Washington.

== Background ==
Mike Gerber was born in Montgomery County, Pennsylvania, to A. Richard and Penelope Gerber of Lower Gwynedd, Pennsylvania, the youngest of three children. Mike's parents were active in statewide and Montgomery County Democratic Party politics. Gerber's grandfather was Judge Morris Gerber of Montgomery County. Mike attended high school at Germantown Academy, where he played football and baseball. He then spent a year at Choate Rosemary Hall in Wallingford, Connecticut, before attending the University of Pennsylvania, where he made Dean's List and played defensive back on Penn's Ivy League champion football team. At Villanova University School of Law, Mike graduated cum laude and was recognized for donating his time to community legal service.

== Legal career ==
Prior to Gerber's election as State Representative, he worked at Center City Philadelphia law firm WolfBlock, where he concentrated on corporate litigation. At this time he was named one of the top thirty-five lawyers under the age of 40 in the Commonwealth of Pennsylvania. Gerber's legal career continued at Drinker Biddle and Reath, now called Faegre Drinker Biddle & Reath, until he joined FS Investments. Gerber served as legal counsel to Pennsylvania Governor Ed Rendell's transition team and as a law clerk to Judge Ronald L. Buckwalter of the United States District Court for the Eastern District of Pennsylvania.

== 2004 and election to State House ==
In 2004, Mike launched his first campaign for public office in Pennsylvania's 148th Legislative District. Gerber ran against incumbent Republican Melissa Murphy Weber, who had been elected in 2002 and was finishing her first term in office. In a tight race, Gerber edged out Murphy Weber by 462 votes. For much of the race, Gerber trailed significantly. However, he continued to campaign and the scale soon equalized. Pundits and analysts attribute Gerber's victory to the fact that he made efforts to connect with voters in the district, getting out and knocking on the doors of thousands of residents. Additionally, Gerber was born and raised in Montgomery County and knew the area well. This allowed him to quickly establish deeply personal relationships with voters in the district.

Gerber campaigned on several key principles, the most important of which was "progress over partisanship." Furthermore, Gerber was publicly and vociferously endorsed by then Pennsylvania Governor and former Philadelphia Mayor Ed Rendell.

== 2006 and re-election ==
Gerber's freshman term came to an end in 2006. He went unchallenged in the Democratic primary, but was challenged by local Republican businessman Tom Gale in the general election.

A major issue of contention in this election was the 2005 Pennsylvania General Assembly pay raise controversy. This bill would have seen state legislators receive a significant increase in salary. Representative Gerber voted against the pay raise. When the bill passed, Gerber refused to take the pay raise and sponsored legislation to repeal it. Ultimately, the bill was repealed.

Gerber won the election in a landslide. Gerber won 67% of the vote and defeated his opponent by close to 9,500 votes.

== 2007–2012 ==
Since re-election in 2006, Gerber has continued to play a prominent role in the House of Representatives. He has taken part in the passage of several notable pieces of legislation and has developed close working relations with several key members on both sides of the aisle, including then Governor Ed Rendell.

Gerber played an instrumental part in the development and passage of Senate Bill 246. The Bill provides for a comprehensive smoking ban for the state. Gerber had originally sponsored a more restrictive ban in the house, and many of his ideas made it into the Senate version.

Representative Gerber also sponsored and passed House Bill 1202, the “Clean Fuels and Energy Independence Act,” which established mandates for renewable content in on-road transportation fuels and aimed to increase the Commonwealth's production of biofuels.

Additionally, Gerber continued to keep the concerns of the residents of the 148th District in mind. While in office, Gerber championed the causes of various groups and organizations around the district. Gerber has succeeded in securing funding for community centers, youth sports, township restoration, community police forces, historical societies, and various other local institutions.

Gerber won his third term in office on November 4, 2008. He garnered 66.7% of the vote. His opponent, Matthew McGuire got the remaining 33.3%.

Throughout 2010, Gerber worked tirelessly as an advocate to obtain healthy food choices for students in local schools. Gerber sponsored House Bill 1572, known as the "Healthy Schools Bill" in an attempt to cut sugary beverages and fatty snacks from menus at schools and provide more nutritious alternatives in their stead. The bill passed on the House floor by a vote of 116 to 83.

On November 2, 2010, Gerber defeated Matthew McGuire in a rematch of the 2008 election. Gerber defeated McGuire by a margin of 62% to 38%.

== 2012–present ==
Gerber announced in July 2012 that he would not seek re-election to another term in the Pennsylvania House of Representatives, announcing also that he will become Senior Vice President of Public Affairs for Franklin Square Capital Partners (now FS Investments), an investment firm in Philadelphia, Pennsylvania with $25 billion in assets under management as of November 2021.

Prior to joining the firm, Mike was a member of the Board of Directors for FS Investment Corporation II, one of the firm's funds. Mike is currently a partner and serves on the firm's executive committee as Chief Corporate Affairs Officer and as President of the FS Foundation, the firm's charitable foundation.

As President of the FS Foundation, Mike co-founded Philadelphia Financial Scholars (PFS) with the University of Pennsylvania's Netter Center for Community Partnerships, which partners with local companies and organizations to offer a financial literacy and entrepreneurship program for high school students. Mike currently serves as the program's Board Chair.

In addition to his roles at FS Investments, Mike serves on the board of trustees of the University of Pennsylvania and on the board of directors of the Chamber of Commerce for Greater Philadelphia, where he is also a member of the executive committee. He also serves on the boards of the Small Business Investor Alliance, based in Washington, D.C., and the Philadelphia Equity Alliance.

Gerber was officially designated to the Federal Retirement Thrift Investment Board by Biden.

== Political accomplishments ==
While in office, Gerber accomplished several notable legislative feats. He was the driving force behind Growing Greener II legislation, leading the charge to become environmentally friendly in Pennsylvania. In recognition of his commitment to the environment, Gerber was named as Chairman of the Energy Subcommittee during his freshman term, making him the only freshman legislator to hold the position of chair.

Gerber was also a major force in the passage of the Smoke Free Pennsylvania Act, a bi-partisan effort to implement a statewide smoking ban in Pennsylvania.

Mike held the positions of Deputy Whip and Chairman of the Southeastern Delegation of the House Democratic Caucus, Chair of the Subcommittee on Energy, and Chair of the Subcommittee on Public Transportation.

Beyond his roles in government, Mike served as served as Treasurer of the Democratic Legislative Campaign Committee and Chairman of the Pennsylvania House Democratic Campaign Committee.

== Issues ==
=== Early childhood education ===
The TAP 529 Program, supported by Gerber, was signed into law in his district. This program aims to assist grandparents in saving money for their grandchild's college education.

=== Environment ===
Gerber advocated the passage of Growing Greener II, which was signed in the 148th District at Prophecy Creek in Whitpain. Gerber also sponsored and passed House Bill 1202, which provides for the study and mandate of biofuels in Pennsylvania. Gerber scored an 89% on environmental advocacy group PennEnvironment's legislator scorecard for 2008 and 100% in 2006.

=== Senior citizens ===
Gerber hosted an annual health fair for seniors to attend and become informed about state services and benefits provided to seniors.

=== Veterans affairs ===
Gerber hosted an annual veteran's luncheon or trip to Washington, D.C. war memorials to commemorate the service of veterans in his district.

Pennsylvania House of Representatives
Preceded by Melissa Murphy Weber	Member of the Pennsylvania House of Representatives for the 148th District; 2005–2013	Succeeded by Mary Jo Daley
