= Narbrook Park Historic District =

Historic district in Pennsylvania, United States

- U.S. National Register of Historic Places
- U.S. Historic district
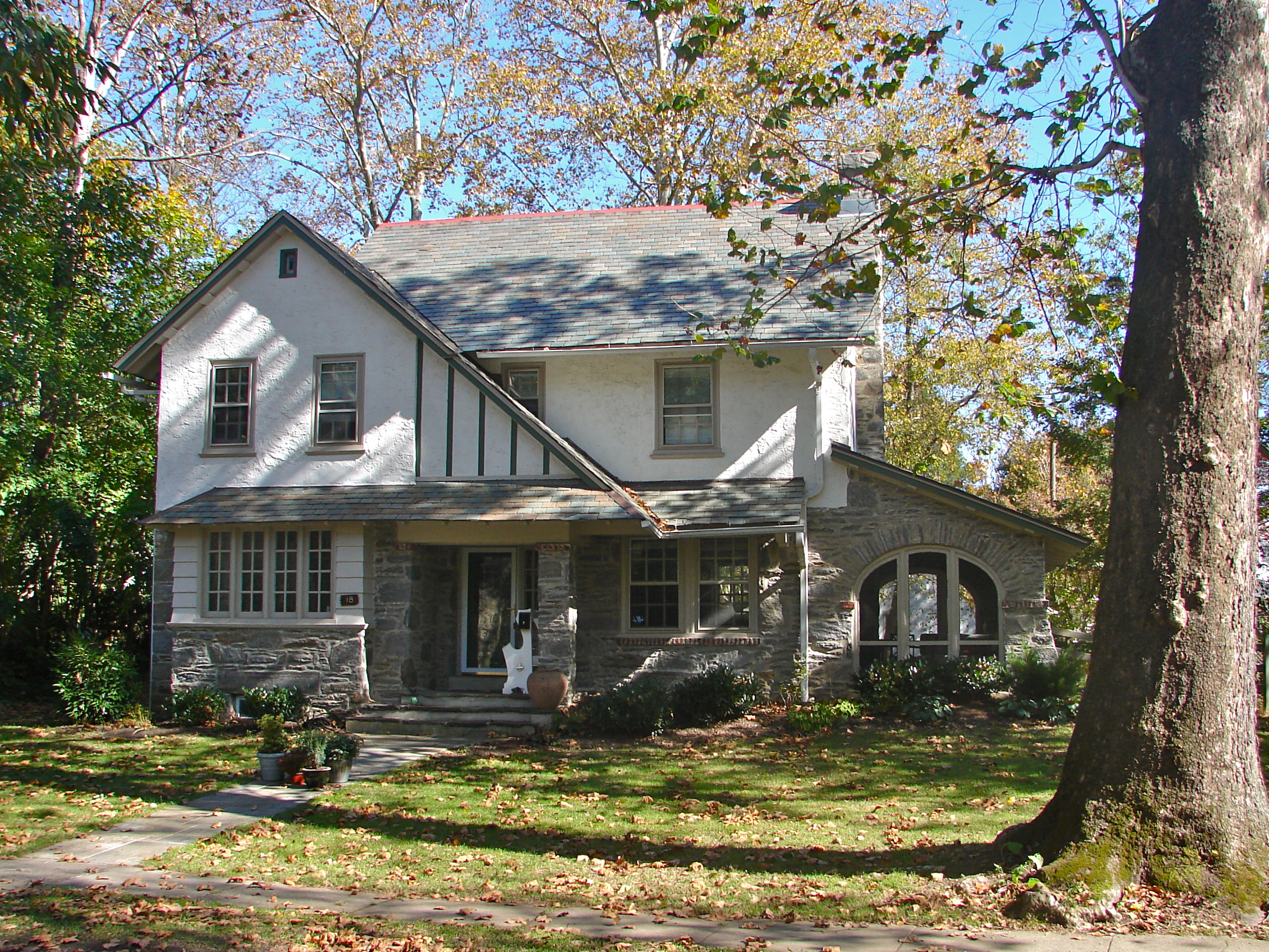
- House in the Narbrook Park Historic District, October 2011

- Location within Pennsylvania Location within the United States
- Location: Narbrook Rd. and Windsor Ave., Narberth, Pennsylvania
- Coordinates: 40°00′26″N 75°16′00″W
- Area: 14 acres (5.7 ha)
- Architect: Ford, George Burdett; et al.
- Architectural style: Bungalow/craftsman, Dutch Colonial Revival
- NRHP reference No.: 03001122
- Added to NRHP: November 7, 2003

The Narbrook Park Historic District, also known as Narberth Garden, is a national historic district that is located in Narberth, Montgomery County, Pennsylvania.

It was added to the National Register of Historic Places in 2003.

== History and notable features ==
Narbrook Park Historic District encompasses fifty-one contributing buildings, one contributing structure and one contributing site that are located in the planned garden suburb of Narbrook Park. Developed between 1915 and 1938, the dwellings here reflect a number of popular architectural styles, primarily Bungalow/American Craftsman and Dutch Colonial Revival. The community features thirty-five detached houses and dedicated open space.

Narbrook Park is owned by the Narbrook Park Improvement Association ("NPIA"), a Pennsylvania member corporation composed of dues-paying residents of Narbrook Park. The Park's residents, through NPIA, are solely responsible for Narbrook Park's funding, maintenance and upkeep.

Narbrook Park was added to the National Register of Historic Places in 2003, through the efforts of former resident Victoria Donahue.
