= Narberth, Pennsylvania =

Borough in Pennsylvania, US

Borough of Narberth
- Borough
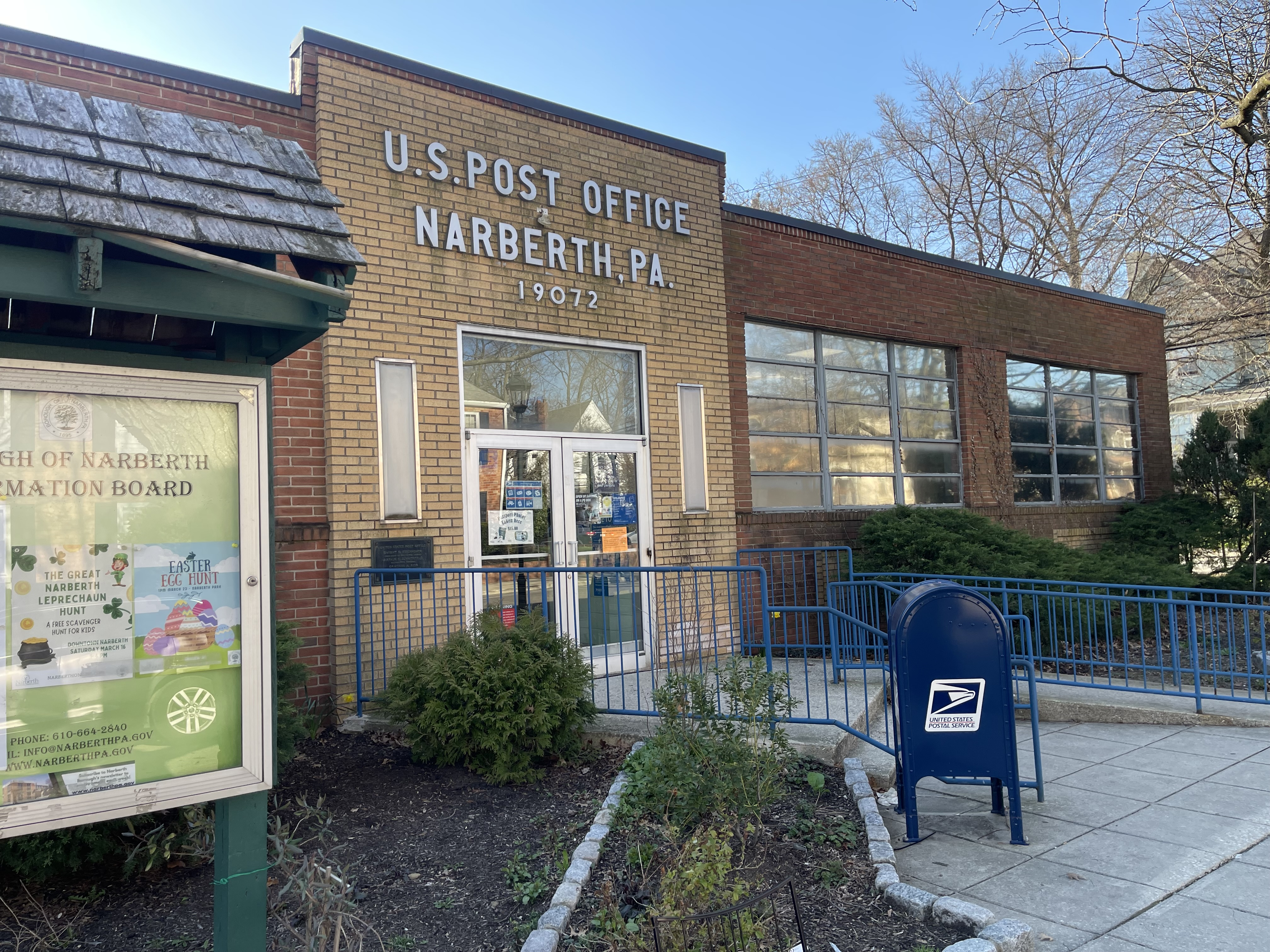
- Narberth post office

- Flag Seal

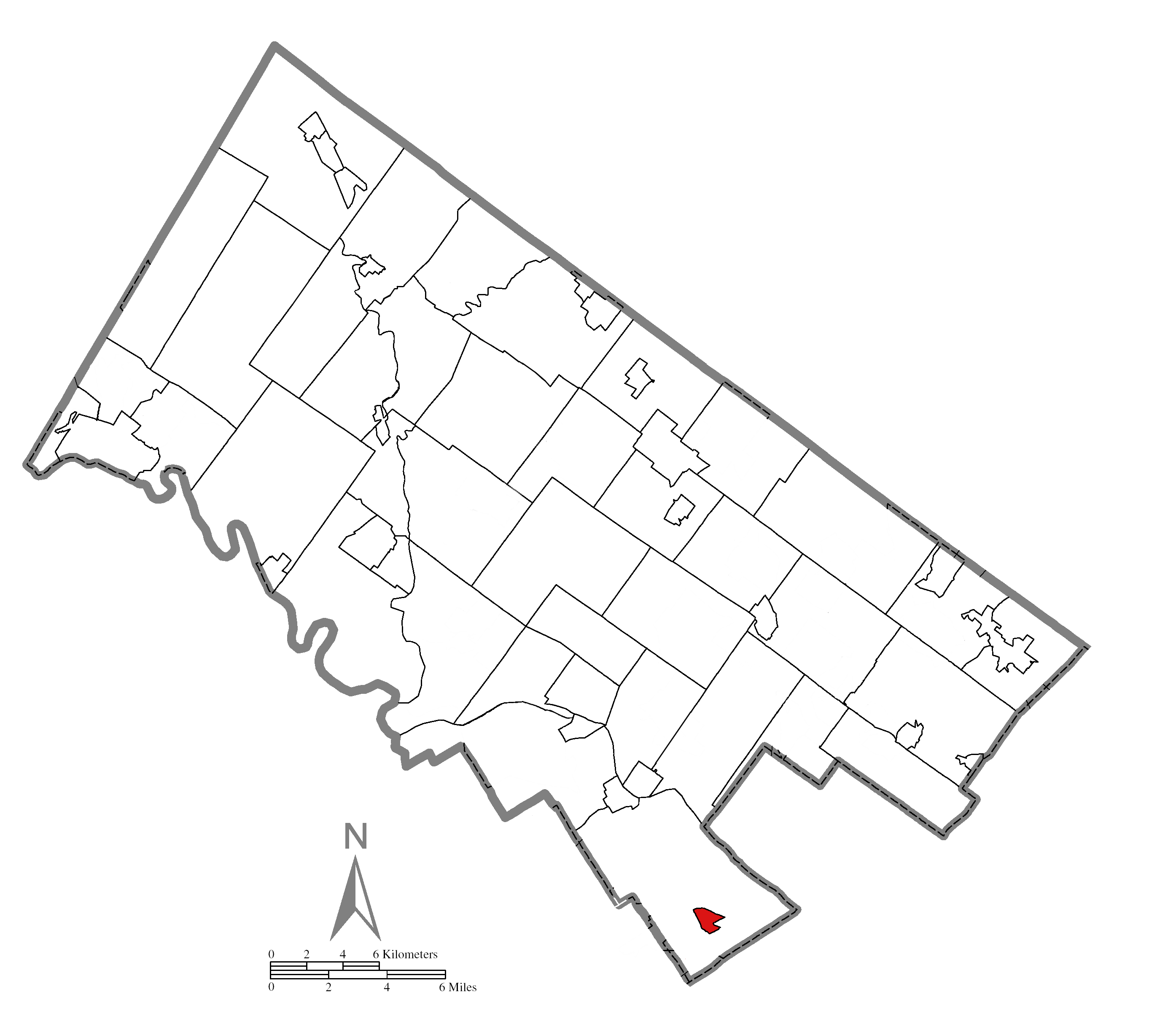
- Location of Narberth in Montgomery County, Pennsylvania

- Location of Narberth in Pennsylvania Narberth (the United States)
- Coordinates: 40°00′27″N 75°15′44″W
- Country: United States
- State: Pennsylvania
- County: Montgomery
- Settled: 1682

Government
  - Type: Council-manager
  - Mayor: Dana W. Edwards (D)

Area
  - Total: 0.50 sq mi (1.30 km^{2})
  - Land: 0.50 sq mi (1.30 km^{2})
  - Water: 0 sq mi (0.00 km^{2})
- Elevation: 308 ft (94 m)

Population (2020)
  - Total: 4,492
  - Density: 8,930/sq mi (3,449/km^{2})
- Time zone: UTC-5 (EST)
  - Summer (DST): UTC-4 (EDT)
- ZIP Code: 19072
- Area codes: 610 and 484
- FIPS code: 42-52664
- Website: www.narberthborough.com

Narberth is a borough in Montgomery County, Pennsylvania, United States. It is one of many neighborhoods on the historic Philadelphia Main Line. The population was 4,492 at the 2020 census.

== History ==
Narberth is located on a parcel of land originally deeded to Edward Rees, which later became "Prees" and eventually "Price", who arrived from Wales in 1682. A portion of this original tract became the 100-acre (0.40 km^{2}) farm of Edward R. Price, who founded Elm as a Quaker-friendly town in 1881. The town name changed to Narberth in 1893, and Narberth was incorporated in 1895. In 1995, the borough celebrated its 100th birthday with a year-long celebration.

The Narbrook Park Historic District was listed on the National Register of Historic Places in 2003.

== Demographics ==
Historical population
Census	Pop.	Note	%±
1900	847		—
1910	1,790		111.3%
1920	3,704		106.9%
1930	4,669		26.1%
1940	5,217		11.7%
1950	5,407		3.6%
1960	5,109		−5.5%
1970	5,151		0.8%
1980	4,496		−12.7%
1990	4,278		−4.8%
2000	4,233		−1.1%
2010	4,282		1.2%
2020	4,492		4.9%

=== 2020 census ===
As of the 2020 census, Narberth had a population of 4,492.

The median age was 41.2 years. 23.8% of residents were under the age of 18 and 16.4% were 65 years of age or older. For every 100 females there were 91.6 males, and for every 100 females age 18 and over there were 86.2 males age 18 and over.

100.0% of residents lived in urban areas, while 0.0% lived in rural areas.

There were 1,916 households, of which 32.4% had children under the age of 18 living in them. Of all households, 46.7% were married-couple households, 17.8% were households with a male householder and no spouse or partner present, and 30.6% were households with a female householder and no spouse or partner present. About 33.5% of all households were made up of individuals and 10.4% had someone living alone who was 65 years of age or older.

There were 2,016 housing units, of which 5.0% were vacant. The homeowner vacancy rate was 1.3% and the rental vacancy rate was 4.8%.

Racial composition as of the 2020 census
Race	Number	Percent
White	3,788	84.3%
Black or African American	158	3.5%
American Indian and Alaska Native	3	0.1%
Asian	203	4.5%
Native Hawaiian and Other Pacific Islander	1	0.0%
Some other race	49	1.1%
Two or more races	290	6.5%
Hispanic or Latino (of any race)	154	3.4%

=== 2010 census ===
As of the 2010 census, the borough was 90.4% White, 1.9% Black or African American, 4.4% Asian, 0.1% Native Hawaiian, and 2.7% were two or more races. 2.4% of the population were of Hispanic or Latino ancestry.

=== 2000 census ===
As of the census of 2000, there were 4,233 people, 1,904 households, and 1,037 families residing in the borough. The population density was 8,571.7 inhabitants per square mile (3,309.6/km^{2}). There were 1,981 housing units at an average density of 4,011.5 per square mile (1,548.8/km^{2}). The racial makeup of the borough was 95.23% White, 1.18% African American, 0.12% Native American, 2.27% Asian, 0.14% from other races, and 1.06% from two or more races. Hispanic or Latino of any race were 1.39% of the population.

There were 1,904 households, out of which 26.3% had children under the age of 18 living with them, 44.9% were married couples living together, 7.8% had a female householder with no husband present, and 45.5% were non-families. 37.2% of all households were made up of individuals, and 10.2% had someone living alone who was 65 years of age or older. The average household size was 2.22 and the average family size was 3.02.

In the borough, the population was spread out, with 22.3% under the age of 18, 5.2% from 18 to 24, 34.9% from 25 to 44, 24.9% from 45 to 64, and 12.7% who were 65 years of age or older. The median age was 39.6 years. For every 100 females there were 85.1 males. For every 100 females age 18 and over, there were 81.0 males.

=== Income and poverty ===
In 2021, the median estimated income for a household in the borough was $133,475. Males had a median income of $59,076 versus $41,518 for females. The per capita income for the borough was $35,165. About 2.6% of families and 3.4% of the population were below the poverty line, including 2.5% of those under age 18 and 6.4% of those age 65 or over.

The borough has many square blocks of fine old Victorian homes and apartment buildings, and most of its families live north and west of downtown areas, extending north along Montgomery Avenue to North Wynnewood Avenue.

== Geography ==
According to the U.S. Census Bureau, the borough has a total area of 0.5 square miles (1.3 km^{2}), all land.

Narberth is an enclave surrounded by Lower Merion Township, close to the western edge of the city of Philadelphia. It is part of the Philadelphia Main Line, a string of leafy, picturesque suburbs with quaint Welsh names extending west from Philadelphia along the old Pennsylvania Railroad's "main line" from Merion through Ardmore, Bryn Mawr, Villanova, Devon and Wayne among other towns and municipalities. Narberth is unique among those locations in that it is fairly enclosed; no major thoroughfares run through the town, but Montgomery Avenue runs northwest–southeast along the borough's northern border.

Because of its small size, many of Narberth's shopping and recreational facilities are within walking distance of residents' houses. SEPTA's "Main Line" railroad tracks separate North Side from South Side. Narberth is mostly a residential community, with a central business district along Haverford, Narberth, Forrest, and Essex Avenues. The borough is bordered by the communities of Wynnewood, Merion, and Penn Valley.

== Climate ==
The climate in this area is characterized by hot, humid summers and generally mild to cool winters. According to the Köppen Climate Classification system, Narberth has a humid subtropical climate, abbreviated "Cfa" on climate maps.

Average monthly temperatures range from 32.2 °F in January to 77.2 °F in July.

== Commerce ==
Narberth's business district has a variety of small, generally independent businesses. Some have been there for decades. Narberth also has an independent movie theater located in its downtown. Many borough businesses belong to the Narberth Business Association, which promotes the town as a shopping destination and also puts on occasional events, including the Spring Sidewalk Sale and the Narberth Dickens Festival.

== Recreation ==
The Borough of Narberth maintains two recreational facilities: The Narberth Playground and the Sabine Avenue Playground. The Narberth Playground has two basketball courts, a skate park (once three tennis courts), a field area, a junior basketball court (once volleyball), and a playground for younger children. The Sabine Avenue Tot Lot, on the grounds of the former Narberth Elementary School, is the smaller of the two and was recently renovated with new playground equipment. In addition, the borough sponsors a Fall soccer program, a Spring baseball program, a Summer basketball program, and many other sports and recreation activities.

== Politics and government ==
Presidential elections results
Year	Republican	Democratic
2024	15.2% 451	84.8% 2,509
2020	14.8% 466	84.5% 2,666
2016	16.4% 448	80.1% 2,191
2012	23.9% 625	74.9% 1,959
2008	23.0% 608	75.9% 2,009
2004	29.7% 780	69.9% 1,838
2000	32.1% 754	65.0% 1,525

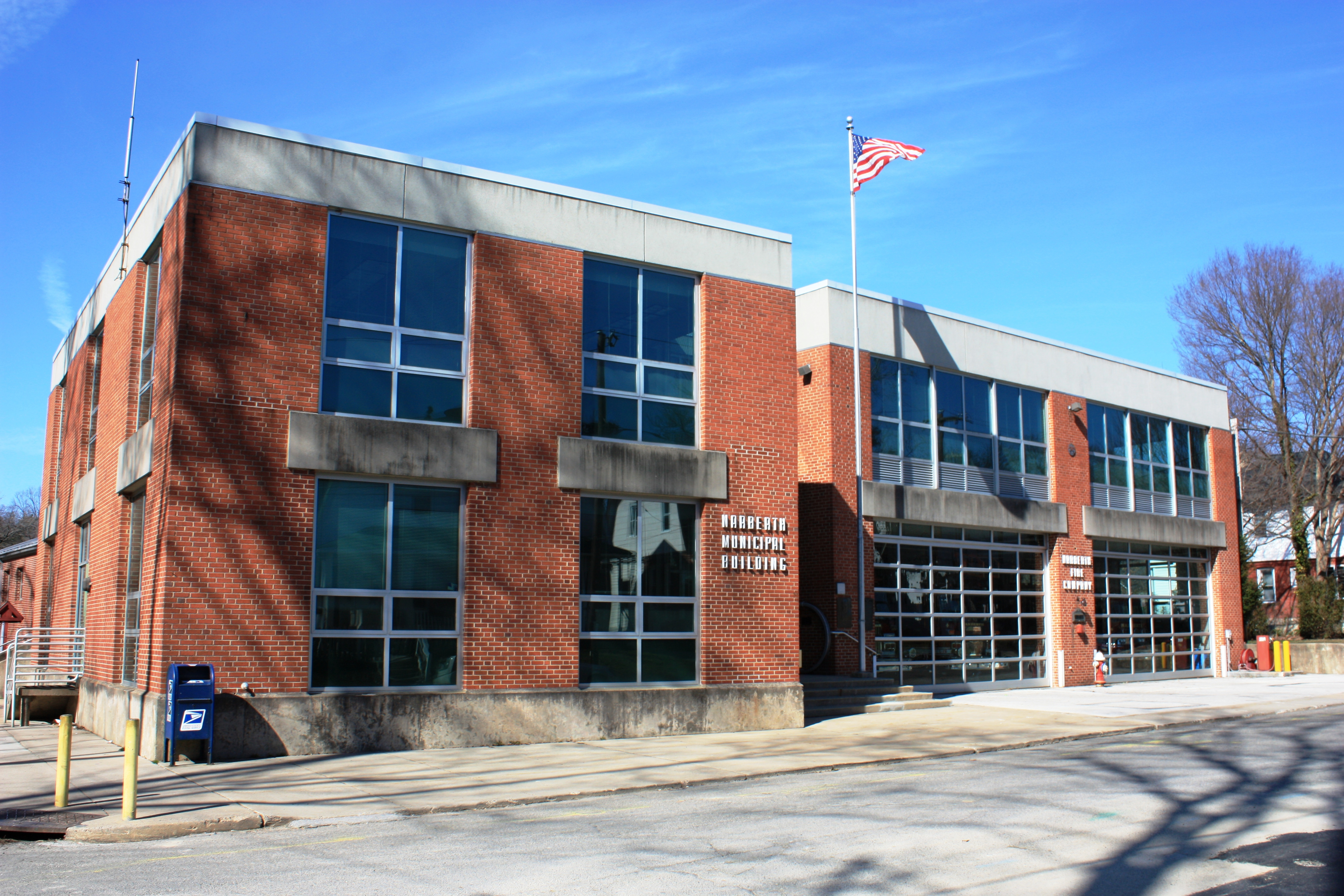
Narberth Municipal Building

Narberth has a city manager form of government with a mayor and a seven-member borough council. The mayor is Dana W. Edwards, a Democrat. The members of Borough Council, all of whom are Democrats, are Fred Bush (president), Cyndi Rickards (vice president), Jean Burock, Ira Winston, Michael Gaudini, Jim Speer, and Mike Salmanson. The Borough Manager is Maggie Dobbs. The Solicitor is John Walko.

The borough is part of Pennsylvania's Fifth Congressional District (represented by Mary Scanlon). In the US Senate, the Borough is represented by Senator John Fetterman (senior senator) and Dave McCormick (junior senator). In the Pennsylvania General Assembly, the Borough is part of the 148th State House District (represented by Rep. Mary Jo Daley) and the 17th State Senate District (represented by Sen. Amanda Cappelletti).

== Education ==
=== Public K-12 education ===
Residents of Narberth are served by the Lower Merion School District (LMSD). As of 2024 the school zoning for the borough is as follows: most of the borough (portions north of Haverford Avenue) is zoned to Belmont Hills Elementary School and Welsh Valley Middle School, while portions south of Haverford Avenue are zoned to Merion Elementary School and Bala Cynwyd Middle School. For high school, a portion is in the walking zone for Lower Merion High School. The rest of the borough is in a choice zone where students may attend either Lower Merion HS or Harriton High School. All of the mentioned schools are in Lower Merion Township. Penn Valley Elementary School, also located in the township, has a Narberth post office address, though as of 2024 its attendance boundary does not include any part of Narberth borough.

Narberth, then in Lower Merion Township, was in LMSD when, circa 1892, the first Narberth School was established. Narberth separated from the township, and in 1895, LMSD sold the building to the borough school district. The last building for Narberth Elementary School opened in 1963. LMSD began operating the school again in 1966, and at that time, Narberth Elementary was the sole public school in the borough limits. That year, students in South Narberth were reassigned to Merion Elementary School, while the Merion Park community was rezoned to Narberth Elementary. In 1966, Narberth residents were zoned to Ardmore Junior High School.

Narberth Elementary School closed in 1978. The school closed due to a vote by the LMSD board of trustees, seven in favor and two against. Residents were rezoned to Cynwyd Elementary School. There was a lawsuit to try to prevent the closure of Narberth Elementary, but the lawsuit was later canceled. The school district gave the former Narberth school to the borough government, and an engineering company rented the building. The lease agreement had a stipulation in the event that LMSD needed additional school space. In 1996 the former school was still being used as an office facility.

Belmont Hills Elementary closed in 1981, but by 1996 the district considered reopening it or Narberth Elementary, though the district leadership was closer to supporting the reopening of Belmont Hills elementary. This was because reopening Narberth Elementary meant that LMSD would have had to reacquire the building, which it could not do in a manner the district leadership felt was timely. The district would not have been able to take control of the building until 1999. Of the possible choices of facilities to reopen, LMSD would have had to spend $11,100,000 on a reopened Narberth Elementary, making it the option where the district had to spend the most money. People living in Narberth did not significantly advocate for the reopening of Narberth Elementary. In 1997, students in the South Narberth area were zoned to Merion Elementary, which was and is within walking distance.

By 1998 the school district established a new attendance boundary for Belmont Hills Elementary, which included the northern part of Narberth, with that section taken from Cynwyd Elementary. This meant that students began to have longer times to travel to school. The organization "Parents Against Gerrymandering," made up of parents from the borough, sued the school district to try to stop the rezoning. Several parents preferred rezoning to Merion Elementary instead.

=== Other education ===
The parish Saint Margaret's Elementary Catholic School is in Narberth borough. Religious schools in the immediate vicinity include the private Waldron Mercy Academy and Merion Mercy Academy Catholic schools, and Torah Academy in nearby Wynnewood. Nearby private schools include Friends' Central School on City Avenue, the French International School in Bala Cynwyd, Gladwyne Montessori in Gladwyne, the girls schools Agnes Irwin in Rosemont, Baldwin in Bryn Mawr, the boys school The Haverford School in Haverford, and coeducational Episcopal Academy in Newtown Square and Shipley School in Bryn Mawr.

Montgomery County Community College is the community college for all of Montgomery County. Narberth is close to Saint Joseph's University, which occupies an increasingly large campus in nearby Merion on City Avenue. Haverford College, Bryn Mawr College, Villanova University, Eastern University, and Rosemont College are nearby to the west, while the University of Pennsylvania, Drexel University, Thomas Jefferson University, Philadelphia University, and Temple University are nearby to the east in the City of Philadelphia.

The Narberth Community Library functions as the library for the borough.

== Transportation ==
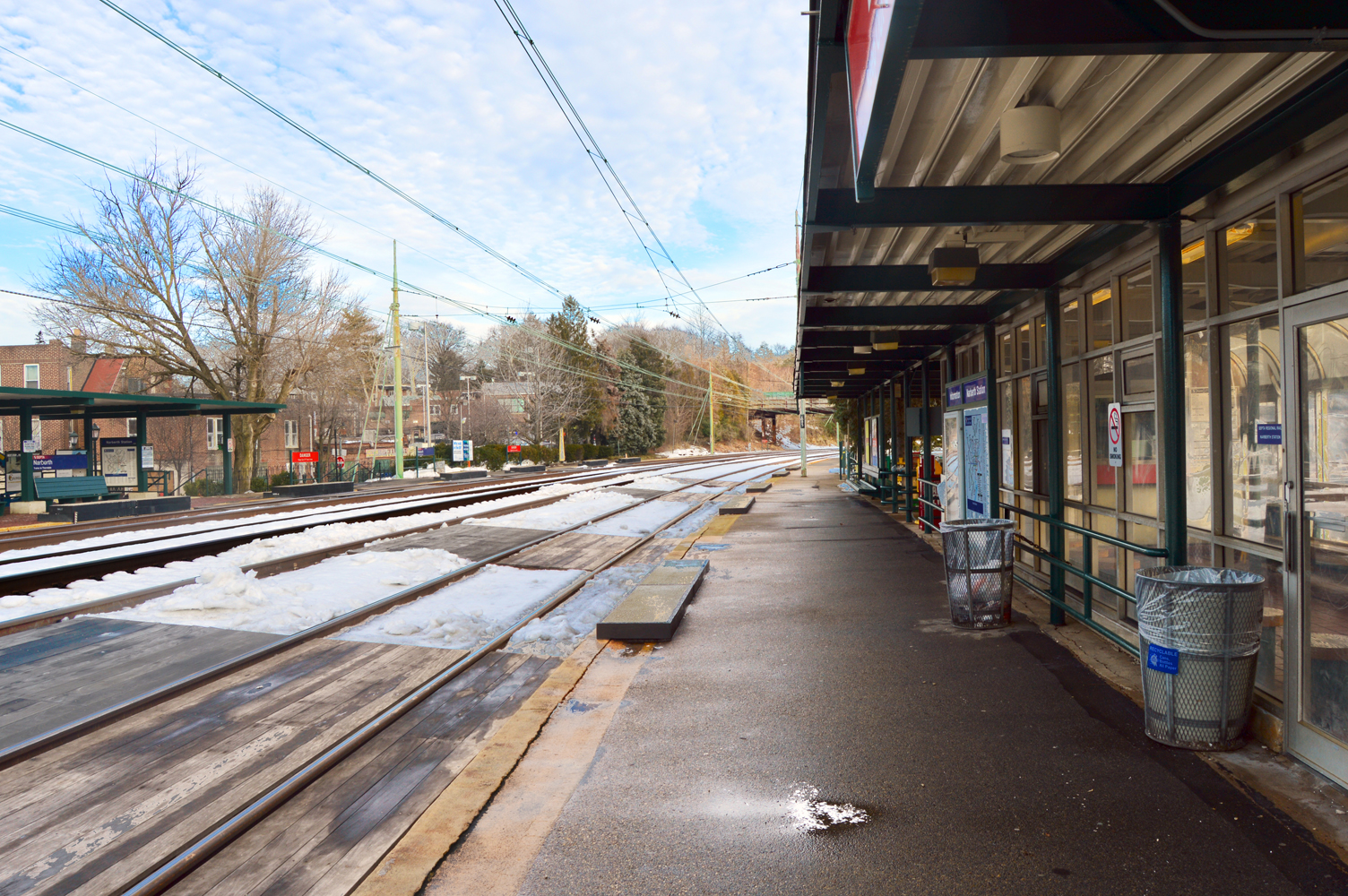
SEPTA commuter rail station at Narberth, PA

As of 2009 there were 11.06 miles (17.80 km) of public roads in Narberth, of which 0.32 miles (0.51 km) were maintained by the Pennsylvania Department of Transportation (PennDOT) and 10.74 miles (17.28 km) were maintained by the borough.

No numbered highways directly serve Narberth. Main streets traversing the borough include Narberth Avenue, Wynnewood Road and Haverford Avenue. The nearest state highways are Pennsylvania Route 23, U.S. Route 30, U.S. Route 1, and Interstate 76, all traversing the surrounding township of Lower Merion.

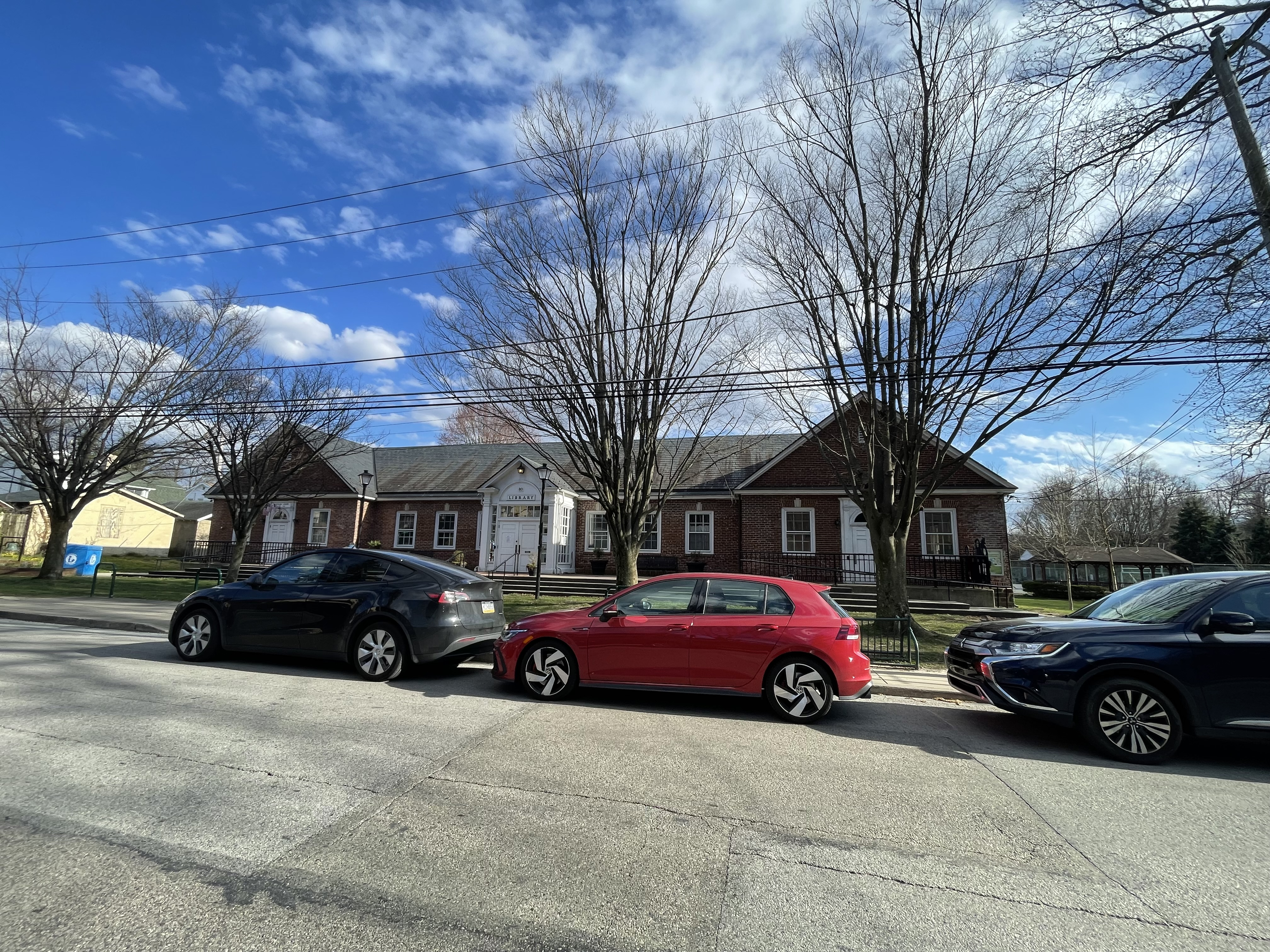
Narberth Community Library

The Narberth Train Station, the third stop on SEPTA's Paoli/Thorndale Line to Center City Philadelphia, is located on Haverford Avenue in downtown Narberth. These railroad tracks run through the Philadelphia Main Line, the collective western suburbs of Philadelphia where the railroad westward was originally established. Towns on the lower Main Line adjacent to Narberth include Overbrook, Merion, Wynnewood, Ardmore, Haverford, and Bryn Mawr. The SEPTA Route 105 bus runs along the length of Lancaster Avenue on the Main Line, and the SEPTA Route 44 bus supplements the trains for service between Narberth and Center City Philadelphia. South Wynnewood is served by the SEPTA's Norristown High Speed Line that connects the southern Main Line suburbs with Norristown to the north and west and SEPTA's 69th Street Transportation Center, where there is a connection to the Market–Frankford Line to Center City and beyond into Frankford north of Center City along the Delaware River.

== Hospitals ==
Philadelphia Surgery Center in Narberth specializes in small-scale endoscopic spine surgery.

Nearby Wynnewood is also home to one of the three principal teaching hospitals that serve Philadelphia's Main Line. Along with the eponymous Bryn Mawr and Paoli Memorial hospitals, Lankenau Medical Center, on Lancaster Pike (Route 30) in Wynnewood near the Overbrook border, has traditionally been affiliated with either Jefferson or Hahnemann (now Drexel) colleges of medicine and is always (with Bryn Mawr and Paoli) on the list of the nation's top community hospitals. Saunders House, a rehabilitation facility, can be found on Lankenau's premises, as is a large and busy medical office building that is home to many of the private practices of the hospital's attending physicians.

== Press ==
Local events are covered by The Main Line Times and the newer Main Line Life print newspapers.

== In popular culture ==
Fuzzytown, the fictional setting of the television show Carl the Collector, is modeled after Narberth, the residence of the show's creator.

== Notable people ==
- Bert Bell, former owner of the Philadelphia Eagles and National Football League commissioner
- Margaret Harshaw, former opera singer
- John Hickenlooper, U.S. senator for Colorado
- Kylie Kelce, podcaster and media personality
- Laurence Lafore, novelist and historian
- Jennifer Lame, Oscar-winning film editor
- Lizzy McAlpine, singer-songwriter
- Pug Southerland, U.S. Navy fighter pilot during World War II
