= Bechtle (surname) =

Bechtle is a surname. Notable people with the surname include:

- Louis Bechtle (1927–2024), United States federal judge
- Robert Bechtle (1932–2020), American painter
