= Guy K. Bard =

American judge

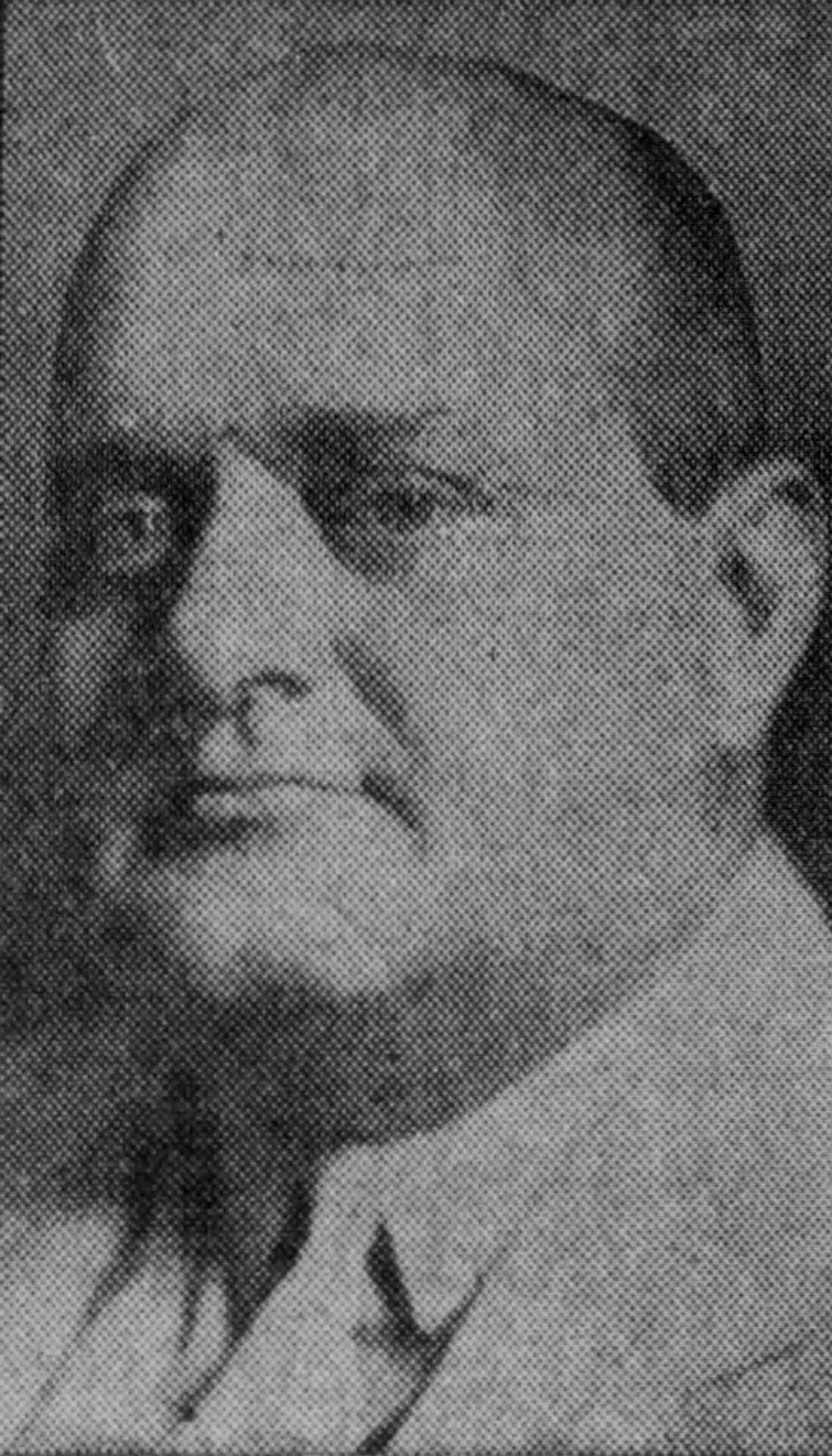

Judge of the United States District Court for the Eastern District of Pennsylvania
- In office December 20, 1939 – July 16, 1952
- Appointed by: Franklin D. Roosevelt
- Preceded by: Oliver Booth Dickinson
- Succeeded by: Francis Lund Van Dusen

Attorney General of Pennsylvania
- In office April 27, 1938 – January 17, 1939
- Governor: George Howard Earle III
- Preceded by: Charles J. Margiotti
- Succeeded by: Claude T. Reno

United States Attorney for the Eastern District of Pennsylvania
- In office March 1, 1937 – April 1, 1937
- Appointed by: Franklin D. Roosevelt
- Preceded by: Charles D. McAvoy
- Succeeded by: James Cullen Ganey

Personal details
- Born: Guy Kurtz Bard; October 24, 1895 Ephrata, Pennsylvania, US
- Died: November 23, 1953 (aged 58)
- Party: Democratic
- Education: Franklin & Marshall College (A.B.); University of Pennsylvania Law School (LL.B.)

Guy Kurtz Bard (October 24, 1895 – November 23, 1953) was a United States district judge of the United States District Court for the Eastern District of Pennsylvania.

== Education and career ==
Born on October 24, 1895, in the Lincoln neighborhood of Ephrata, Pennsylvania, Bard graduated from Millersville State Normal School (now Millersville University of Pennsylvania), then received an Artium Baccalaureus degree in 1916 from Franklin & Marshall College and a Bachelor of Laws in 1922 from the University of Pennsylvania Law School. He was a teacher in Lancaster County, Pennsylvania from 1911 to 1912. He was the principal of Warwick Township High School in Lititz, Pennsylvania from 1913 to 1915. He was the supervising principal of Ephrata schools from 1916 to 1918. He served in the United States Army from 1918 to 1919. He served as Secretary of the Democratic Committee of Lancaster County from 1920 to 1924, and served as its President from 1925 to 1934. He was in private practice in Lancaster, Pennsylvania from 1922 to 1939. In 1930, Bard was a candidate for Lieutenant Governor of Pennsylvania, and was a Pennsylvania delegate to the 1932 Democratic National Convention. He was special assistant to the Attorney General of the United States from 1934 to 1937. He was the United States Attorney for the Eastern District of Pennsylvania in 1937. He was a member of the Pennsylvania Public Utility Commission from 1937 to 1938. He was the Pennsylvania Attorney General from 1938 to 1939.

== Federal judicial service ==
Bard received a recess appointment from President Franklin D. Roosevelt on December 20, 1939, to a seat on the United States District Court for the Eastern District of Pennsylvania vacated by Judge Oliver Booth Dickinson. He was nominated to the same position by President Roosevelt on April 4, 1940. He was confirmed by the United States Senate on April 24, 1940, and received his commission on April 29, 1940. Bard was the first person from Lancaster County, Pennsylvania to be appointed a United States federal judge. His service terminated on July 16, 1952, due to his resignation to run for the United States Senate. In that effort, he defeated state auditor G. Harold Wagner to win the Democratic nomination, but lost in the general election.

== Post judicial service and death ==
Bard unsuccessfully ran for the United States Senate from Pennsylvania in 1952. He then returned to private practice in Pennsylvania from 1952 to 1953. He died on November 23, 1953.

== Honor ==
Bard Hall at Millersville University is named after Bard

Legal offices
| Preceded by Charles D. McAvoy | United States Attorney for the Eastern District of Pennsylvania; 1937 | Succeeded by James Cullen Ganey |
| Preceded by Charles J. Margiotti | Attorney General of Pennsylvania; 1938–1939 | Succeeded by Claude T. Reno |
| Preceded by Oliver Booth Dickinson | Judge of the United States District Court for the Eastern District of Pennsylvania; 1939–1952 | Succeeded by Francis Lund Van Dusen |
Party political offices
| Preceded by John Nalter | Democratic nominee for Lieutenant Governor of Pennsylvania; 1930 | Succeeded by Thomas Kennedy |
| Preceded by Joseph F. Guffey | Democratic nominee for United States Senator from Pennsylvania (Class 1); 1952 | Succeeded by George M. Leader |
