= A. Leon Higginbotham Jr. =

American judge (1928–1998)

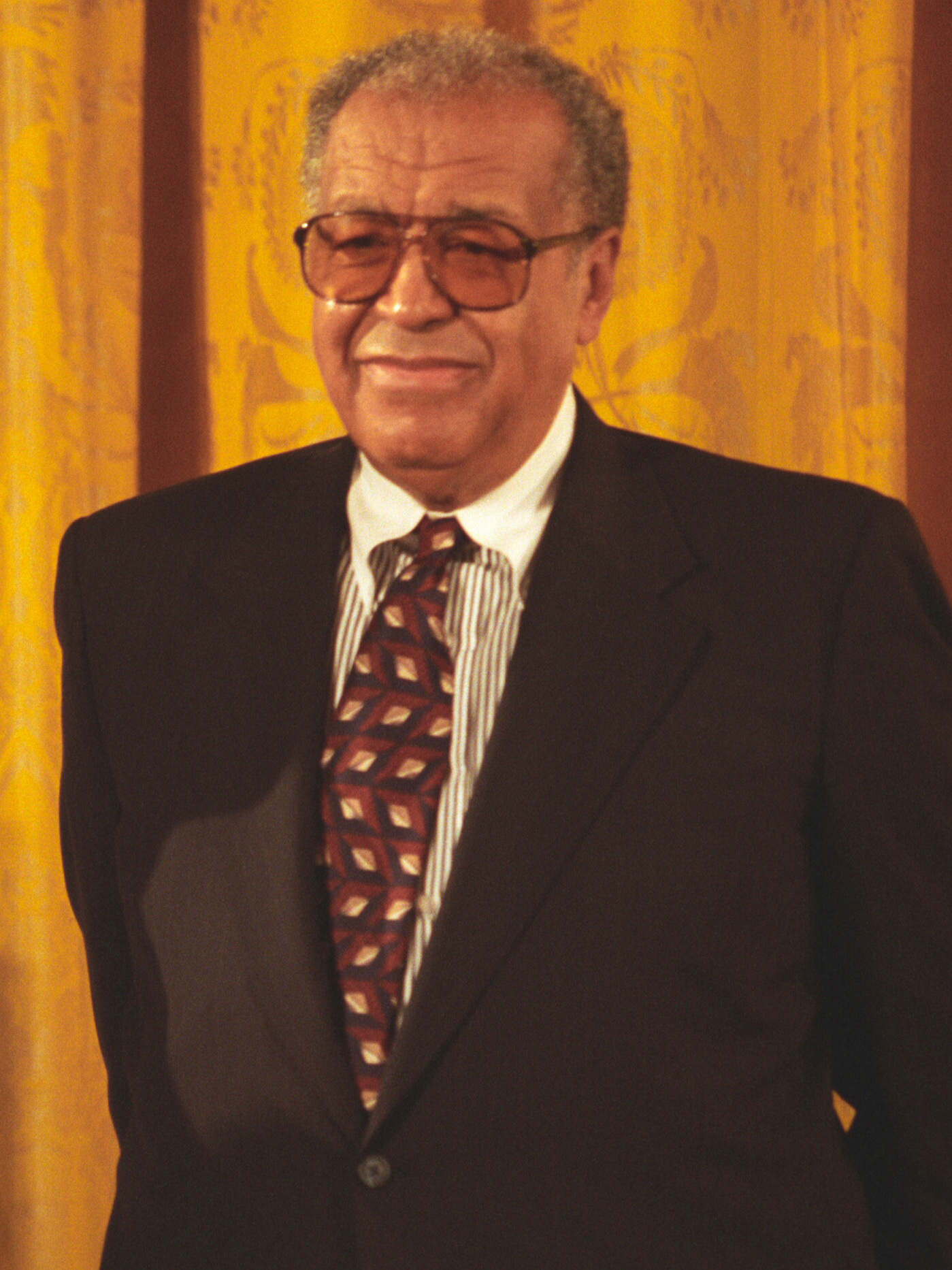
- Higginbotham with Bill Clinton at a Presidential Medal of Freedom ceremony, 1995.

Senior Judge of the United States Court of Appeals for the Third Circuit
- In office January 31, 1991 – March 5, 1993

Chief Judge of the United States Court of Appeals for the Third Circuit
- In office January 15, 1990 – January 31, 1991
- Preceded by: John Joseph Gibbons
- Succeeded by: Dolores Sloviter

Presiding Judge of the United States Foreign Intelligence Surveillance Court of Review
- In office May 19, 1979 – May 18, 1986
- Appointed by: Warren E. Burger
- Preceded by: Seat established
- Succeeded by: Collins J. Seitz

Judge of the United States Court of Appeals for the Third Circuit
- In office October 11, 1977 – January 31, 1991
- Appointed by: Jimmy Carter
- Preceded by: Francis Lund Van Dusen
- Succeeded by: Theodore McKee

Judge of the United States District Court for the Eastern District of Pennsylvania
- In office March 17, 1964 – November 7, 1977
- Appointed by: Lyndon B. Johnson
- Preceded by: James Cullen Ganey
- Succeeded by: Louis H. Pollak

Personal details
- Born: Aloyisus Leon Higginbotham Jr. February 25, 1928 Ewing Township, New Jersey, U.S.
- Died: December 14, 1998 (aged 70) Boston, Massachusetts, U.S.
- Spouse: Evelyn Brooks Higginbotham
- Education: Purdue University; Antioch College (BA); Yale University (LLB)

Aloyisus Leon Higginbotham Jr. (February 25, 1928 – December 14, 1998) was an American civil rights advocate, historian, presidential adviser, and federal court judge. From 1990 to 1991, he served as chief judge of the United States Court of Appeals for the Third Circuit. Originally nominated to the bench by President Kennedy in 1963, Higginbotham was the seventh African-American Article III judge appointed in the United States, and the first African-American United States district judge of the United States District Court for the Eastern District of Pennsylvania. He was elevated to the Third Circuit in 1977, serving as a federal judge for nearly 30 years in all. In 1995, President Bill Clinton awarded him the Presidential Medal of Freedom. Higginbotham used the name "Leon" informally.

== Early life and education ==
Higginbotham was born on February 25, 1928, in Ewing Township, a suburb of Trenton, New Jersey. His mother, Emma Lee Higginbotham, was a maid, and his father, Aloyisus Leon Higginbotham Sr., was a factory worker. Higginbotham was raised in a largely African-American neighborhood, and attended a segregated grammar school.

Higginbotham attended Lincoln School, a segregated high school in Trenton. Before Higginbotham attended, no black student had been put on the academic track (which was a significant step towards attending college), because Latin, a requirement for the program, was not taught at the black elementary schools. Higginbotham's mother convinced the principal at the junior high school to enroll him in a second-year Latin course, even though he had never studied first year Latin. To ensure that he was able to pass the required classes, the junior high Latin teacher offered to tutor him at her home during the summer. Higginbotham's family was of modest economic means, so he worked while attending school, mowing lawns, shoveling snow, and working as a bus boy at the Stacy Trent hotel. While in high school, Higginbotham manipulated his birth certificate in order to get working papers at 15, a year before the law allowed, so that he could work in a pottery factory shoveling clay.

=== Undergraduate education ===
At 16 Higginbotham enrolled in Purdue University, in West Lafayette, Indiana. He chose Purdue because it admitted black students; was cheaper, at that time, than Rutgers University; and offered tuition discounts for good academic performance. Higginbotham was also interested in Purdue because he wanted to be an engineer, and Purdue was known as an engineering school.

Higginbotham entered Purdue as a freshman in 1944. At the time, the student body was composed of approximately 6,000 white students, and 12 black students. Although eligible for admission, black students were not permitted to live in the dormitories. Higginbotham and the other 11 black students were placed in a building called International House, which was the only building in which blacks could live in West Lafayette. The students slept in the attic, which was unheated. Higginbotham sought a meeting with the University President, Edward C. Elliott, to ask permission for the students to sleep in a section of one of the heated dormitories. Elliott's response was purportedly "[t]he law doesn't require us to put you in those dormitories. The law doesn't even require us to let you in. You take it or leave it." Higginbotham would later identify this encounter, and an incident where he was traveling with the Purdue debate team but unable to stay in a hotel with the rest of the members, as the events that caused him to pursue a career in the law, saying:

And then, even though I had been doing very well there, I decided that engineering would not make any difference in America. The most which a black person could do as an engineer is to make a better gadget, but a gadget which would not significantly do anything with the oppression. So I guess on that trip back to the segregated house, International House, I decided that I wanted to go into law and to challenge the system.

Higginbotham transferred to Antioch College in Yellow Springs, Ohio, in 1945. On the day that Higginbotham entered Antioch, one other black student was also admitted, Coretta Scott, who would later become Coretta Scott King after marrying Martin Luther King Jr. At Antioch, Higginbotham served as the head of the college chapter of the NAACP. While in college, Higginbotham successfully convinced the Governor of Ohio to support legislation to lower the voting age to 18. Higginbotham earned his Bachelor of Arts degree in 1949.

=== Law school ===
In the fall of 1949 Higginbotham entered Yale Law School. As he had in grade school, he worked, this time as a butcher, to help support himself while at Yale. He was a member of the moot court team and the Barrister's Union (a mock trial organization). Higginbotham advanced to the finals of the first year moot court competition. The moot court panel before which he argued included Associate Justice Tom C. Clark (of the Supreme Court of the United States) and renowned appellate advocate John W. Davis. (A few years later, Davis would argue against Thurgood Marshall on behalf of the State of Kansas in Brown v. Board of Education.) In 1951, Higginbotham competed on a moot court team with Richard N. Gardner, who would later serve as United States Ambassador to Spain and the United States Ambassador to Italy. Higginbotham's Yale team competed against a team from Temple University Law School, which included another African American law student from the Philadelphia area, Clifford Scott Green, who would later become Higginbotham's colleague (first as a law partner and then as a fellow Judge on the Eastern District of Pennsylvania bench).

As a first-year student, Higginbotham worked as a research assistant to a professor, who arranged for him to attend the oral arguments in Sweatt v. Painter, which dealt with the admission of blacks to the University of Texas. Thurgood Marshall argued the case on behalf of Herman Sweatt, who had been denied admission to the university's law school. Higginbotham would later describe the experience of seeing Marshall arguing: "With controlled outrage, Marshall eloquently asserted the constitutional promise of equality for Sweatt, for all African Americans and, it seemed, for me personally." When the Court ruled in Sweatt's favor, Higginbotham later wrote, he felt that he had "witnessed the birth of racial justice in the Supreme Court." Higginbotham received his Bachelor of Laws from Yale in 1952. In 1969, as the first black person to become a trustee of Yale, he advocated opening the university's undergraduate program to women.

== Legal career ==
After graduation, Higginbotham initially sought employment with law firms in Philadelphia, Pennsylvania, however, he was unable to find work at any of the major firms as a result of his race. He began his career as a law clerk for Judge Curtis Bok of the Philadelphia County Court of Common Pleas. In 1953 he was hired by Philadelphia County District Attorney Richardson Dilworth as an assistant district attorney. Prior to Dilworth's arrival, no black lawyer had ever argued on behalf of the Commonwealth of Pennsylvania in the Courts of Common Pleas. Higginbotham was given the opportunity to argue both in front of the Court of Common Pleas, and the Superior Court of Pennsylvania.

In 1954 Higginbotham went into private practice as a member of the first African American law firm in Philadelphia, Norris, Schmidt, Green, Harris, and Higginbotham. In addition to Higginbotham, three of the other named partners went on to become judges; Harvey Schmidt and Doris Harris would later serve as judges on the Philadelphia Court of Common Pleas, and Clifford Scott Green was appointed to the Eastern District of Pennsylvania. Higginbotham stayed in private practice until 1962. While at the firm, Higginbotham practiced criminal defense and personal injury law. From 1960 to 1962 he was President of the Philadelphia chapter of the NAACP.

== Public service ==
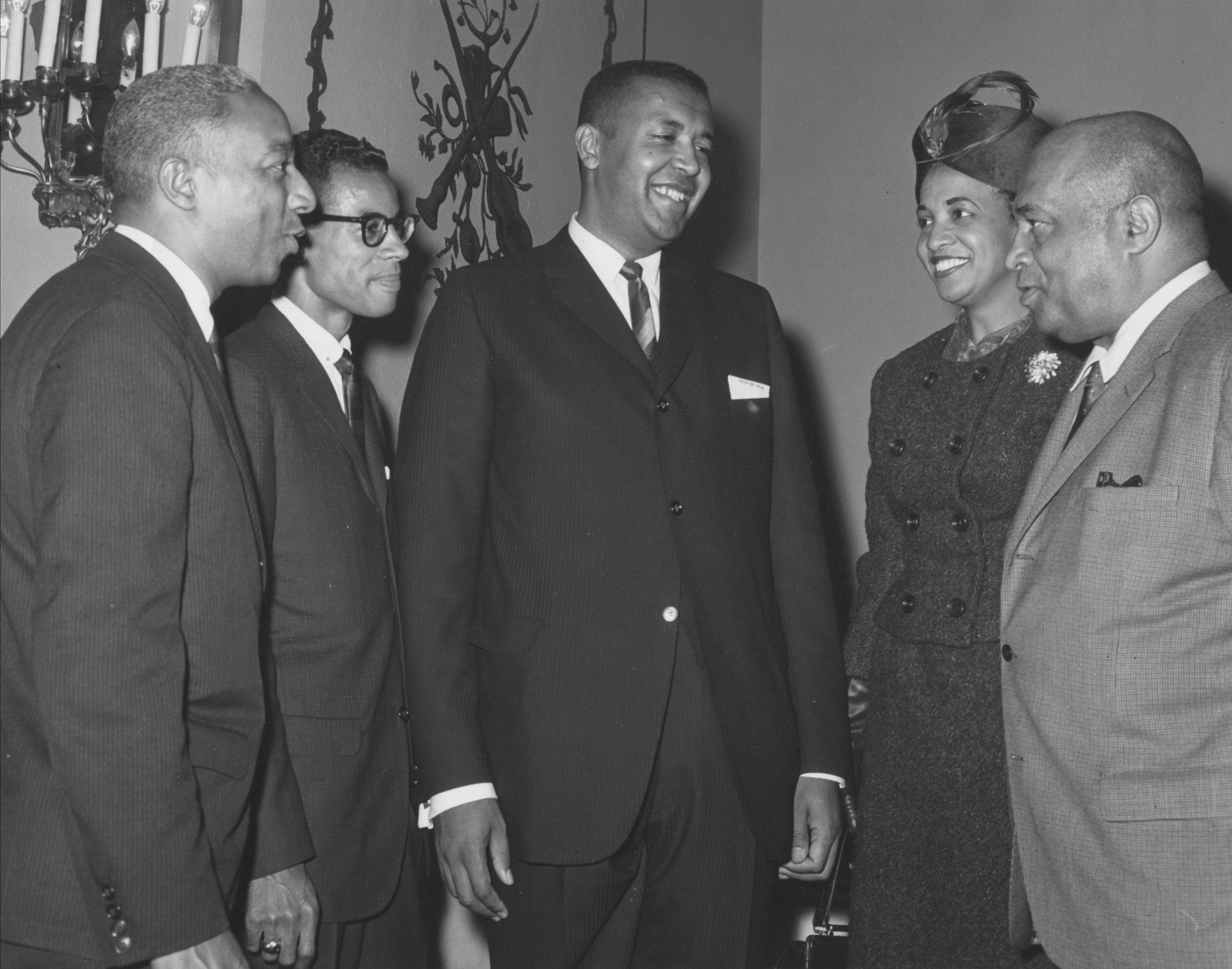
Judge Higginbotham with former law partners at his swearing into the FTC

While still in private practice, Higginbotham simultaneously served in several government positions; he was a special Deputy State Attorney General from 1956 to 1962, a special hearing officer for conscientious objections for the United States Department of Justice from 1960 to 1962, and a Commissioner on the Pennsylvania Human Rights Commission from 1961 to 1962. He was a faculty member of the Rutgers University Law School.

=== Federal Trade Commission ===
In 1960 Higginbotham, as a delegate at the National NAACP convention, supported Hubert Humphrey over John F. Kennedy for the organization's endorsement for president. Nevertheless, Kennedy appointed Higginbotham to be a commissioner on the Federal Trade Commission in 1962, the first African American appointed as a commissioner on any regulatory commission. Justice Byron White administered the oath of office.

Higginbotham ultimately became a strong supporter of President Kennedy, and began attending functions on behalf of the administration. He was also a guest at White House functions, including a state dinner for the King and Queen of Afghanistan that took place several weeks before Kennedy's assassination.

As of 2021, Higginbotham is one of just three African Americans to have served on the FTC. (The other two are Mozelle W. Thompson (who served from 1997 to 2004) and Pamela Jones Harbour (who served from 2003 to 2009).)

=== U.S. District Court ===
Attorney General Robert F. Kennedy, who had come to know Higginbotham through his work on the FTC, recommended that President Kennedy nominate him to be a judge on the Eastern District of Pennsylvania, which Kennedy did in 1963. Higginbotham's nomination was held up by Mississippi Senator James Eastland, the chairman of the Senate Judiciary Committee and a committed segregationist. Eastland delayed the nomination long enough so that, despite being passed by a subcommittee, Higginbotham's nomination lapsed following the death of President Kennedy, and the beginning of a new congressional term. Higginbotham received a recess appointment from President Lyndon B. Johnson on January 6, 1964, to a seat on the United States District Court for the Eastern District of Pennsylvania vacated by Judge James Cullen Ganey. He was nominated to the same position by President Johnson on February 3, 1964. He was confirmed by the United States Senate on March 14, 1964, and received his commission on March 17, 1964. At the time of his appointment, he was 36 years old. His service on the district court terminated on November 7, 1977, due to his elevation to the Third Circuit.

=== Adviser to President Johnson ===
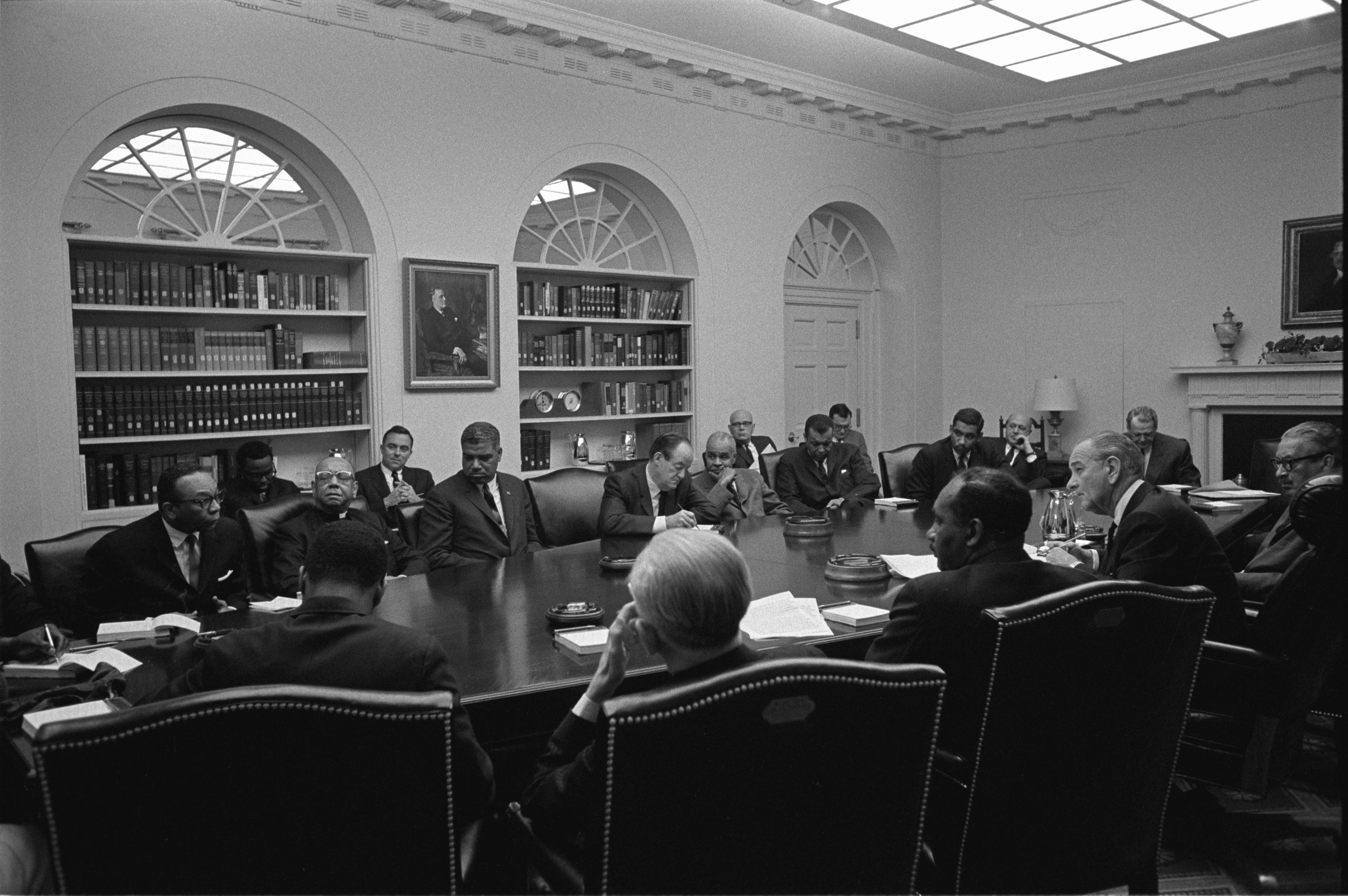
President Johnson meeting with civil rights leaders following the assassination of Martin Luther King Jr. Judge Higginbotham is seated two seats to the right of Vice President Humphrey

Following his appointment to the District Court, Higginbotham developed a relationship with President Johnson, attending various White House functions and conferences in the mid-1960s. The day after the assassination of Martin Luther King Jr., Higginbotham was called to the White House to take part in a series of meetings to advise the President on how to respond to King's death. Other notable figures at the meeting were Vice President Humphrey, Justice Marshall, Roy Wilkins, Whitney Young, Andrew Brimmer, Clarence Mitchell, Clifford Alexander, and Bayard Rustin. Higginbotham stayed the night at the White House, attended a service at the Washington National Cathedral, and continued to advise the President into the next days.

In 1967 Higginbotham arranged for President Johnson to visit North Philadelphia, to tour a community revitalization effort. Higginbotham would later describe Johnson's reaction to seeing the efforts of a small community to restore a dilapidated police station, saying "I think he was elated, absolutely exhilarated, because he saw results. It wasn't phony, and it wasn't something on which an extraordinary amount money had been spent." A year later, following the assassination of Robert F. Kennedy, President Johnson called on Higginbotham again, appointing him as a member of the newly created Commission on the Causes and Prevention of Violence. In 1968 he served as Vice Chairman of President Johnson's Kerner Commission.

Higginbotham attended the opening of Johnson's presidential library, where Johnson referred to Higginbotham as "one of my closest advisers, sound, reliable, responsible." Higginbotham would later say that he was thankful for the comment, but "had the impression that there were probably a few hundred other people there who got that accolade." Higginbotham met with Johnson two weeks before his death in 1973, along with then newly elected Congresswoman Barbara Jordan, to discuss Jordan's career in the House.

== Judicial career ==
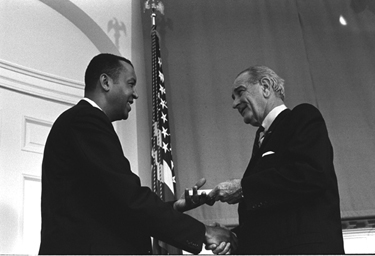
Judge Higginbotham receiving his commission from President Johnson

Higginbotham spent 13 years as a District Court judge. His chambers were originally in the Federal Courthouse and Post Office at 9th and Market Streets, in Philadelphia (the building was later named in honor of Robert N.C. Nix Sr., the first African American member of Pennsylvania's congressional delegation and father of Robert N.C. Nix Jr., the first African-American Chief Justice of the Pennsylvania Supreme Court). As a new judge, Higginbotham still encountered racism. On his first day on the district court, he parked his car in the area reserved for judges, and was yelled at by a guard "Hey, boy!" Higginbotham asked whether the guard was speaking to him, and when the guard responded that only judges were permitted to park in the area, Higginbotham replied: "I understand, and that's why I parked there." The guard said, "Oh, you're Judge Higginbotham. Welcome to the Court." Higginbotham would later remember the incident as "typical of a lot of things which have happened to both minorities and to women."

Higginbotham did not experience any such behavior from his fellow judges on the district court, although, as the youngest person ever appointed to the Eastern District (Higginbotham was younger than some of his colleagues' children), he would later recall that "the most difficult problem [in terms of human relations] was the phenomenon of age."

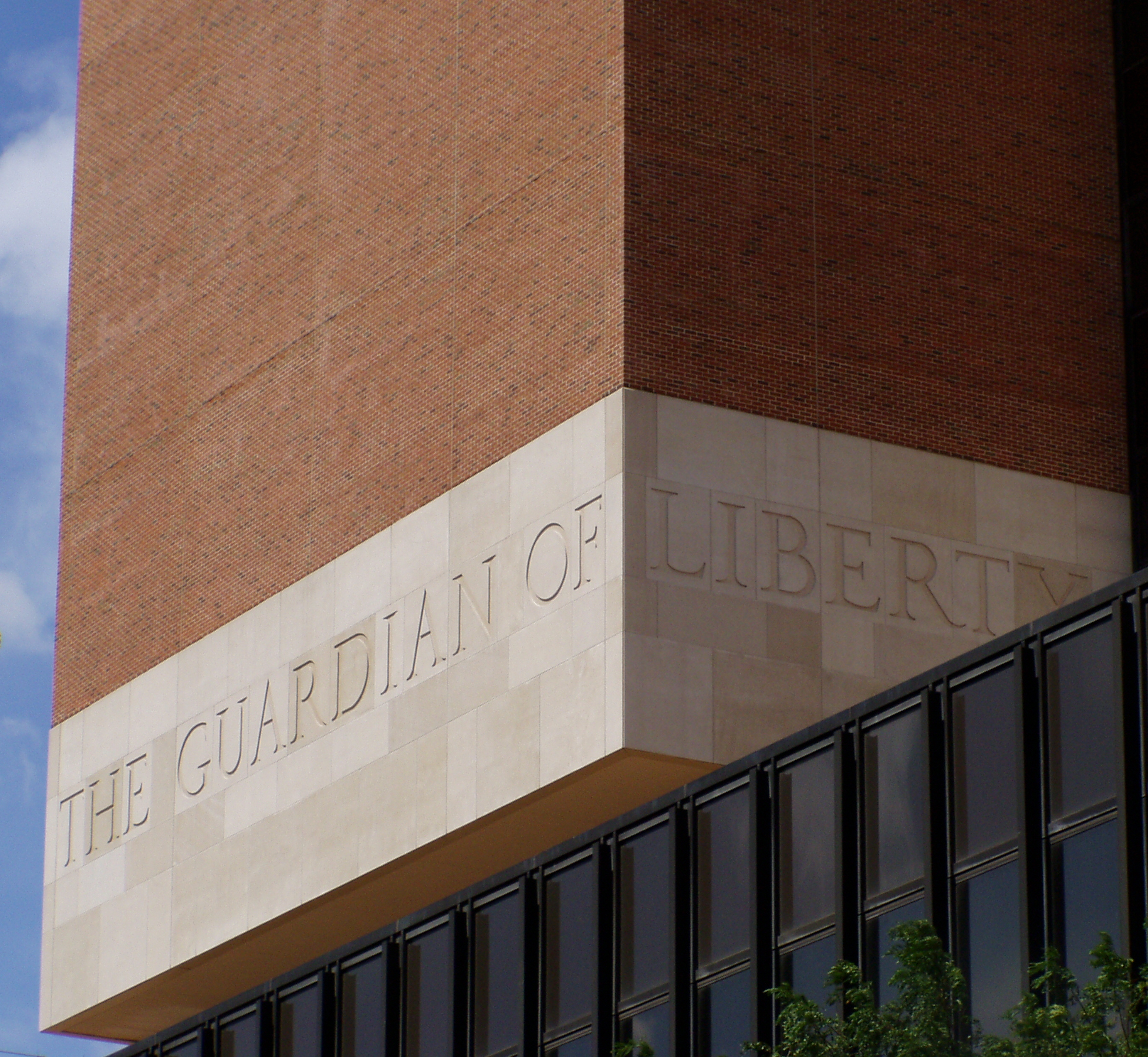
Judge Higginbotham's chambers on the Third Circuit were in the James A. Byrne Courthouse in Philadelphia

In 1972, he issued a temporary injunction that gave "preliminary injunctive relief” for the World Hockey Association that temporarily stopped the National Hockey League from using its reserve clause to stop players from jumping to the WHA such as Bobby Hull.

In 1974, Higginbotham issued his influential opinion in Comm. of Pa. v. Local 542, Int'l Union of Operating Engineers, explaining why he as an African American judge with a history of active involvement in the civil rights struggle was not obligated to recuse himself from presiding over litigation concerning claims of racial discrimination. He held, in an opinion that was followed by later judges, including a series of Black judges who faced recusal requests, that a judge should not be forced to recuse solely because of their membership in a minority group. Jewish federal Judge Paul Borman relied on the Higginbotham opinion in part in his 2014 decision not to recuse himself from the trial of Palestinian-American Rasmea Odeh.

Higginbotham was nominated by President Jimmy Carter on September 19, 1977, to a seat on the United States Court of Appeals for the Third Circuit vacated by Judge Francis Lund Van Dusen. He was confirmed by the United States Senate on October 7, 1977, and received his commission on October 11, 1977. Higginbotham's elevation came only a year after the opening of a new federal courthouse in Philadelphia, now called the James A. Byrne United States Courthouse, located at 6th and Market. Higginbotham would later describe his judicial philosophy on the appellate bench as being in line with Justice Cardozo, rejecting the strict constructionist concept, in favor of "an evolutionary concept in terms of what is fair and just in a society." He attacked strict constructionists as being inconsistent, "want[ing] an original intent for what are their conservative positions, and an evolutionary [position], in order to protect their conservative positions..." He was Chief Judge of the Court of Appeals from 1990 to 1991 and assumed senior status due to a certified disability on January 31, 1991. He retired from the bench on March 5, 1993.

In 1991, Judge Higginbotham wrote "An Open Letter to Justice Clarence Thomas From a Federal Judicial Colleague," published in the University of Pennsylvania Law Review. In his letter, Judge Higginbotham expressed his "concern and sorrow that Justice Thomas would turn his back on a century of [racial] struggle."

Higginbotham's first law clerk was Eleanor Holmes, later Eleanor Holmes Norton, who was the first female Chair of the U.S. Equal Employment Opportunity Commission and later Delegate to the United States House of Representatives from the District of Columbia (1991-present). One of his clerks for 1986–87 was Sandile Ngcobo, later Chief Justice of the Constitutional Court of South Africa. NAACP Legal Defense Fund president and director-counsel Sherrilyn Ifill also clerked during the summer of 1986.

== Academic and post-judicial career ==
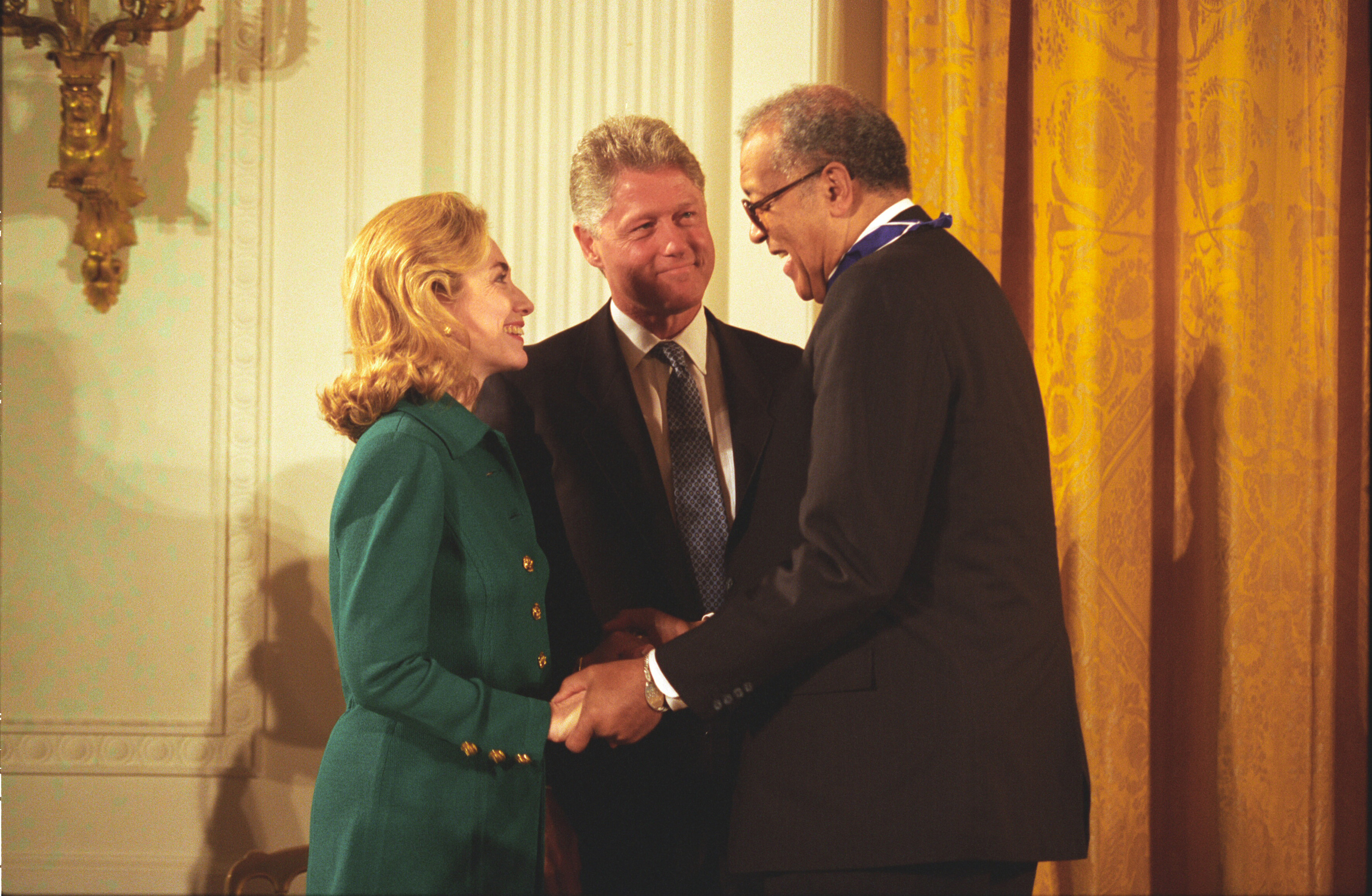
Judge Higginbotham with Hillary Clinton and President Clinton at the Medal of Freedom presentation

Higginbotham was an adjunct professor at the University of Pennsylvania for 24 years, in the sociology department and later in the law school. Higginbotham served as a trustee of the University of Pennsylvania from 1968 until his death in 1998. He was also a trustee of Yale University and of Thomas Jefferson University.

After retiring from the federal bench shortly after his 65th birthday (and with nearly three decades of federal judicial service), Higginbotham joined the firm of Paul, Weiss, Rifkind, Wharton & Garrison, and accepted a position at Harvard University's John F. Kennedy School of Government as a professor of Public Service Jurisprudence. He held both positions for the remainder of his life.

Higginbotham served as counsel to the Congressional Black Caucus in a series of voting rights cases before the Supreme Court. In 1996, Higginbotham served as an adviser to Texaco on human resources and diversity matters.

=== Publications ===
Higginbotham published In the Matter of Color: Race and the American Legal Process 1: The Colonial Period in 1978, which the Oxford University Press reissued in 1980. He also wrote or helped write over 100 law review articles. His second and surviving wife, Dr. Evelyn Brooks Higginbotham, was also a distinguished historian and faculty member of Harvard's History and African American Studies Departments. Judge Higginbotham's second book, Shades of Freedom: Racial Politics and Presumptions in the American Legal Process was first published by the Oxford University Press in 1996, after his judicial retirement. He also helped University of Pennsylvania law professor Anita Hill and Emma Coleman Jordan publish Race, Gender, and Power in America: The Legacy of the Hill-Thomas Hearings in 1995. Although retired, he delivered over 100 speeches to spur younger generations to continue to fight for racial justice, and during his lifetime received more than 60 honorary degrees from institutions of higher learning.

=== Work in South Africa ===
Higginbotham was involved in the transition to open democratic elections in South Africa. He had visited South Africa in 1982 with other black jurists and had been appalled by the racial oppression he found and analogized to before the American Civil War. After apartheid's demise, Higginbotham consulted with Nelson Mandela and founded the South Africa Free Election (SAFE) Fund. He raised several million dollars to support fair elections in South Africa, and served as one of the international mediators of the first inter-racial elections in South Africa in 1994. After the election, he helped South Africa's newly elected government draft a new constitution.

Nelson Mandela would later say "Judge Higginbotham['s] work and the example he set made a critical contribution to the course of the rule of law in the United States and a difference in the lives of African Americans, and indeed the lives of all Americans. But his influence also crossed borders and inspired many who fought for freedom and equality in other countries.... Judge Higginbotham played an important role in [South Africa's] first democratic elections, support the development of public interest law work in South Africa and helped to create broader opportunities for black South African lawyers."

=== Testimony at Clinton impeachment hearings ===
On December 1, 1998, two weeks before his death, Higginbotham gave testimony before the House Judiciary Committee concerning the issue of what constituted an impeachable offense, as part of the hearings on President Clinton's impeachment. Higginbotham argued that Clinton's conduct did not rise to the level of an impeachable offense. Higginbotham offered a hypothetical scenario of a person driving his car at a speed of 55 miles (89 km)-per-hour in a 50-mile (80 km)-per-hour speed zone, and then falsely testifying under oath that he was only driving 49 miles (79 km)-per-hour. Higginbotham then said,

I submit to you that it would be grossly improper to impeach a President under such a factual scenario, because perjury regarding a 55 mile per-hour traffic offense does not rise to the level of 'Treason, Bribery, or other high Crimes and Misdemeanors' about which the framers were concerned when they drafted Article II. Is perjury about a traffic offense different than perjury about a sexual matter involving consenting adults? I submit that as to impeachment purposes, there is not a significant substantive difference between the hypothetical traffic offense and the actual sexual incident in this matter. The alleged perjurious statements denying a sexual relationship between the President of the United States and another consenting adult do not rise to the level of constitutional egregiousness that triggers the impeachment clause of Article II."

Higginbotham concluded his testimony, writing, "I submit that your individual vote will have a profound impact on the entire history and future of the United States of America. I would remind you once again of the incisive words of Luther Standing Bear: 'Thought comes before speech.' I pray that this Committee will, in a non-partisan way, rise to its highest potential of statesmanship by giving this issue its calm and insightful thought before speaking and casting a vote that will affect America's rendezvous with destiny."

After Higginbotham's death, Clinton said "I shall never forget how he spoke up for me."

== Death ==
Higginbotham died on December 14, 1998, in Boston, Massachusetts, following a series of strokes. President Clinton described him as "one of our nation's most passionate and steadfast advocates for civil rights." Jesse Jackson said of Higginbotham, "[w]hat Thurgood Marshall and Charles Hamilton Houston were to the first half of this century, Judge Higginbotham was to the second half." Kweisi Mfume said "[t]he world has lost one of its finest, most pre-eminent jurists of our times. His work is a reflection of both his deep passion for civil rights and his legendary pursuit of justice and equality for all Americans."

== Personal life ==
Higginbotham married twice and was survived by his second wife, two sons and two daughters. In August 1948, shortly after graduating from college, he married Jeanne L. Foster, with whom he had three children. That marriage ended in divorce in 1988. He later married Evelyn Brooks Higginbotham, who survived him.

He is the uncle of law professor F. Michael (Mike) Higginbotham of the University of Baltimore School of Law, who co-authored works with his uncle, and who has published open letters to a number of important figures in his late uncle's voice.

== Awards and honors ==
Higginbotham was elected to the American Philosophical Society in 1978 and the American Academy of Arts and Sciences in 1993. President Clinton awarded him the Presidential Medal of Freedom in 1995. In 1996, the NAACP award him its highest honor, the Spingarn Medal. Higginbotham received the first Spirit of Raoul Wallenberg Humanitarian Award in 1994 from the American Swedish Historical Museum on the basis of his advocacy on behalf of America's children within the legal profession and his human rights efforts in South Africa. The Lawyers' Committee for Civil Rights Under Law named its annual A. Leon Higginbotham Corporate Leadership Award after Judge Higginbotham. Higginbotham was awarded honorary degrees from 62 different universities.

== See also ==
- List of African-American federal judges
- List of African-American jurists
- List of first minority male lawyers and judges in Pennsylvania

== Bibliography ==
- In the Matter of Color: The Colonial Period (1978) ISBN 0-19-502745-0
- Shades of Freedom: Racial Politics and Presumptions of the American Legal Process (1996) ISBN 0-19-512288-7

Legal offices
| Preceded by James Cullen Ganey | Judge of the United States District Court for the Eastern District of Pennsylvania; 1964–1977 | Succeeded by Louis H. Pollak |
| Preceded by Francis Lund Van Dusen | Judge of the United States Court of Appeals for the Third Circuit; 1977–1991 | Succeeded by Theodore McKee |
| Preceded by Seat established | Presiding Judge on the United States Foreign Intelligence Surveillance Court of Review; 1979–1986 | Succeeded by Collins J. Seitz |
| Preceded by John Joseph Gibbons | Chief Judge of the United States Court of Appeals for the Third Circuit; 1990–1991 | Succeeded by Dolores Sloviter |
