= Temple International and Comparative Law Journal =

- Discipline: Law
- Language: English

Publication details
- History: 1985-present
- Frequency: Biannually

Standard abbreviations
- Bluebook: Temp. Int'l & Comp. L.J.
- ISO 4: Temple Int. Comp. Law J.

Indexing
- ISSN: 0889-1915
- OCLC no.: 818994023

Links
- Journal homepage

The Temple International and Comparative Law Journal is a law journal published by an independent student group at Temple University Beasley School of Law. The journal was established in 1985 by Henry Richardson III. Since 1987, the journal has continuously published two times per year, in Fall and Spring. The Fall issue contains student-written notes and comments, and the Spring issue is composed of articles, essays, and book reviews by professional legal scholars.
