= Brooklawn (West Marlborough Township, Chester County, Pennsylvania) =

Historic house in Chester County, Pennsylvania, U.S.

- U.S. National Register of Historic Places
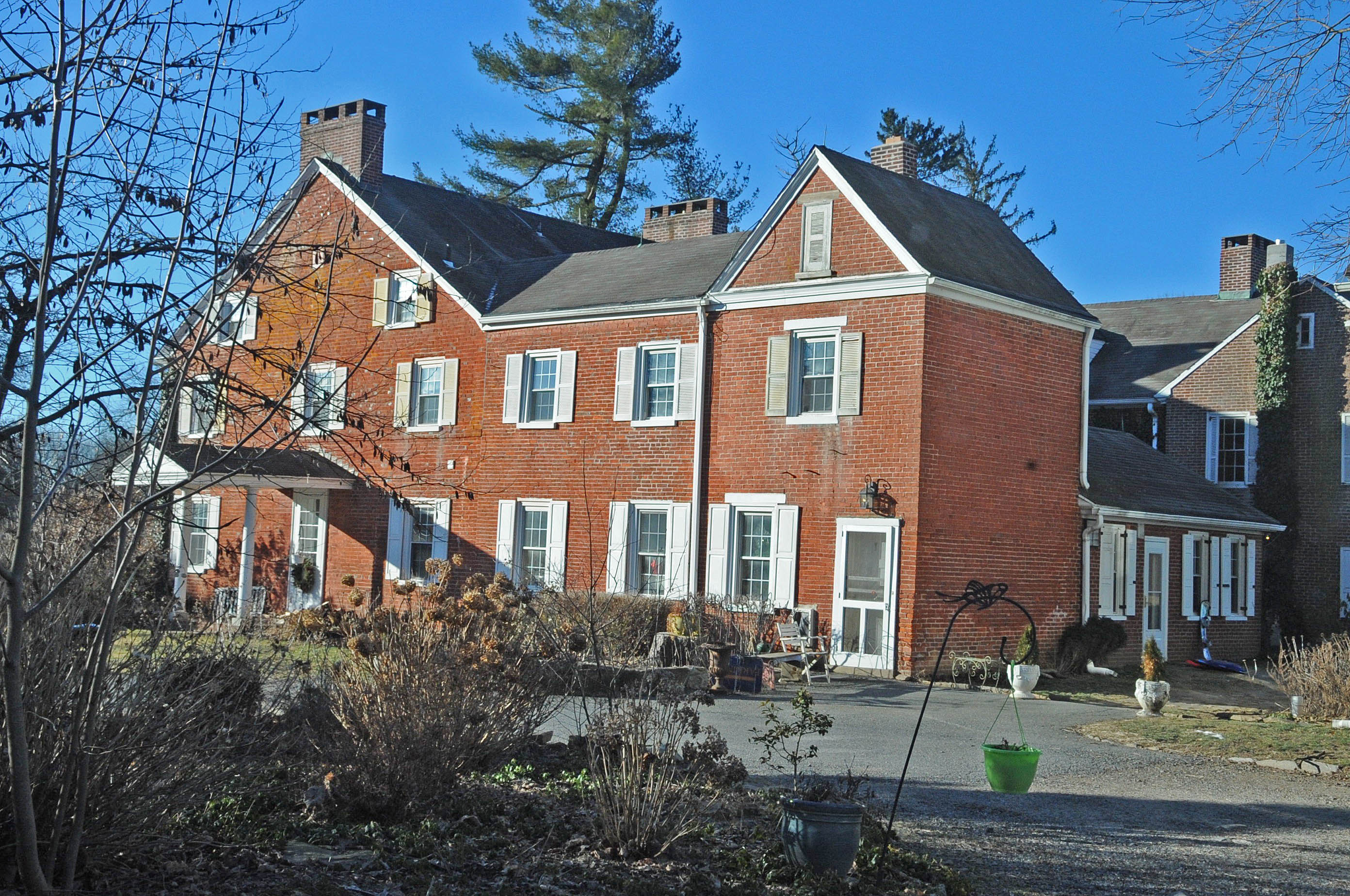

- Location within Pennsylvania Location within the United States
- Location: 1825 Newark Road, West Marlborough Township, Chester County, Pennsylvania, U.S.
- Coordinates: 39.8971°N 75.7814°W
- NRHP reference No.: 100006433
- Added to NRHP: January 24, 2022

Brooklawn is a historic house located on 1825 Newark Road in West Marlborough Township, Chester County, in the U.S. state of Pennsylvania. A red-brick Federal-style mansion of architectural significance, it was listed on the National Register of Historic Places on January 24, 2022.

== Description and history ==
Brooklawn is a 40.9-acre country estate set amid rolling hills, pastures, and woodlands. A red-brick Federal-style mansion dating to the 1680s is the primary feature of the estate. Philadelphia-based architect Arthur Ingersoll Meigs designed an extension to the mansion in 1931 (hence its NRHP architectural significance) and added a spring house, servants' quarters, and garage. A low stone wall parallels Newark Road.

Brooklawn was the home of U.S. district court judge John Hannum (1915–2007) and his wife, Nancy Penn Smith Hannum (1919–2010), who served as master of foxhounds for Stewart's Cheshire Hunt for decades and was a prominent Chester County conservationist. The estate had been home to Nancy Hannum since her stepfather, investment banker W. Plunket Stewart, purchased the estate in the early 1900s.

Equestrian scenes in the 1964 Alfred Hitchcock film Marnie were filmed at Brooklawn.
