= John Berne Hannum =

American judge

Senior Judge of the United States District Court for the Eastern District of Pennsylvania
- In office May 29, 1984 – April 23, 2007

Judge of the United States District Court for the Eastern District of Pennsylvania
- In office May 6, 1969 – May 29, 1984
- Appointed by: Richard Nixon
- Preceded by: Francis Lund Van Dusen
- Succeeded by: Anthony Joseph Scirica

Personal details
- Born: John Berne Hannum; March 19, 1915 Chester, Pennsylvania, U.S.
- Died: April 23, 2007 (aged 92) Unionville, Pennsylvania, U.S.
- Education: Dickinson School of Law (LL.B.)

John Berne Hannum (March 19, 1915 – April 23, 2007) was a United States district judge of the United States District Court for the Eastern District of Pennsylvania.

== Education and career ==
Born in Chester, Pennsylvania, Hannum received a Bachelor of Laws from Dickinson School of Law (now Pennsylvania State University - Dickinson Law) in 1941. He was in private practice in Chester from 1941 to 1942, and was then a United States Naval Reserve Lieutenant during World War II, from 1942 to 1946, returning to private practice in Chester from 1946 to 1949. He was in private practice in Philadelphia, Pennsylvania from 1949 to 1968. He was then a judge of the Superior Court of Pennsylvania from 1968 to 1969.

== Federal judicial service ==
On March 24, 1969, Hannum was nominated by President Richard Nixon to a seat on the United States District Court for the Eastern District of Pennsylvania vacated by Judge Francis Lund Van Dusen. Hannum was confirmed by the United States Senate on May 5, 1969, and received his commission on May 6, 1969. He assumed senior status on May 29, 1984. Hannum served in that capacity until his death on April 23, 2007, in Unionville, Chester County, Pennsylvania.

== Notable case ==
A notable sentencing by Hannum was that of George Martorano. In 1984, Hannum sentenced Martorano to life in prison without parole after Martorano pleaded guilty to 19 counts of drug possession and distribution. The length of this sentence has led to criticism of Hannum's. Martorano was released in October 2015 after serving over 32 years of the longest prison term ever imposed on a first-time non-violent offender in American history.

== Personal life ==
Hannum was married to Nancy Penn Smith Hannum (1919–2010), a socialite and conservationist who was master of foxhounds for Stewart's Cheshire Hunt for decades. The couple lived at Brooklawn, a historic house inherited by Nancy from her stepfather, investment banker W. Plunket Stewart.

== Sources ==
Legal offices
Preceded by Francis Lund Van Dusen	Judge of the United States District Court for the Eastern District of Pennsylvania; 1969–1984	Succeeded by Anthony Joseph Scirica
