= Marjorie Rendell =

American judge (born 1947)

Midge Rendell
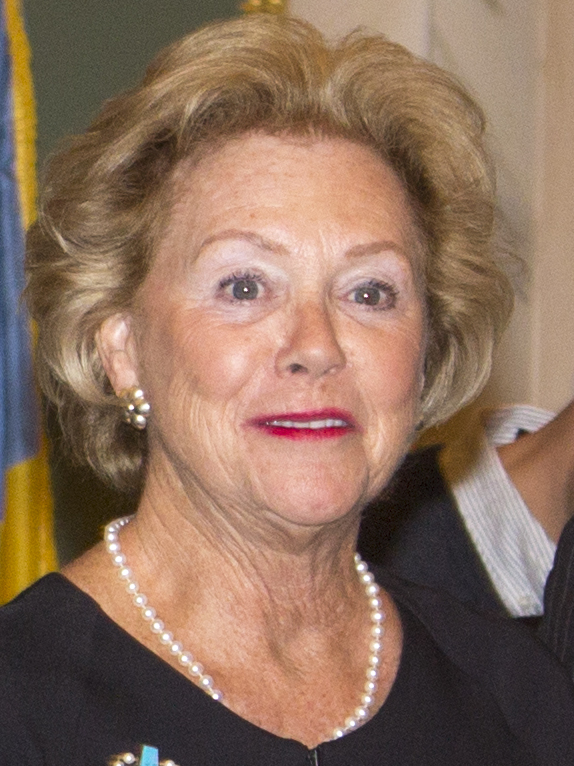
- Rendell in 2016

Senior Judge of the United States Court of Appeals for the Third Circuit
- Incumbent
- Assumed office July 1, 2015

First Lady of Pennsylvania
- In role January 21, 2003 – January 18, 2011
- Governor: Ed Rendell
- Preceded by: Katherine Schweiker
- Succeeded by: Susan Corbett

Judge of the United States Court of Appeals for the Third Circuit
- In office September 29, 1997 – July 1, 2015
- Appointed by: Bill Clinton
- Preceded by: William D. Hutchinson
- Succeeded by: Stephanos Bibas

Judge of the United States District Court for the Eastern District of Pennsylvania
- In office February 11, 1994 – November 20, 1997
- Appointed by: Bill Clinton
- Preceded by: Louis Bechtle
- Succeeded by: Seat abolished

Personal details
- Born: Marjorie May Osterlund; December 20, 1947 (age 78) Wilmington, Delaware, U.S.
- Spouses: Ed Rendell (m. 1971; div. 2016); Arthur Tilson (m. 2017)
- Education: University of Pennsylvania (BA); Villanova University (JD)

Marjorie May "Midge" Rendell (née Osterlund; born December 20, 1947) is an American attorney and jurist serving as a Senior United States circuit judge of the United States Court of Appeals for the Third Circuit and a former First Lady of Pennsylvania. In 2003, she was named to the PoliticsPA list of "Pennsylvania's Most Politically Powerful Women".

== Early life and education ==
Rendell was born in Wilmington, Delaware. Her father was employed as a DuPont executive and she attended Ursuline Academy. She received a Bachelor of Arts degree, cum laude, from the University of Pennsylvania in 1969 and a Juris Doctor from the Villanova University School of Law in 1973.

== Career ==
=== Private practice ===
After graduating from law school, she practiced as an attorney for 20 years as a partner at the Philadelphia firm of Duane, Morris & Heckscher, where she focused her practice on bankruptcy and commercial litigation. She also served as a mediator for the United States District Court.

While in private practice, Rendell experienced sexism originating from both her clients and cohorts. At times, she was called "honey" by her male colleagues and would hide or downplay the existence of her then young son.

=== Federal judicial service ===
Rendell was nominated by President Bill Clinton on November 19, 1993, to a seat on the United States District Court for the Eastern District of Pennsylvania vacated by Judge Louis Bechtle. She was confirmed by the United States Senate on February 10, 1994, and received commission on February 11, 1994. Her service terminated on November 20, 1997, due to elevation to the court of appeals.

Rendell was nominated by President Clinton on January 7, 1997, to a seat on the United States Court of Appeals for the Third Circuit vacated by Judge William D. Hutchinson. She was confirmed by the Senate on September 26, 1997, and received commission on September 29, 1997. She assumed senior status on July 1, 2015.

=== Notable case ===
In 2008, Rendell served as a part of a three-judge panel that overturned the Federal Communications Commission's indecency fine against CBS related to the Super Bowl XXXVIII halftime show controversy.

== Philanthropy ==
In 1993, Rendell founded and managed Avenue of the Arts, Inc., whose purpose was to develop Philadelphia's Broad Street into a world-class artistic venue. She currently serves as one of the members of the board of directors. She is also a trustee of the University of Pennsylvania.

== Family ==
She married Ed Rendell, a future Governor of Pennsylvania, in 1971. On January 21, 2003, Judge Rendell administered the oath of office to her husband after he won the gubernatorial election in November 2002. During her husband's campaigns for mayor and governor, Rendell was barred by the federal judicial ethics code from publicly campaigning on his behalf, as well as from taking part in some fundraisers. On February 7, 2011, a joint email from the couple announced that they had amicably separated. They have one adult son, Jesse. On September 6, 2016, Ed Rendell announced the couple had filed for amicable divorce. In September 2017, Judge Rendell married Arthur Tilson, a senior judge on the Montgomery County, Pennsylvania Court of Common Pleas.

Legal offices
Preceded by Louis Bechtle	Judge of the United States District Court for the Eastern District of Pennsylvania; 1994–1997	Seat abolished
Preceded by William D. Hutchinson	Judge of the United States Court of Appeals for the Third Circuit; 1997–2015	Succeeded by Stephanos Bibas
Honorary titles
Preceded by Katherine Schweiker	First Lady of Pennsylvania; 2003–2011	Succeeded by Susan Corbett
