= Francis Lund Van Dusen =

American judge (1912–1993)

Senior Judge of the United States Court of Appeals for the Third Circuit
- In office May 16, 1977 – May 26, 1993

Judge of the United States Court of Appeals for the Third Circuit
- In office June 12, 1967 – May 16, 1977
- Appointed by: Lyndon B. Johnson
- Preceded by: James Cullen Ganey
- Succeeded by: A. Leon Higginbotham Jr.

Judge of the United States District Court for the Eastern District of Pennsylvania
- In office August 1, 1955 – June 26, 1967
- Appointed by: Dwight D. Eisenhower
- Preceded by: Guy K. Bard
- Succeeded by: John Berne Hannum

Personal details
- Born: Francis Lund Van Dusen; May 16, 1912 Philadelphia, Pennsylvania, U.S.
- Died: May 26, 1993 (aged 81) Bryn Mawr, Pennsylvania, U.S.
- Education: Princeton University (AB); Harvard Law School (LLB)

Francis Lund Van Dusen (May 16, 1912 – May 26, 1993) was a United States circuit judge of the United States Court of Appeals for the Third Circuit and previously was a United States district judge of the United States District Court for the Eastern District of Pennsylvania.

== Education and career ==
Born on May 16, 1912, in Philadelphia, Van Dusen received a B.A. degree from Princeton University in 1934 and an LL.B. degree from Harvard Law School in 1937. He was in private practice in Philadelphia from 1937 to 1941. During World War II, he became an attorney in the Office of the Administrator of Export Control in Washington, D.C. in 1941, and then a senior attorney of the Office of Production Management and later the War Production Board in Washington, D.C. from 1941 to 1942. He was a Lieutenant Commander in the United States Navy from 1942 to 1945. He thereafter returned to private practice in Philadelphia until 1955.

== Federal judicial service ==
Van Dusen was nominated by President Dwight D. Eisenhower on March 20, 1955, to a seat on the United States District Court for the Eastern District of Pennsylvania vacated by Judge Guy K. Bard. He was confirmed by the United States Senate on July 29, 1955, and received his commission on August 1, 1955. His service was terminated on June 26, 1967, due to elevation to the Third Circuit.

Van Dusen was nominated by President Lyndon B. Johnson on January 16, 1967, to a seat on the United States Court of Appeals for the Third Circuit vacated by Judge James Cullen Ganey. He was confirmed by the Senate on June 12, 1967, and received his commission the same day. He assumed senior status on May 16, 1977. His service was terminated on May 26, 1993, due to his death in Bryn Mawr, Pennsylvania, at age 81.

== Sources ==
Legal offices
Preceded by Guy K. Bard	Judge of the United States District Court for the Eastern District of Pennsylvania; 1955–1967	Succeeded by John Berne Hannum
Preceded by James Cullen Ganey	Judge of the United States Court of Appeals for the Third Circuit; 1967–1977	Succeeded by A. Leon Higginbotham Jr.
