= Oliver Booth Dickinson =

American judge

Judge of the United States District Court for the Eastern District of Pennsylvania
- In office April 28, 1914 – September 16, 1939
- Appointed by: Woodrow Wilson
- Preceded by: Seat established by 38 Stat. 283
- Succeeded by: Guy K. Bard

Personal details
- Born: Oliver Booth Dickinson; September 25, 1857 Dayton, Ohio
- Died: September 16, 1939 (aged 81)
- Education: Bucknell University (A.M.) read law

Oliver Booth Dickinson (September 25, 1857 – September 16, 1939) was a United States district judge of the United States District Court for the Eastern District of Pennsylvania.

== Education and career ==
Born in Dayton, Ohio, Dickinson graduated from Bucknell University in 1877 and read law in 1878. He received an Artium Magister degree from Bucknell University in 1903. He was in private practice in Chester, Pennsylvania from 1878 to 1914.

== Federal judicial service ==
On March 31, 1914, Dickinson was nominated by President Woodrow Wilson to a new seat on the United States District Court for the Eastern District of Pennsylvania created by 38 Stat. 283. He was confirmed by the United States Senate on April 28, 1914, and received his commission the same day, serving thereafter until his death on September 16, 1939.

== Sources ==
Legal offices
Preceded by Seat established by 38 Stat. 283	Judge of the United States District Court for the Eastern District of Pennsylvania; 1914–1939	Succeeded by Guy K. Bard
