= Clifford Scott Green =

American judge (1923-2007)

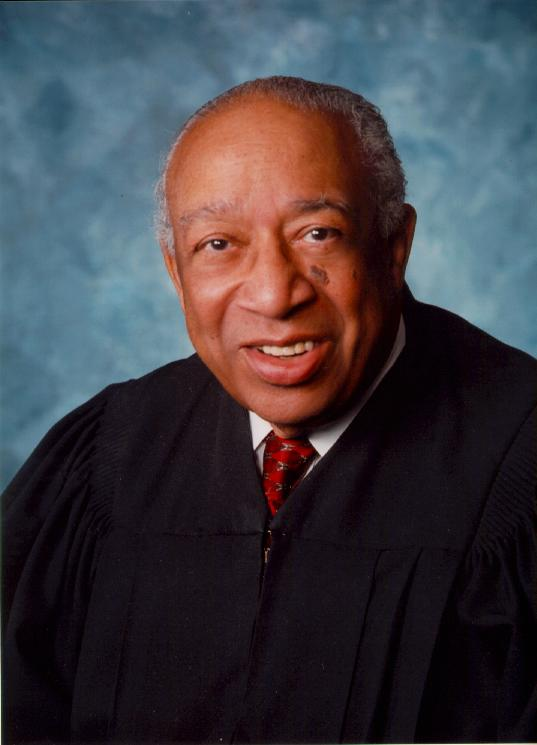
- Official Portrait of Judge Green

Senior Judge of the United States District Court for the Eastern District of Pennsylvania
- In office April 2, 1988 – May 31, 2007

Judge of the United States District Court for the Eastern District of Pennsylvania
- In office December 9, 1971 – April 2, 1988
- Appointed by: Richard Nixon
- Preceded by: Harold Kenneth Wood
- Succeeded by: Jan E. DuBois

Personal details
- Born: Clifford Scott Green; April 2, 1923 Philadelphia, Pennsylvania, U.S.
- Died: May 31, 2007 (aged 84) Philadelphia, Pennsylvania, U.S.
- Resting place: West Laurel Hill Cemetery, Bala Cynwyd, Pennsylvania, U.S.
- Education: Temple University (BS, JD)

Clifford Scott Green (April 2, 1923 – May 31, 2007) was a United States district judge of the United States District Court for the Eastern District of Pennsylvania. Green was the eighteenth African-American Article III judge appointed in the United States, and the second African-American judge on the United States District Court for the Eastern District of Pennsylvania. During his 36 years on the federal bench Judge Green presided over a number of notable cases, and was regarded as one of the most popular judges in the district.

== Early life and education ==
Green was born on April 2, 1923, in Philadelphia, Pennsylvania. His father, Robert Lewis Green, had come to the United States from St. Thomas island in the U.S. Virgin Islands. Green attended West Philadelphia High School, graduating in 1941. He initially did consider going to college, and instended instead to go immediately to work. From 1941 to 1942 he worked in a Philadelphia restaurant and at a drug manufacturing company. In 1942 he took a job with the United States Army Signal Corps.

In 1943, Green enlisted in the United States Army Air Corps, the predecessor to the United States Air Force. At the time, the armed forces were still segregated. Green was initially optimistic that the military was going to be a good life, until his unit was shipped from Fort Lee, Virginia, to Keesler Field (now Keesler Air Force Base), in Mississippi. When the unit arrived at Keesler they were driven past the barracks to what Green would later describe as "a tent city." It was then that Green "realized for real that I was really in a segregated army, and there was always, as long as I was in the service, two standards, one quite unacceptable and the other as acceptable as could be considering the fact that the country was at war."

Green served from 1943 to 1946, rising to the rank of Sergeant. He returned to Philadelphia in March 1946, intending to use the benefits of the G.I. Bill to attend Drexel University. He planned to major in electrical engineering, which was the field he had worked in during his time in the Army. Drexel did not have classes starting until September, so Green began to look to work. While seeking employment at Temple University Green learned that Temple had classes beginning in two weeks, so he decided to enroll there.

Green entered the School of Business as an economics major, and planned to become a certified public accountant, until an adviser told him that there were no jobs available for African-American accountants in Philadelphia. Green decided to pursue a career in law, something his father had dreamed of doing himself.

Green received a B.S. in economics in 1948, finishing his undergraduate degree in just over two years and graduating with honors. He enrolled at Temple Law School as one of ten black students, of whom two would ultimately graduate (the other graduate, Larry Perkins, would also go on to become a judge). While in law school Green was a member of the moot court team and the law review. He competed on a moot court team which won the Philadelphia regional of the American Bar Association competition. At the national competition, Green's team faced the Yale moot court team, which included his future law partner and judicial colleague A. Leon Higginbotham, Jr. In 1951 Green received his LL.B. with honors, graduating in the top three of his class. He was also awarded graduation prizes for receiving the highest grades in constitutional law and conflicts of law.

After law school, Green became involved in politics as was a Republican ward leader for the 44th Ward in West Philadelphia. He ran for city council and municipal court but was unsuccessful.

== Legal career ==
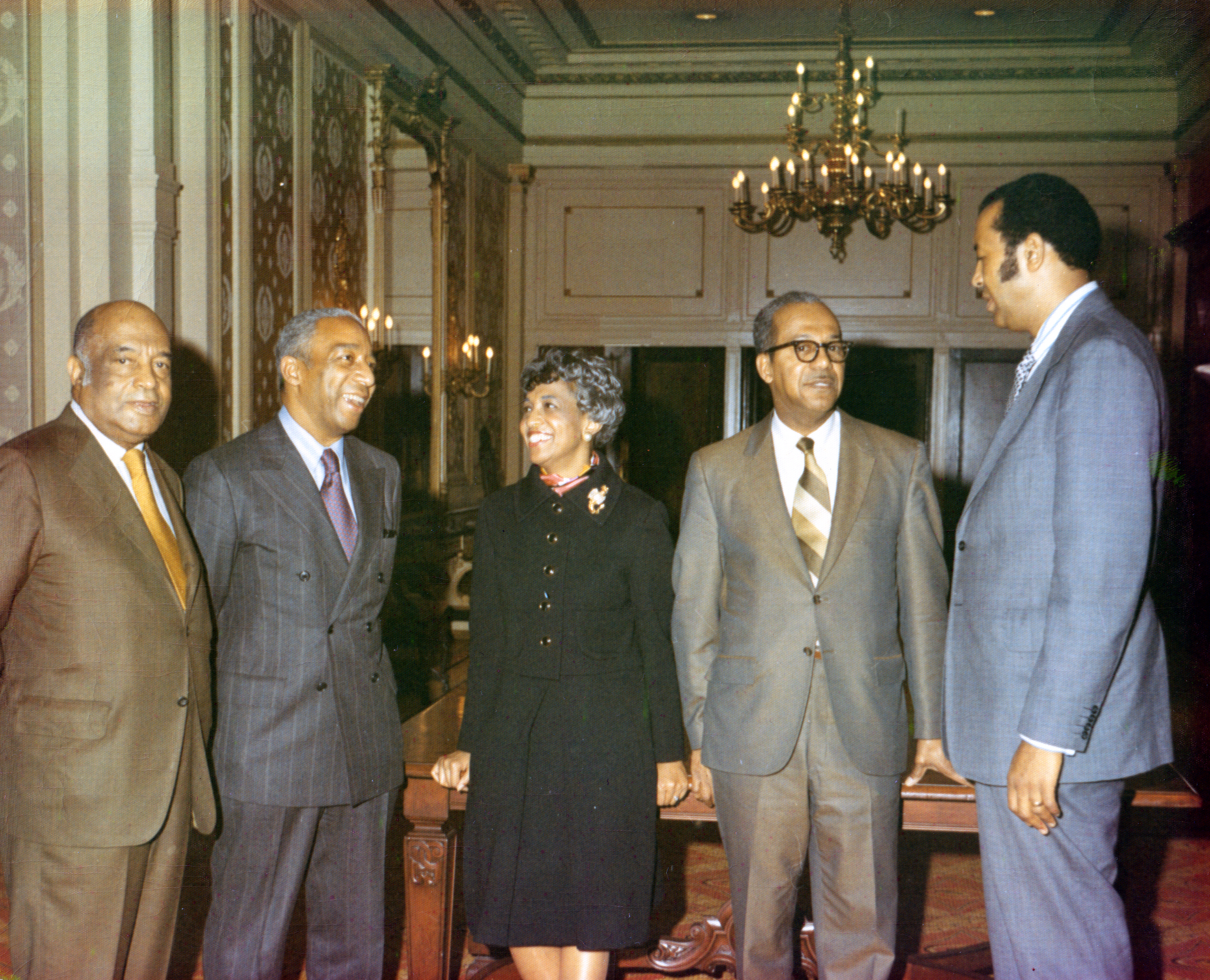
Judge Green (second from the left) with his former law partners at his swearing in

Green passed the Pennsylvania bar exam in 1951, achieving the highest score in the state. Green's early mentors included Robert N.C. Nix, Sr., who lived across the street from Green's family. In January 1952, after being admitted to the bar, Green took over the practice of Thomas Reed, a black Philadelphia lawyer who was joining the Philadelphia District Attorney's Office under Richardson Dilworth (Green had also interviewed at the DA's office, but decided that he "couldn't fit in as a prosecutor").

Green worked as a solo practitioner until March 1952, when he entered into a partnership with Harvey Schmidt. The firm was known as Schmidt and Green until 1954, when Doris M. Harris and A. Leon Higginbotham joined as partners. In 1955 J. Austin Norris, a prominent African-American political figure, joined the firm, which was then known as Norris, Schmidt, Green, Harris, & Higginbotham. The firm was the first African-American law firm in Philadelphia. The firm, which never numbered more than a dozen lawyers at a given time, produced four federal judges; Higginbotham, Green, and Herbert Hutton all served on the District Court (Higginbotham was later elevated to the Third Circuit), and William Hall was the first African American appointed as a federal magistrate judge. In addition, two members of the firm, Dorris Harris and Harvey Schmidt, were elected judges of the Philadelphia Court of Common Pleas, and William Brown was appointed by President Nixon to be chair of the Equal Employment Opportunity Commission.

Green's practice while at the firm was diverse. Initially, the firm's practice was primarily criminal defense. As new partners were added, the firm expanded to include civil work, which eventually became the overwhelming majority of the work. Green eventually developed a specialized practice representing churches, including the National Baptist Convention, the African Methodist Episcopal Church, the Church of Our Lord Jesus Christ of the Apostolic Faith, and Father Divine. Additionally, Green represented parties both before and after the Supreme Court's decision in Brown v. Board of Education in an attempt to integrate both the student and teacher populations in area school districts. He remained with the firm until his appointment to the bench.

Green first entered public service as a special deputy commonwealth attorney general from 1954 to 1955. He was assigned as counsel for the Director of the Bureau of Workman's Compensation. In addition to representing the Director, Green was also responsible for approving all claims for compensation under the occupational disease statute whenever the Commonwealth was involved. In 1954 Green unsuccessfully ran for the Republican nomination for Philadelphia City Council.

== Judicial career ==
Green was initially hesitant about seeking a position on the bench because he enjoyed the practice of law. Nevertheless, he began to seek an appointment to the state court in the late 1950s.

In 1962 Green joined with a group of Republican ward leaders who broke off from the main party, which was led by Sheriff Austin Meehan, to support Governor William Scranton. All of the other ward leaders were voted out of office, and although Green retained his position Sheriff Meehan told him that he would no longer support his appointment to the bench.

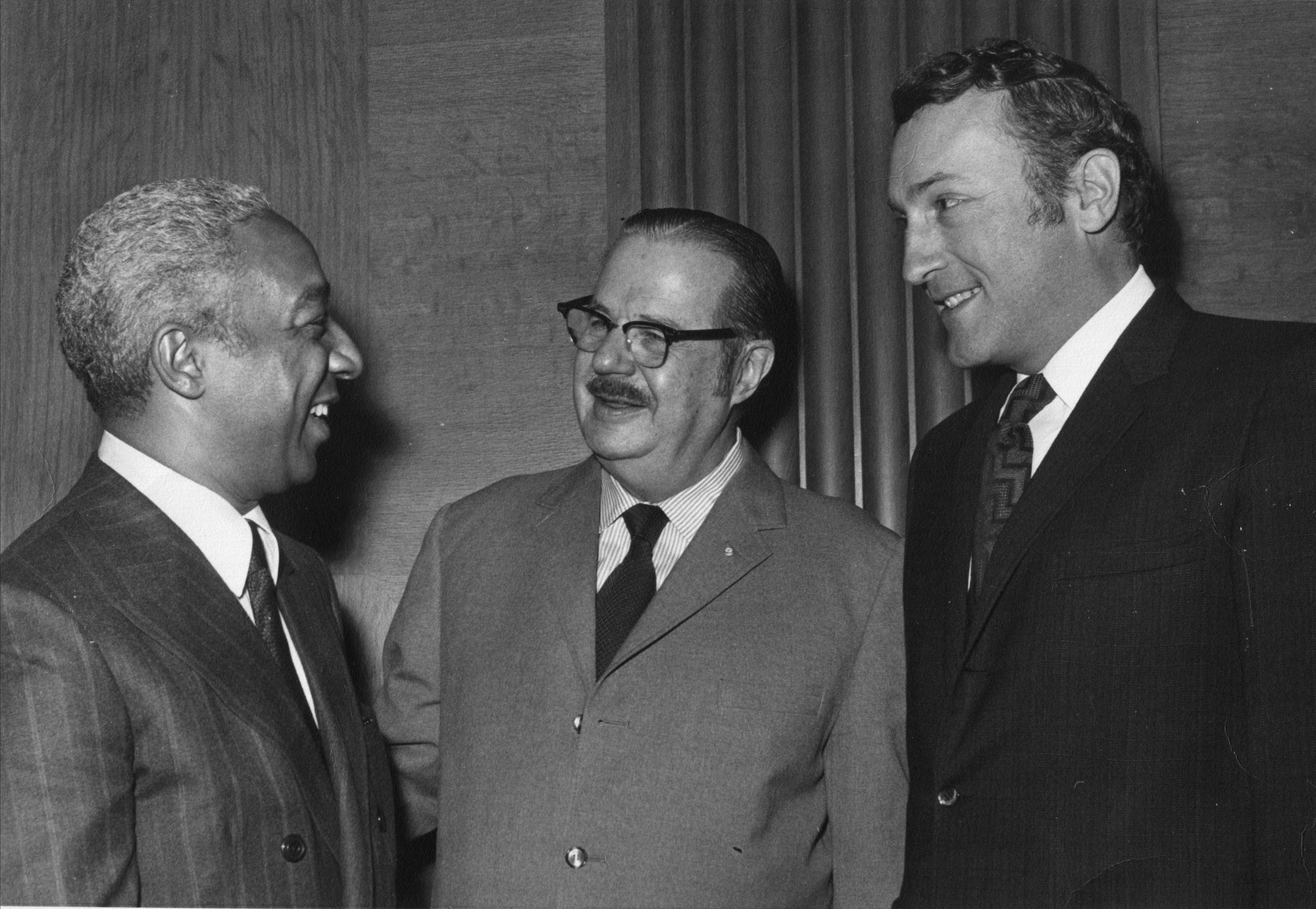
Judge Green with Senators Hugh Scott and Richard Schweiker

Green, however, had the support of Bernard G. Segal, who was then Chancellor of the Philadelphia Bar Association, his former law partner Austin Norris, and the Chancellor of Temple University Robert Johnson. Segal was appointed by Governor Scranton to head a merit commission to select nominees for the state court positions. In addition, Green was endorsed by newspapers across the state.

Scranton ultimately did appoint Green as a judge on the Court of Common Pleas of Philadelphia in 1964. He was elected to a full term in the next general election. Green served primarily as a juvenile court judge while in state court.

In 1971 a vacancy was created on the District Court for the Eastern District of Pennsylvania when Judge Harold K. Wood assumed senior status. Senator Hugh Scott supported Green to fill the position. Green also had the support of Billy Meehan, the son of Sheriff Austin Meehan, and at the time the head of the Philadelphia Republican Committee. President Nixon nominated Green on December 1, 1971, and he was confirmed by the United States Senate on December 4, receiving his commission on December 9. In 1984 Green declined a seat on the United States Court of Appeals for the Third Circuit, citing "the joy his district court job provided him and [the] numerous friendships he enjoyed there." He assumed senior status on April 2, 1988, and continued serving in that capacity until his death.

Throughout his time on the bench, Green remained a popular judge; a 1994 survey of Philadelphia lawyers concluded "Green is the most well-liked judge on the bench, and attorneys could not praise him enough for his wonderful demeanor."

=== Notable cases ===
Judge Green presided over a number of notable cases during his 35-year tenure on the Eastern District. In Bolden v. Pennsylvania State Police Judge Green ordered the Pennsylvania State Police to reinstate William Bolden, a minority trooper who had been dismissed. The case, which began in 1973, resulted in a consent decree that required the State Police to hire one minority for every non-minority hired, and set additional goals for promotion and retention of minority troopers. Judge Green presided over the consent decree for 25 years, dissolving it in 1999. The case was credited with helping to abolish racism in the hiring of troopers, and integrate the State Police.

In 1981 Judge Green threw out the fraud conviction of Pennsylvania State Senator Vincent Fumo, concluding that the government had failed to prove that Fumo and two others were involved in a single scheme to pad state payrolls with ghost workers as alleged in their indictment. The decision was upheld on appeal to the United States Court of Appeals for the Third Circuit.

== Awards and honors ==
Judge Green was the first recipient of the NAACP's William H. Hastie award in 1985. He was awarded the Spirit of Excellence award by the American Bar Association in 2002. The Philadelphia chapter of the Judicial Council of the National Bar Association is named in Judge Green's honor. The Criminal Law Committee of the Federal Bar Association's Philadelphia Chapter gives a Clifford Scott Green Bill of Rights Award at its biennial dinner event. Judge Green was a lifetime trustee of Temple University, and a former member of the Board of Trustees of Philadelphia State Hospital, and Children's Hospital of Philadelphia.

== Death ==
Judge Green suffered a cerebral hemorrhage and died of pneumonia in Philadelphia on May 31, 2007. He was interred at West Laurel Hill Cemetery in Bala Cynwyd, Pennsylvania. He was survived by his wife, daughter and grand-daughter.

== Legacy ==
In 1999, Temple University Beasley School of Law established the Honorable Clifford Scott Green scholarship to assist Temple students committed to public interest law. In 2003, Temple University Beasley School of Law established The Honorable Clifford Scott Green Lectureship.

== See also ==
- List of African-American jurists
- List of African-American federal judges

Legal offices
Preceded by Harold Kenneth Wood	Judge of the United States District Court for the Eastern District of Pennsylvania; 1971–1988	Succeeded by Jan E. DuBois
