= Rachel Rebouché =

American attorney and reproductive law scholar

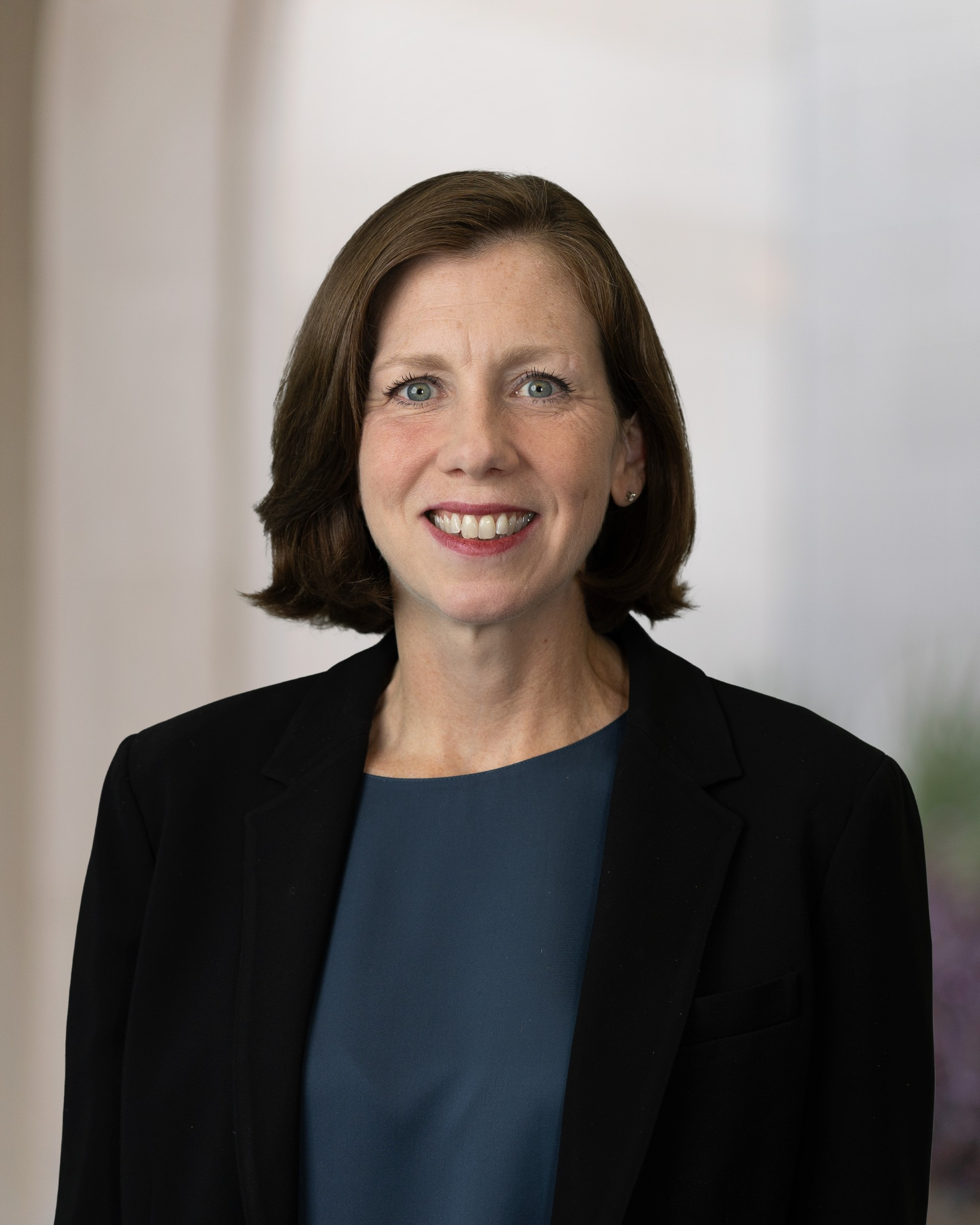
- Rebouché at the University of Texas School of Law
- Born: Texas, U.S.
- Education: Trinity University, Texas (BA); Queen's University Belfast (LLM); Harvard University (JD)
- Awards: Harry S. Truman Scholarship; George J. Mitchell Scholarship
- Scientific career
- Fields: Reproductive law
- Workplaces: Northern Ireland Human Rights Commission; University of Florida Levin College of Law; Temple University Beasley School of Law

Rachel Rebouché is a U.S. attorney and reproductive law scholar. She is the G. Rollie White Chair in Law and a Professor of Law at The University of Texas School of Law. Before joining Texas Law, she served as the Kean Family Dean and Peter J. Liacouras Professor of Law and at the Beasley School of Law at Temple University in Philadelphia.

== Early life and education ==
Rebouché was born in Texas and pursued a B.A. from Trinity University in sociology and political science graduating in 1999. Rebouché then obtained her LL.M. in International Human Rights Law from Queen’s University Belfast in 2001.

After her LL.M., Rebouché became a researcher at the Northern Ireland Human Rights Commission and subsequently the Human Rights Centre at Queen’s University, Belfast. Rebouché returned to the United States and attended Harvard Law School, graduating in 2006. During her time at Harvard, she was the editor–in–chief of Harvard Journal of Law and Gender and won the Dean's Award for Community Service.

== Career and research ==
Rebouché clerked for Justice Kate O’Regan on the Constitutional Court of South Africa. After her clerkship, Rebouché became a fellow of Women’s Law and Public Policy at the National Women’s Law Center in Washington D.C. While in D.C., Rebouché was also the associate director of Adolescent Health Programs at the National Partnership for Women and Families, a position she held until she was appointed assistant professor at the University of Florida Levin College of Law.

In 2013, Rebouché joined the faculty at Temple University Beasley School of Law. In August 2021, Rebouché became the dean of the law school, after her role as Beasley’s associate dean of research. In 2026, Rebouché joined the faculty at Texas Law and serves as the Faculty Lead for the Sissy Farenthold Reproductive Justice Defense Project. She is an author of two casebooks, one on family law and the other on contract law, and numerous scholarly articles.
