= Gerald A. Gleeson =

American jurist and government official (1901–1981)

Pennsylvania Secretary of Revenue
- In office 1955–1958
- Governor: George M. Leader
- Preceded by: Otto F. Messner
- Succeeded by: Vincent G. Panati

United States Attorney for the Eastern District of Pennsylvania
- In office 1940–1953
- President: Franklin D. Roosevelt; Harry S. Truman
- Preceded by: James Cullen Ganey
- Succeeded by: W. Wilson White

Personal details
- Born: November 8, 1901 Philadelphia, Pennsylvania, U.S.
- Died: July 12, 1981 (aged 79) Bryn Mawr, Pennsylvania, U.S.
- Party: Democratic

Gerald Anthony Gleeson (November 8, 1901 – July 12, 1981) was an American jurist and government official who was the United States Attorney for the Eastern District of Pennsylvania from 1940 to 1953, Pennsylvania Secretary of Revenue from 1955 to 1958, and judge of the court of common pleas of Philadelphia from 1958 to 1976.

== Early life ==
Gleeson was born on November 8, 1901, in Philadelphia to Timothy and Margaret (Murphy) Gleeson. He graduated from Roman Catholic High School and the University of Pennsylvania.

== Career ==
Gleeson graduated from the University of Pennsylvania Law School in 1926 and entered into legal practice with Thomas D. McBride. In 1934, he became an assistant United States attorney for the Eastern District of Pennsylvania. He left the office to unsuccessfully run for Sheriff of Philadelphia in 1940.

When U.S. attorney James Cullen Ganey was appointed to a judgeship on the United States District Court in 1940, Gleeson was appointed by President Franklin D. Roosevelt to succeed him. During Gleeson's tenure, Philadelphia's U.S. attorney's office successfully prosecuted Harry Gold for espionage and Billie Holiday on narcotics charges. He remained in office until Dwight D. Eisenhower became president in 1953. From 1953 to 1955, Gleeson worked in private practice and was a member of Philadelphia's board of revision of taxes.

On December 22, 1954, Governor-elect George M. Leader announced Gleeson as his Secretary of Revenue, citing his exception ability as an administrator and "long experience in tax and revenue matters". On January 14, 1958, Leader appointed Gleeson to fill James C. Crumlish Sr.'s seat on the court of common pleas of Philadelphia. He remained on the bench until his retirement in 1976.

== Personal life and death ==
On June 19, 1933, Gleeson married Geraldine Cecilia Heck. They had three children.

Gleeson served as president of the Friendly Sons of St. Patrick and state advocate of the Pennsylvania Knights of Columbus. He was a governor of the Chapel of the Four Chaplains and trustee of Holy Family College. For his community service, Gleeson was made a Knight of Malta by Pope Paul VI.

Gleeson died on July 12, 1981, at the Bryn Mawr Terrace Convalescent Center.
