= John W. Lord Jr. =

American judge

Senior Judge of the United States District Court for the Eastern District of Pennsylvania
- In office December 19, 1971 – May 16, 1972

Chief Judge of the United States District Court for the Eastern District of Pennsylvania
- In office 1969–1971
- Preceded by: Thomas James Clary
- Succeeded by: Joseph Simon Lord III

Judge of the United States District Court for the Eastern District of Pennsylvania
- In office May 20, 1954 – December 19, 1971
- Appointed by: Dwight D. Eisenhower
- Preceded by: James P. McGranery
- Succeeded by: Louis Bechtle

Member of the Philadelphia City Council
- In office 1952–1954

Member of the Pennsylvania Senate for the 6th district
- In office 1947–1951
- Preceded by: George Woodward
- Succeeded by: Martin Silvert

Personal details
- Born: John Whitaker Lord Jr. December 19, 1901 Philadelphia, Pennsylvania, U.S.
- Died: May 16, 1972 (aged 70)
- Education: Temple University Beasley School of Law (LLB)

John Whitaker Lord Jr. (December 19, 1901 – May 16, 1972) was an American politician and judge from Pennsylvania. He served as a Republican member of the Pennsylvania Senate for the 6th district from 1947 to 1951 and the Philadelphia City Council from 1952 to 1954. He served as a United States district judge of the United States District Court for the Eastern District of Pennsylvania from 1954 until his death in 1972.

== Early life and education ==
Lord was born in the Germantown neighborhood of Philadelphia, Pennsylvania. He graduated from Germantown High School and the University of Pennsylvania. He received a Bachelor of Laws from Temple University Beasley School of Law in 1928.

== Career ==
He entered private practice in 1928 with the firm of Brown and Williams (later White and Williams) and remained associated with them until his elevation to the bench in 1954. Lord also worked as a law professor at Temple University from 1938 to 1954, as well as lecturing on medical jurisprudence at Hahnemann Medical College. He was a deputy state attorney general of Pennsylvania from 1939 to 1946. He served as a Republican member of the Pennsylvania State Senate for the 6th district from 1947 to 1951. In 1951, he was elected as one of seven at-large members of the Philadelphia City Council and served from 1952 to 1954.

== Federal judicial service ==
Lord was nominated by President Dwight D. Eisenhower on March 29, 1954, to a seat on the United States District Court for the Eastern District of Pennsylvania vacated by Judge James P. McGranery. He was confirmed by the United States Senate on May 18, 1954, and received his commission on May 20, 1954. He served as Chief Judge from 1969 to 1971. He assumed senior status on December 19, 1971. Lord served in that capacity until his death on May 16, 1972, after collapsing while attending a Temple Law alumni dinner.

He is interred at the Saint Timothy's Episcopal Church Cemetery in the Roxborough section of Philadelphia, Pennsylvania.

== Sources ==
- "Judge Lord Collapses, Dies At Temple Law Alumni Dinner". Philadelphia Inquirer. May 17, 1972. p. 35 – via Newspapers.com.

Pennsylvania State Senate
Preceded by George Woodward	Member of the Pennsylvania Senate, 6th district 1947-1951	Succeeded by Martin Silvert
Legal offices
Preceded by James P. McGranery	Judge of the United States District Court for the Eastern District of Pennsylvania; 1954–1971	Succeeded by Louis Bechtle
Preceded by Thomas James Clary	Chief Judge of the United States District Court for the Eastern District of Pennsylvania; 1969–1971	Succeeded by Joseph Simon Lord III
