= Temple Law Review =

- Discipline: Law
- Language: English
- Edited by: Brittany Steane

Publication details
- Former name: Temple Law Quarterly
- History: 1927–present
- Publisher: Temple University Beasley School of Law (United States)
- Frequency: Quarterly

Standard abbreviations
- Bluebook: Temp. L. Rev.
- ISO 4: Temple Law Rev.

Links
- Journal homepage

Temple Law Review is a student-edited law review, sponsored by the Temple University Beasley School of Law. The journal is "dedicated to providing a forum for the expression of new legal thought and scholarly commentary on important developments, trends, and issues in the law." Publishing continuously since 1927, Temple Law Review is one of three student journals at Temple University Beasley School of Law. Four issues are printed each year, with the Summer issue traditionally focusing on scholarly materials presented during that year's Symposium. Temple Law Review also publishes Temple Law Review Online, a supplement for "scholarly works that are shorter than the traditional law review article, involve time-sensitive topics, or directly respond to materials published in Temple Law Review's printed issues."

== History ==
The journal was founded in 1927 as the Temple Law Quarterly. In its earliest years, the journal covered a wide variety of legal topics, including constitutional law, international law, and legal ethics, with articles and case notes contributed by both students and practicing lawyers. Temple Law Quarterly scrutinized many twentieth-century developments, publishing articles on patent law's approach to chemical compounds, the consequences of the two World Wars on civil rights and insurance liabilities, the rise of medical malpractice law, and racial discrimination in Pennsylvania Bar admissions. The journal published sixty volumes under the name Temple Law Quarterly, before being renamed the Temple Law Review in 1988.

== Notable review articles ==
- Third Circuit Task Force (2019). "2019 Report of the United States Court of Appeals for the Third Circuit Task Force on Eyewitness Identification" (PDF). Temp. L. Rev. 92 (1): 1.
- Reinstein, Robert J. (2013). "Is the President's Recognition Power Exclusive?" (PDF). Temp. L. Rev. 86 (1): 1.
- Fiss, Owen (2011). "The World We Live In" (PDF). Temp. L. Rev. 83 (2): 295.
- Wood, Honorable Diane P. (2009). "The Changing Face of Diversity Jurisdiction" (PDF). Temp. L. Rev. 82 (3): 593.
- Peterson, Christopher L. (2005). "Federalism and Predatory Lending: Unmasking the Deregulatory Agenda" (PDF). Temp. L. Rev. 78 (1): 1.
- Third Circuit Task Force (2001). "Report on Selection of Class Counsel" (PDF). Temp. L. Rev. 74 (4): 689.
- Kairys, David (1998). "Legal Claims of Cities Against the Manufacturers of Handguns" (PDF). Temp. L. Rev. 71 (1): 1.
- Heise, Michael (1995). "State Constitutions, School Finance Litigation, and the "Third Wave": From Equity to Adequacy" (PDF). Temp. L. Rev. 68 (3): 1151.
- Robert J. Reinstein, Completing the Constitution, 66 Temp. L. Rev. 361 (1993).
- Schuman, David (1992). "The Right to a Remedy" (PDF). Temp. L. Rev. 65 (4): 1197.
- Hubsch, Allen W. (1992). "The Emerging Right to Education Under State Constitutional Law" (PDF). Temp. L. Rev. 65 (4): 1325.
- Broderick, Raymond J. (1992). "Why the Peremptory Right Should Be Abolished" (PDF). Temp. L. Rev. 65 (2): 369.
- Salken, Barbara C. (1989). "The General Warrant of the Twentieth Century? A Fourth Amendment Solution to Unchecked Discretion to Arrest for Traffic Offenses" (PDF). Temp. L. Rev. 65 (1): 221.
- Bauman, John H. (1988). "Damages for Legal Malpractice: An Appraisal of the Crumbling Dike and the Threatening Flood" (PDF). Temp. L. Rev. 61 (4): 1127.
- Angel, Marina (1988). "Women in Legal Education: What It's Like to be Part of a Perpetual First Wave or the Case of the Disappearing Women" (PDF). Temp. L. Rev. 61 (1): 799.

== Notable quarterly articles ==
- Chief Justice William H. Rehnquist, The Courts and the Constitution, 60 Temp. L.Q. 829 (1987).
- The Philadelphia Special Investigation Commission: The Findings, Conclusions, and Recommendations of the Philadelphia Special Investigation Commission, 59 Temp. L.Q. 339 (1986).
- The Report of the Philadelphia Bar Association Special Committee on Pennsylvania Bar Admission Procedures - Racial Discrimination in Administration of the Pennsylvania Bar Examination, 44 Temp. L.Q. (1971).
- Honorable Robert H. Jackson, et al., Agreement for the Establishment of an International Military Tribunal, 19 Temp. L.Q. 160 (1946); Charter of the International Military Tribunal, 19 Temp. L.Q. 162 (1946); Indictment Against Major Nazi War Criminals, 19 Temp. L.Q. 172 (1946).
- Francis Chapman, Lincoln the Lawyer, 9 Temp. L.Q. 277 (1935).
