= William H. Kirkpatrick =

American judge

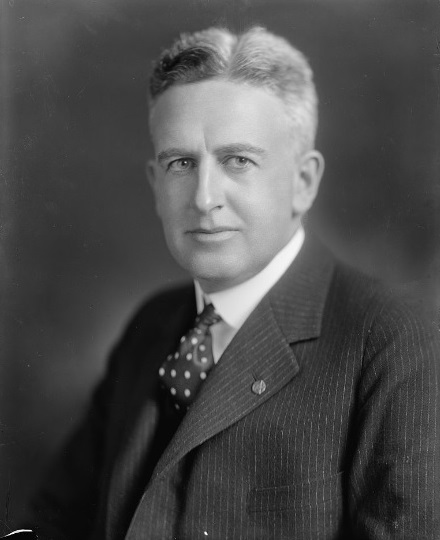

Senior Judge of the United States District Court for the Eastern District of Pennsylvania
- In office May 1, 1958 – November 28, 1970

Chief Judge of the United States District Court for the Eastern District of Pennsylvania
- In office 1948–1958
- Preceded by: Office established
- Succeeded by: James Cullen Ganey

Judge of the United States District Court for the Eastern District of Pennsylvania
- In office March 3, 1927 – May 1, 1958
- Appointed by: Calvin Coolidge
- Preceded by: Seat established by 44 Stat. 1347
- Succeeded by: Harold Kenneth Wood

Member of the U.S. House of Representatives from Pennsylvania's 26th district
- In office March 4, 1921 – March 3, 1923
- Preceded by: Henry Joseph Steele
- Succeeded by: Thomas Wharton Phillips Jr.

Personal details
- Born: William Huntington Kirkpatrick; October 2, 1885 Easton, Pennsylvania
- Died: November 28, 1970 (aged 85) Cumberstone, Maryland
- Party: Republican
- Parent: William Sebring Kirkpatrick (father)
- Education: Lafayette College (A.B.); University of Pennsylvania Law School

William Huntington Kirkpatrick (October 2, 1885 – November 28, 1970) was a United States representative from Pennsylvania and a United States district judge of the United States District Court for the Eastern District of Pennsylvania.

== Education and career ==
Born the son of William Sebring Kirkpatrick in Easton, Northampton County, Pennsylvania, Kirkpatrick attended the public schools, then received an Artium Baccalaureus degree from Lafayette College in 1905 and attended the University of Pennsylvania Law School. He was admitted to the bar and entered private practice of law in Easton starting in 1908. He served in World War I as major and lieutenant colonel, judge advocate, and was a member of the board of review of courts-martial in the United States Army.

== Congressional service ==
Kirkpatrick was elected as a Republican to the United States House of Representatives of the 67th United States Congress, serving from March 4, 1921 until March 3, 1923. He was an unsuccessful candidate for reelection to the 68th United States Congress in 1922. He resumed private practice in Easton from 1923 to 1927.

== Federal judicial service ==
Kirkpatrick was nominated by President Calvin Coolidge on March 3, 1927, to the United States District Court for the Eastern District of Pennsylvania, to a new seat created by 44 Stat. 1347. He was confirmed by the United States Senate on March 3, 1927, and received his commission the same day. He served as Chief Judge from 1948 to 1958. He assumed senior status on May 1, 1958. He was the last federal judge in active service to have been appointed to his position by President Coolidge. (Note: John Benjamin Sanborn Jr., appointed by Coolidge to the District of Minnesota, would be appointed by Herbert Hoover to the Eighth Circuit and remain in active service until 1959, one year after Kirkpatrick assumed senior status.) His service was terminated on November 28, 1970, due to his death in Cumberstone, an unincorporated community in Anne Arundel County, Maryland. Interment was in Christ Church Cemetery in West River, Maryland.

=== Notable cases ===
Kirkpatrick is remembered as "one of the unsung heroes of American corporate and securities law," issuing early but influential decisions in Insurance Shares Corp. v. Northern Fiscal Corp., which described circumstances in which a corporation's controlling shareholder has a fiduciary duty not to sell the control block to a looter, and Kardon v. National Gypsum Co., first recognizing an implied private cause of action for Rule 10b-5 violations.

== Other service ==
Kirkpatrick was a trustee to Lafayette College from 1933 to 1961.

== See also ==
- List of United States federal judges by longevity of service

U.S. House of Representatives
Preceded by Henry Joseph Steele	Member of the U.S. House of Representatives from Pennsylvania's 26th congressional district 1921–1923	Succeeded by Thomas Wharton Phillips Jr.
Legal offices
Preceded by Seat established by 44 Stat. 1347	Judge of the United States District Court for the Eastern District of Pennsylvania; 1927–1958	Succeeded by Harold Kenneth Wood
Preceded by Office established	Chief Judge of the United States District Court for the Eastern District of Pennsylvania; 1948–1958	Succeeded by James Cullen Ganey
