= Henry J. Steele =

American politician

Henry Joseph Steele
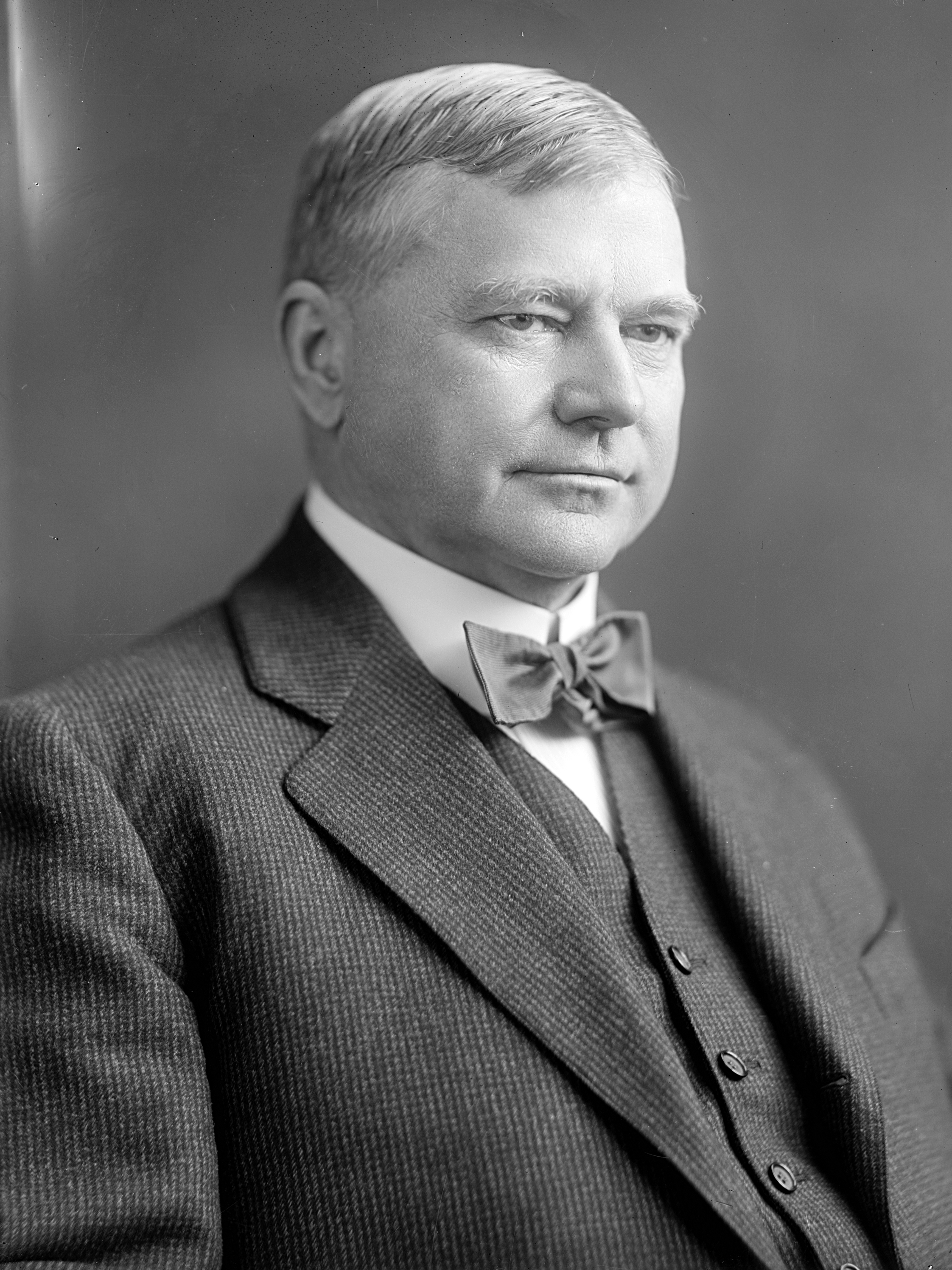

Member of the U.S. House of Representatives from Pennsylvania's 26th district
- In office March 4, 1915 – March 3, 1921
- Preceded by: A. Mitchell Palmer
- Succeeded by: William Huntington Kirkpatrick

Personal details
- Born: May 10, 1860 Easton, Pennsylvania, U.S.
- Died: March 19, 1933 (aged 72) Easton, Pennsylvania, U.S.
- Party: Democratic

Henry Joseph Steele (May 10, 1860 – March 19, 1933) was a Democratic member of the U.S. House of Representatives from Pennsylvania.

== Biography ==
Henry J. Steele was born in Easton, Pennsylvania. He graduated from Stevens College of Business in 1875. He studied law, was admitted to the bar in 1881, and commenced practice in Easton, Pennsylvania. He was a member of the board of education from 1889 to 1893. He served as city solicitor from 1889 to 1895, and as a delegate to the State constitutional convention in 1891. He was president of the Pennsylvania Bar Association in 1914.

Steele was elected as a Democrat to the Sixty-fourth, Sixty-fifth, and Sixty-sixth Congresses. He declined to be a candidate for renomination in 1920. He resumed the practice of law in Easton. He served as a director of the Lehigh Valley Transit Co. and of the Pennsylvania Motor Co.

== Death and interment ==
Steele died in Easton and was buried in Easton Cemetery.

== Sources ==
- United States Congress. "Henry J. Steele (id: S000831)". Biographical Directory of the United States Congress..
- Henry Joseph Steele at The Political Graveyard

U.S. House of Representatives
Preceded by A. Mitchell Palmer	Member of the U.S. House of Representatives from Pennsylvania's 26th congressional district 1915–1921	Succeeded by William H. Kirkpatrick
