= Harold Kenneth Wood =

American judge

Senior Judge of the United States District Court for the Eastern District of Pennsylvania
- In office June 24, 1971 – December 17, 1972

Judge of the United States District Court for the Eastern District of Pennsylvania
- In office September 10, 1959 – June 24, 1971
- Appointed by: Dwight D. Eisenhower
- Preceded by: William Huntington Kirkpatrick
- Succeeded by: Clifford Scott Green

Personal details
- Born: Harold Kenneth Wood; March 21, 1906 Mount Vernon, New York
- Died: December 17, 1972 (aged 66) Philadelphia, Pennsylvania
- Education: Colgate University (A.B.); University of Pennsylvania Law School (LL.B.)

Harold Kenneth Wood (March 21, 1906 – December 17, 1972) was a United States district judge of the United States District Court for the Eastern District of Pennsylvania.

== Education and career ==
Born in Mount Vernon, New York, Wood received an Artium Baccalaureus degree from Colgate University in 1927 and a Bachelor of Laws from the University of Pennsylvania Law School in 1934. He was a tax examiner for the Commonwealth of Pennsylvania from 1940 to 1941. He was an assistant district attorney of Chester County, Pennsylvania from 1942 to 1945. He was legal counsel for the Selective Service System from 1941 to 1945. He was in private practice in Pennsylvania from 1946 to 1957. He was the United States Attorney for the Eastern District of Pennsylvania from 1957 to 1959.

== Federal judicial service ==
Wood was nominated by President Dwight D. Eisenhower on March 2, 1959, to a seat on the United States District Court for the Eastern District of Pennsylvania vacated by Judge William Huntington Kirkpatrick. He was confirmed by the United States Senate on September 9, 1959, and received his commission on September 10, 1959. He assumed senior status due to a certified disability on June 24, 1971. Wood served in that capacity until his death on December 17, 1972, in Philadelphia, Pennsylvania.

== Sources ==
Legal offices
Preceded by William Huntington Kirkpatrick	Judge of the United States District Court for the Eastern District of Pennsylvania; 1959–1971	Succeeded by Clifford Scott Green
