= Thomas James Clary =

American judge (1899–1977)

Senior Judge of the United States District Court for the Eastern District of Pennsylvania
- In office March 1, 1969 – August 1, 1977

Chief Judge of the United States District Court for the Eastern District of Pennsylvania
- In office 1961–1969
- Preceded by: James Cullen Ganey
- Succeeded by: John W. Lord Jr.

Judge of the United States District Court for the Eastern District of Pennsylvania
- In office October 21, 1949 – March 1, 1969
- Appointed by: Harry S. Truman
- Preceded by: Seat established by 63 Stat. 493
- Succeeded by: Seat abolished

Personal details
- Born: Thomas James Clary; August 31, 1899 Seneca Falls, New York
- Died: August 1, 1977 (aged 77) Philadelphia, Pennsylvania
- Education: Cornell University (A.B.); Georgetown Law (LL.B.)

Thomas James Clary (August 31, 1899 – August 1, 1977) was a United States district judge of the United States District Court for the Eastern District of Pennsylvania.

== Education and career ==
Born in Seneca Falls, New York, Clary received an Artium Baccalaureus degree from Cornell University in 1920 and a Bachelor of Laws from Georgetown Law in 1924. He was in private practice in Philadelphia, Pennsylvania from 1924 to 1949.

== Federal judicial service ==
Clary received a recess appointment from President Harry S. Truman on October 21, 1949, to the United States District Court for the Eastern District of Pennsylvania, to a new seat authorized by 63 Stat. 493. He was nominated to the same position by President Truman on January 5, 1950. He was confirmed by the United States Senate on March 8, 1950, and received his commission on March 9, 1950. He served as Chief Judge from 1961 to 1969. He was a member of the Judicial Conference of the United States from 1966 to 1968. He assumed senior status on March 1, 1969. His service terminated on August 1, 1977, due to his death in Philadelphia.

== Sources ==
Legal offices
Preceded by Seat established by 63 Stat. 493	Judge of the United States District Court for the Eastern District of Pennsylvania; 1949–1969	Succeeded by Seat abolished
Preceded by James Cullen Ganey	Chief Judge of the United States District Court for the Eastern District of Pennsylvania; 1961–1969	Succeeded by John W. Lord Jr.
