= Kristen Gibbons Feden =

American attorney

- Born: January 15, 1983 (age 43)
- Other name: Kristen M. Gibbons Feden
- Education: Lafayette College (BS); Temple University Beasley School of Law (JD)
- Occupation: Attorney
- Spouse: Nicholas Feden
- Children: 2

Kristen M. Gibbons Feden (born January 15, 1983) is an American attorney, legal analyst, and former Assistant District Attorney of Montgomery County, Pennsylvania. She is known for her legal work in sex crimes, civil rights, and elder abuse cases. She is best known for being one of the prosecutors working on the Bill Cosby sexual assault cases, prosecuting Cosby for three counts of aggravated indecent assault against Andrea Constand, resulting in his conviction in 2018.

== Early life and education ==
Feden grew up in Willingboro Township, New Jersey. She initially graduated with a B.S. in neuroscience from Lafayette College in 2004 before eventually enrolling and earning a J.D. from Temple University Beasley School of Law in 2009.

== Career ==
Before pursuing a career in law, Feden worked as a financial analyst at Bloomberg L.P. for two years. After law school, Feden worked as a legal clerk for a Montgomery County Court of Common Pleas judge, before eventually joining the office of the Montgomery County District Attorney as an Assistant District Attorney in 2012.

While serving as an Assistant District Attorney, Feden served in roles such as the head of the elder abuse and domestic violence unit and a member of the sex crimes unit. Feden was assigned to work on Andrea Constand v. William H. Cosby, Jr. after the case was reopened in 2015.

Feden delivered the opening statement when the case went to trial in 2017, though the trial ended in a jury deadlock and mistrial declaration. She left her role as an Assistant District Attorney on August 15, 2017, to join law firm Stradley Ronon. She would take a leave of absence from the firm to serve as a special prosecutor for Cosby's retrial in 2018. She delivered the closing arguments at the trial's conclusion. She was the 2018 recipient of the Victim Rights Law Center's Leadership Award for her efforts in the case.

Feden joined the office of personal injury firm Saltz Mongeluzzi & Bendesky in 2020 to work on sexual abuse civil cases. She has also served as a professor of sociology at Rosemont College.

== Personal life ==
Kristen Gibbons married Nicholas Feden, who is also an attorney. They have two children.

== See also ==
- Andrea Constand v. William H. Cosby, Jr.
