= James Cullen Ganey =

American judge (1899–1972)

Senior Judge of the United States Court of Appeals for the Third Circuit
- In office August 15, 1966 – February 7, 1972

Judge of the United States Court of Appeals for the Third Circuit
- In office August 15, 1961 – August 15, 1966
- Appointed by: John F. Kennedy
- Preceded by: Seat established by 75 Stat. 80
- Succeeded by: Francis Lund Van Dusen

Chief Judge of the United States District Court for the Eastern District of Pennsylvania
- In office 1958–1961
- Preceded by: William Huntington Kirkpatrick
- Succeeded by: Thomas James Clary

Judge of the United States District Court for the Eastern District of Pennsylvania
- In office June 19, 1940 – August 30, 1961
- Appointed by: Franklin D. Roosevelt
- Preceded by: Seat established by 54 Stat. 219
- Succeeded by: A. Leon Higginbotham Jr.

United States Attorney for the Eastern District of Pennsylvania
- In office 1937–1940
- President: Franklin D. Roosevelt
- Preceded by: Charles D. McAvoy
- Succeeded by: Gerald A. Gleeson

Personal details
- Born: April 22, 1899 Phillipsburg, New Jersey
- Died: February 7, 1972 (aged 72)
- Education: Lehigh University (LLB); Harvard Law School (LLB)

James Cullen Ganey (April 22, 1899 – February 7, 1972) was a United States circuit judge of the United States Court of Appeals for the Third Circuit and previously was a United States district judge of the United States District Court for the Eastern District of Pennsylvania.

== Education and career ==
Born in Phillipsburg, New Jersey, Ganey received a Bachelor of Laws from Lehigh University in 1920, and another from Harvard Law School in 1923. He was in private practice in Bethlehem, Pennsylvania from 1923 to 1937. He was the United States Attorney for the Eastern District of Pennsylvania from 1937 to 1940.

== Federal judicial service ==
Ganey was nominated by President Franklin D. Roosevelt on June 11, 1940, to the United States District Court for the Eastern District of Pennsylvania, to a new seat authorized by 54 Stat. 219. He was confirmed by the United States Senate on June 13, 1940, and received his commission on June 19, 1940. He served as Chief Judge and as a member of the Judicial Conference of the United States from 1958 to 1961. His service terminated on August 30, 1961, due to elevation to the Third Circuit.

Ganey was nominated by President John F. Kennedy on August 3, 1961, to the United States Court of Appeals for the Third Circuit, to a new seat authorized by 75 Stat. 80. He was confirmed by the Senate on August 15, 1961, and received his commission on August 15, 1961. He assumed senior status on August 15, 1966. His service terminated on February 7, 1972, due to his death.

== Sources ==
Legal offices
| Preceded by Seat established by 54 Stat. 219 | Judge of the United States District Court for the Eastern District of Pennsylvania; 1940–1961 | Succeeded by A. Leon Higginbotham Jr. |
| Preceded by William Huntington Kirkpatrick | Chief Judge of the United States District Court for the Eastern District of Pennsylvania; 1958–1961 | Succeeded by Thomas James Clary |
| Preceded by Seat established by 75 Stat. 80 | Judge of the United States Court of Appeals for the Third Circuit; 1961–1966 | Succeeded by Francis Lund Van Dusen |
