= Louis Bechtle =

American judge (1927–2024)

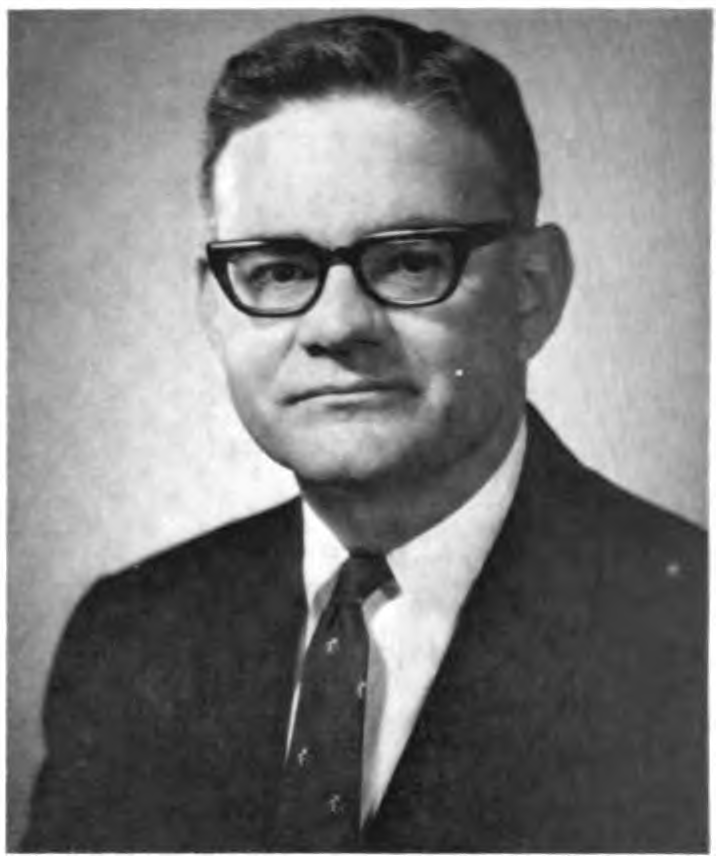

Senior Judge of the United States District Court for the Eastern District of Pennsylvania
- In office April 30, 1993 – June 30, 2001

Chief Judge of the United States District Court for the Eastern District of Pennsylvania
- In office 1990–1993
- Preceded by: John P. Fullam
- Succeeded by: Edward N. Cahn

Judge of the United States District Court for the Eastern District of Pennsylvania
- In office March 7, 1972 – April 30, 1993
- Appointed by: Richard Nixon
- Preceded by: John W. Lord Jr.
- Succeeded by: Marjorie Rendell

Personal details
- Born: Louis Charles Bechtle; December 14, 1927 Philadelphia, Pennsylvania, U.S.
- Died: December 22, 2024 (aged 97) Audubon, Pennsylvania, U.S.
- Education: Temple University (B.S.); Temple University Beasley School of Law (LL.B.)

Louis Charles Bechtle (December 14, 1927 – December 22, 2024) was a United States district judge of the United States District Court for the Eastern District of Pennsylvania.

== Education and career ==
Born on December 14, 1927, in Philadelphia, Pennsylvania, Bechtle was in the United States Army from 1946 to 1947, then received a Bachelor of Science degree from Temple University in 1951 and a Bachelor of Laws from Temple University Beasley School of Law in 1954. He was an Assistant United States Attorney in Philadelphia from 1956 to 1959. He was in private practice in Philadelphia from 1959 to 1962, and in Norristown, Pennsylvania from 1962 to 1969. He was the United States Attorney for the Eastern District of Pennsylvania from 1969 to 1972.

== Federal judicial service ==
On February 14, 1972, Bechtle was nominated by President Richard Nixon to a seat on the United States District Court for the Eastern District of Pennsylvania vacated by Judge John W. Lord Jr. Bechtle was confirmed by the United States Senate on March 2, 1972, and received his commission on March 7, 1972. He served as Chief Judge from 1990 to 1993, assuming senior status on April 30, 1993, and retiring from the bench entirely on June 30, 2001.

== Personal life and death ==
Bechtle had two wives that predeceased him: Helen O’Donnell and Margaret Beck. Out of the two marriages he had three children. Bechtle died in an assisted living facility in Audubon, Pennsylvania, on December 22, 2024, at the age of 97.

== Sources ==
Legal offices
Preceded by John W. Lord Jr.	Judge of the United States District Court for the Eastern District of Pennsylvania; 1972–1993	Succeeded by Marjorie Rendell
Preceded by John P. Fullam	Chief Judge of the United States District Court for the Eastern District of Pennsylvania; 1990–1993	Succeeded by Edward N. Cahn
