= Temple University Beasley School of Law =

Law school in Philadelphia, Pennsylvania, US

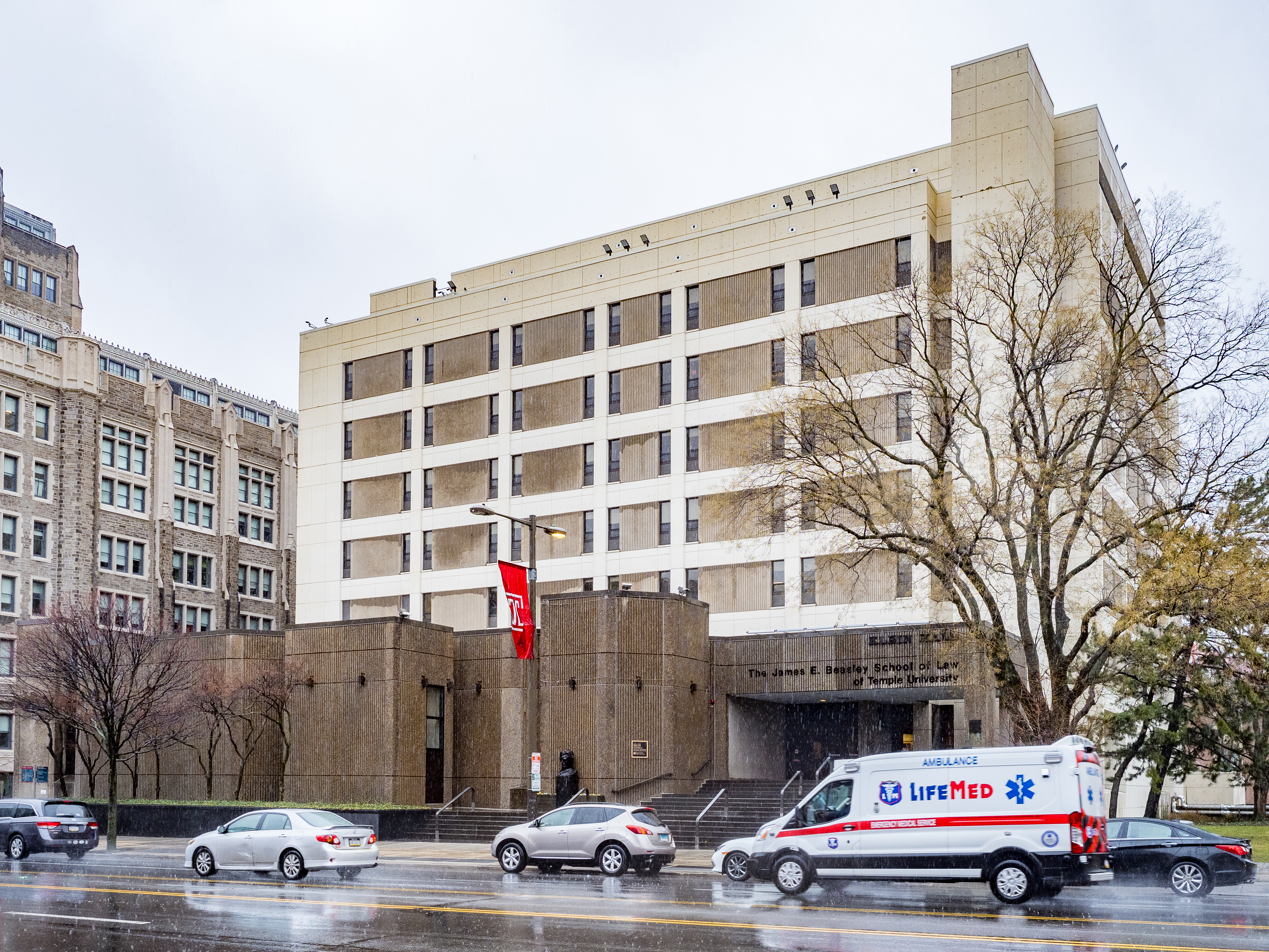
- Klein Hall at Temple University Beasley School of Law
- Parent school: Temple University
- Established: 1895; 131 years ago
- School type: Public law school
- Parent endowment: $839.08 million (2023)
- Dean: Lonnie T. Brown, Jr.
- Location: Philadelphia, Pennsylvania, United States
- Enrollment: 658
- Faculty: 64 (full time)
- USNWR ranking: 49th (tied) (2026)
- Bar pass rate: 90.57% (2024 first-time takers)
- Website: www.law.temple.edu
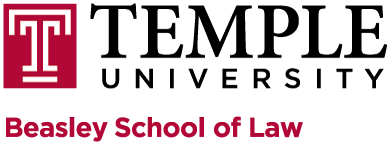

The Temple University Beasley School of Law (formally the James E. Beasley School of Law of Temple University) is the law school of Temple University, a public research university in Philadelphia, Pennsylvania. It was founded in 1895 and enrolls about 650 students.

== Student body ==
Admission for the fall 2023 entering class was competitive with 768 applicants being offered admission out of 1949 (a 39.40% acceptance rate) with 208 applicants enrolling (27.08% of those accepted enrolling). The fall 2025 class's median GPA was 3.76 and the median LSAT score was 166. The 2023 25th/75th percentile of entrants had GPAs of 3.42/3.81, and LSAT scores of 159/165. The class entering in 2023 represented 125 different colleges, and came from 38 states and countries. Women were 47% of the class, 38% were students of color, and the average age was 25.

== Faculty ==
Temple Law School employs 64 full-time faculty members and numerous local attorneys as adjuncts. Lonnie T. Brown, Jr. is the Kean Family Dean and Peter J. Liacouras Professor of Law, succeeding Kristen E. Murray, who was the Interim Kean Family Dean for the 2025-2026 academic year. She succeeded Rachel Rebouché, a leading reproductive health law scholar, who was named dean in 2022 after serving in an interim capacity. She succeeded Gregory N. Mandel, who served as dean from 2016 until being named provost of Temple University in August 2021. Peter J. Liacouras, a professor at Temple Law, served as dean from 1972 to 1982. He was appointed the university's 7th president in 1982 serving a record tenure until 2000, and was the university's chancellor from 2000 until his death in 2016. Robert J. Reinstein was dean of the law school from 1989 to 2008. JoAnne A. Epps, a professor at Temple Law since 1985, was dean from 2008 to 2016, when she was appointed provost of Temple University. Epps later went on to serve as the university's 13th president in 2023 before her untimely death in the autumn of 2023.

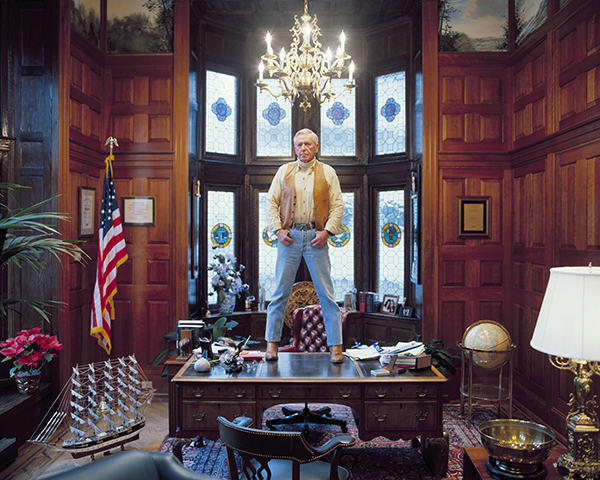
James E. Beasley, Sr., trial lawyer and namesake of the school, standing on his desk in his Philadelphia office 1994

== Study abroad programs ==
Temple Law School offers two study abroad programs that are open to students from any ABA approved law school: the summer session in Rome and the spring semester in Tokyo (at Temple University Japan). The Tokyo program is perhaps the most notable, as it is the only ABA-accredited semester program for law students in Japan.

Additionally, Temple JD students are eligible to study at the following partner institutions: Tsinghua University, University College Cork, Tel Aviv University, Utrecht University, Jindal Global Law School, University of Lucerne, InterAmerican University, Bocconi University, and University of Muenster.

Study abroad credits from any program can be used toward the J.D. program or the joint JD/LL.M. in Transnational Law.

== Graduate law programs ==
The Law School offers several advanced degree programs, including Master of Laws Degree (LL.M.) in trial advocacy, transnational law, Asian law and taxation. Certificate programs in estate planning and employee benefits are offered through the taxation program. International lawyers have the opportunity to design their own curriculum through Temple's General LL.M. program. In addition to the LL.M., Temple offers an advanced degree for aspiring scholars, the Doctor of Juridical Science (S.J.D.), and a Graduate Teaching Fellowship program.

- LL.M. in trial advocacy
- LL.M. in transnational law
- LL.M. in taxation

The Graduate Tax Program is designed to provide understanding of complex taxation issues. The program provides candidates with a strong foundation in tax law, as well as the opportunity to develop expertise beyond the level of study offered in J.D. programs. A degree candidate must satisfactorily complete 24 credit hours of course work, including all core curriculum requirements and a writing seminar. Candidates may study on a full-time or part-time basis and all coursework must be completed within four years of matriculation. Applicants must have satisfactorily completed a basic income tax course in law school or demonstrated comparable work experience. An applicant who cannot meet this requirement must take the basic course in taxation offered in Temple's J.D. program in the student's first term after admission to the LL.M. program.

=== LL.M. in Asian law ===
Temple's LL.M. in Asian law is designed for J.D. holders and students who wish to focus on the law of Asian countries, particularly China, Japan and India, the more powerful economies of the region. Students complete the first of two semesters at the Philadelphia campus, taking foundational courses such as Chinese law, Japanese law and law in Asia. Students are then required to spend the second semester at one of either Temple University Japan in Tokyo, Jindal Global Law School in the National Capital Region (Delhi) of India, or Tsinghua University Law School in Beijing, China. Students must maintain a G.P.A. of at least 2.50 (out of 4.0) over the course of the 24 credits they must earn to graduate.

=== General LL.M. for international lawyers ===
Temple offers a general studies LL.M. program for foreign-trained lawyers. With the exception of two required research and writing courses, students can design their own curriculum from more than 180 courses offered annually in American and international law. General LL.M. degree candidates must successfully complete 24 credit hours of course work with a cumulative grade point average of 2.0 (out of a possible 4.0). The program can be completed in two semesters beginning in August and continuing to May. In addition to the main campus in Philadelphia, the General LL.M. is offered in Tokyo and Beijing. Students may transfer up to four credits at Temple's six-week summer law program in Rome, Italy, to the main campus L.L.M.

=== Doctor of Juridical Science ===
The Doctor of Juridical Science is a research-oriented degree program designed for those seeking to pursue careers as law teachers and scholars of law. Candidates enrolled in the S.J.D. program are required to spend their initial academic year in residence at the main campus in Philadelphia.

=== Estate planning and employee benefits certificates ===
An Estate Planning Certificate and Employee Benefits Certificate is offered through the Graduate Tax Program for practitioners who do not wish to pursue an LL.M. degree. The Estate Planning Certificate exposes students to federal estate, gift and generation-skipping taxation issues, as well as federal income taxation of trusts and estates.

== Law School organizations ==
=== Moot Court ===
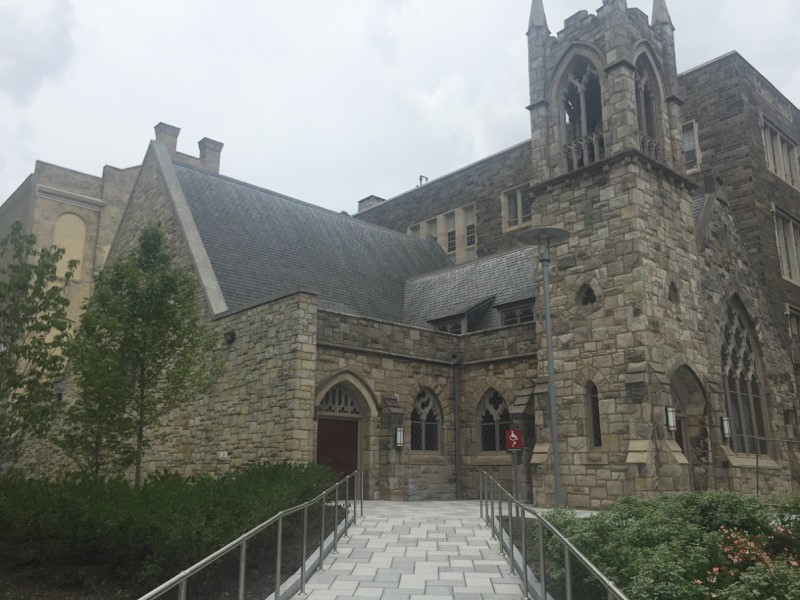
Shusterman Hall

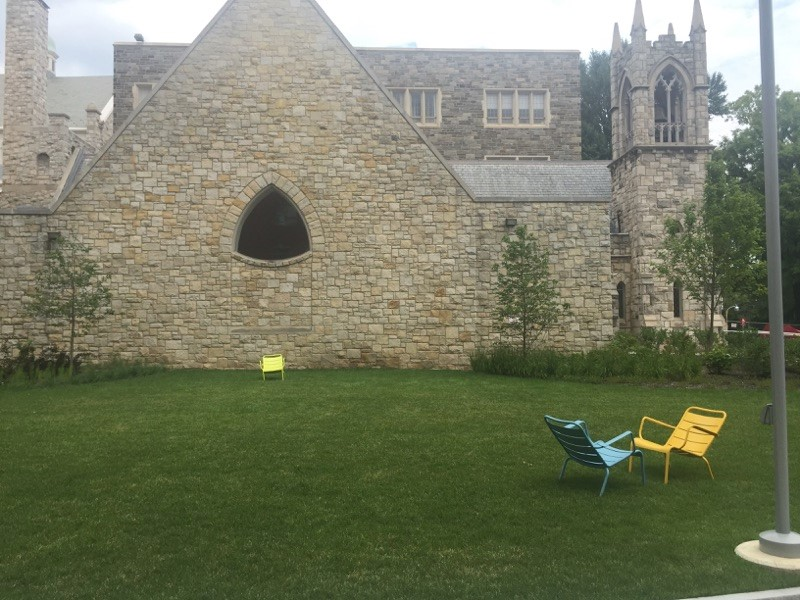
Side view of Shusterman Hall

Temple Law's Moot Court was started in the 1950s. Moot Court members are selected as second-year law students through the Samuel L. Polsky Selection Competition, which is held during the fall semester. Polsky participants research and write an appellate brief, then argue both sides of the case before experienced attorneys who serve as appellate court justices. Students receiving the highest scores for brief writing and oral argument are invited to join the society.

=== Law journals ===
Temple Law has two student-edited journals and law reviews. The Temple Law Review is published quarterly and the Temple International and Comparative Law Journal is published on a bi-annual basis. The 2022 W&L Law Journal Rankings place the Temple Law Review as the 87th best law journal in the nation with a score of 15.27 out of 100.

== Employment statistics ==
95.2% of the Class of 2023 was employed in fulltime, long term, JD advantage or bar required jobs, while 93.3% of the class was employed in fulltime, long term, bar required jobs, i.e. jobs as attorneys.

== Rankings and recognition ==
- U.S. News & World Report ranks Temple Law the tied for 50th best law school in the country in its 2025 law school rankings.
- U.S. News & World Report ranks Temple Law's part-time (evening) program as the 9th best in the country in its 2025 law school rankings.
- Above the Law ranked Temple Law 43rd in its annual "Top Law Schools" report for legal employment outcomes in 2015, 2016, 2017 and 2019.
- National Law Journal ranked Temple Law as a top 50 best law school in its annual report for 2016. The law school ranked 19th for alumni who were promoted to partnership in 2015.
- In 2022, Temple's Pennsylvania Bar Examination passage rate was 85.16% for first time takers while its overall first-time passage rate was 83.06%.

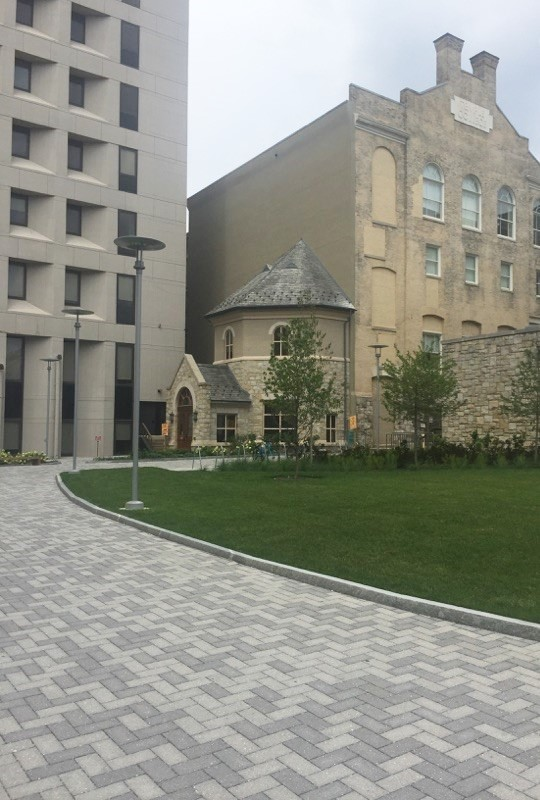
Back entrance of Barrack Hall

== Notable alumni ==
- Lynne Abraham (1965), former district attorney of Philadelphia.
- Mari Carmen Aponte (1975), appointed by President Barack Obama to the position of U.S. Ambassador to El Salvador.
- Amy Banse (1987), president of Comcast Interactive Media.
- Susan Paradise Baxter (1983), judge of the United States District Court for the Western District of Pennsylvania
- Louis Bechtle (1954), judge of the United States District Court for the Eastern District of Pennsylvania
- Edward G. Biester, Jr. (1955), U.S. House of Representatives from Pennsylvania (1967–1977); Attorney General of Pennsylvania (1979–1980); judge, Bucks County Court of Common Pleas (1980–2006); U.S. Court of Military Commission Review (appointed September 2004).
- Pat Browne, former Pennsylvania senator for the 16th district.
- Albert E. Burling, justice of the Supreme Court of New Jersey
- Jim Cawley, 32nd Lieutenant Governor of Pennsylvania.
- Kristen Gibbons Feden (2009) - Prosecuting attorney on Andrea Constand v. William H. Cosby, Jr. after the case was reopened in 2015.
- Katayoun Copeland, assistant U.S. Attorney (2019–2023) and district attorney of Delaware County, Pennsylvania (2018–2019)
- Thomas M. Foglietta (1952), former member of the U.S. House of Representatives for Pennsylvania's 1st congressional district.
- Philip Forman (1919), judge of the United States Court of Appeals for the Third Circuit, formally granted United States citizenship to Albert Einstein and Kurt Gödel
- Abraham Lincoln Freedman (1926), judge of the United States Court of Appeals for the Third Circuit
- Vince Fumo (1972), convicted felon and former Pennsylvania senator
- Mitchell S. Goldberg (1986), judge on the U.S. District Court for the Eastern District of Pennsylvania.
- James Henry Gorbey (1949), United States federal judge
- Clifford Scott Green, former judge on the U.S. District Court for the Eastern District of Pennsylvania.
- Martin A. Herman (1963), politician who served in the New Jersey General Assembly, where he represented the 3rd Legislative District from 1974 to 1986, and was later appointed as a judge in New Jersey Superior Court in Gloucester County.
- Herbert J. Hutton (1962), judge of the United States District Court for the Eastern District of Pennsylvania
- Melanie B. Jacobs (2002), dean of the University of Louisville School of Law
- George R. Johnson (1955), Pennsylvania State representative for the 166th district (1967–1972)
- Barbara S. Jones (1973), judge of the United States District Court for the Southern District of New York
- Kathleen Kane (1993), first female Pennsylvania Attorney General and convicted felon
- James McGirr Kelly (1957), judge of the United States District Court for the Eastern District of Pennsylvania
- Robert F. Kelly (1960), judge of the United States District Court for the Eastern District of Pennsylvania
- Chad F. Kenney (1980), judge of the United States District Court for the Eastern District of Pennsylvania
- Mark Levin (1980), chief of staff to Attorney General Edwin Meese and nationally syndicated radio host.
- Jose L. Linares (1978), judge of the United States District Court for the District of New Jersey.
- Mary M. Lisi (1977), judge of the United States District Court for the District of Rhode Island.
- Joseph J. Longobardi (1957), judge of the United States District Court for the District of Delaware
- John W. Lord Jr. (1928), judge of the United States District Court for the Eastern District of Pennsylvania
- Alan David Lourie (1970), judge of the United States Court of Appeals for the Federal Circuit
- Albert Branson Maris (1918), judge of the United States Court of Appeals for the Third Circuit
- Seamus McCaffrey, justice on the Supreme Court of Pennsylvania.
- James P. McGranery (1928), 61st United States Attorney General, United States Representative for Pennsylvania's 2nd District, judge of the United States District Court for the Eastern District of Pennsylvania
- Patricia A. McInerney (1981), judge, Philadelphia Court of Common Pleas, First Judicial District of Pennsylvania (1996-2018)
- Pat Meehan, former United States House of Representatives, Pennsylvania 7th District; former United States Attorney for the Eastern District of Pennsylvania.
- Cecil B. Moore, (1951) civil rights activist, and former member of Philadelphia City Council.
- James M. Munley (1963), judge on the United States District Court for the Middle District of Pennsylvania.
- Drew O'Keefe - U.S. Attorney for the Eastern District of Pennsylvania
- John R. Padova (1959), judge of the United States District Court for the Eastern District of Pennsylvania
- Christopher L. Paris (2004), 23rd Commissioner of the Pennsylvania State Police
- Lowell A. Reed Jr. (1958), judge of the United States District Court for the Eastern District of Pennsylvania
- Leon Rose, President of the New York Knicks
- Allen Rosenberg, rower and rowing coach
- Timothy J. Savage (1971), judge on the United States District Court for the Eastern District of Pennsylvania.
- Albert W. Sheppard, Jr. (1968), judge, Court of Common Pleas of Philadelphia
- Martin J. Silverstein (1979), United States Ambassador to Uruguay,
- Richard A. Snyder, Pennsylvania State Senator for the 13th district from 1961 to 1984
- William Henry Stafford Jr. (1956), judge of the United States District Court for the Northern District of Florida
- John F. Street (1975), former mayor of Philadelphia.
- Charles Swift (1999 L.L.M.), a lieutenant commander in the U.S. Navy, Judge Advocate General's Corps.
- Petrese B. Tucker (1976), judge on the United States District Court for the Eastern District of Pennsylvania.
- David Urban (J.D.), political commentator and lobbyist.
- Franklin S. Van Antwerpen, judge on United States Court of Appeals for the Third Circuit, former judge on the United States District Court for the Eastern District of Pennsylvania.
- James "Jim" Walden (1991), former Assistant U.S. Attorney for the Eastern District of New York and founder, Walden Macht & Haran LLP
- Charles R. Weiner (1949), judge of the United States District Court for the Eastern District of Pennsylvania
- Joseph Putnam Willson (1931), judge of the United States District Court for the Western District of Pennsylvania
- Lloyd H. Wood, 20th Lieutenant Governor of Pennsylvania from 1951 to 1955

== See also ==
- Pennsylvania Law Schools
