= H. Edgar Barnes =

American judge (1883–1940)

- Official portrait

Associate Justice of the Supreme Court of Pennsylvania
- In office August 13, 1935 – October 6, 1940
- Preceded by: Alexander Simpson
- Succeeded by: William M. Parker

Pennsylvania Secretary of Revenue
- In office January 16, 1935 – July 31, 1935
- Governor: George Howard Earle III
- Preceded by: Leon D. Metzger
- Succeeded by: Harry Ellis Kalodner

Personal details
- Born: June 28, 1883 Washington, D.C., U.S.
- Died: October 6, 1948 (aged 65) Philadelphia, Pennsylvania, U.S.
- Party: Democratic (1934–1940); Republican (until 1934)

Harold Edgar Barnes (June 28, 1883 – October 6, 1940) was an American jurist who was Pennsylvania Secretary of Revenue in 1935 and justice of the Supreme Court of Pennsylvania from 1935 until his death in 1940.

== Early life ==
Barnes was born in Washington, D.C. on June 28, 1883, to George W. and Lydia (Slee) Barnes. His father was an employee of the federal government. He attended the University of Pennsylvania, graduating from the Wharton School and the University of Pennsylvania Law School. He was admitted to the bar in 1906.

== Career ==
From 1906 to 1916, Barnes taught courses in political science and business law at Penn while also working as a lawyer. In 1916, he was elected to the Philadelphia Common Council as an Independent Republican. He ran for a seat on the new unicameral Philadelphia City Council in 1919, but was unsuccessful.

Barnes was the personal attorney of George Howard Earle Jr. and George Howard Earle III and was a director and legal counsel for their Pennsylvania Sugar Company. He advised the younger Earle to run as a Democrat in the 1934 Pennsylvania gubernatorial election. Shortly after winning, Earle announced that Barnes would serve as secretary of revenue in his cabinet. He was confirmed by the Pennsylvania Senate on January 16, 1935.

Barnes resigned effective July 31, 1935 to run in that year's Supreme Court election. Prior to the election, Justice Alexander Simpson died and Earle appointed Barnes to succeed him until an election could be held. He was sworn in on August 13, 1935. Pennsylvania Attorney General Charles J. Margiotti ruled that because there were two open seats on the Supreme Court, the top two vote-getters in the 1935 election would be seated on the court. Thus, the winners of the Democratic and Republican primary would each receive a full 21-year term. Barnes easily beat his primary opponent, Michael Musmanno, 215,045 votes to 93,123.

On September 28, 1940, Barnes entered Hahnemann University Hospital to receive treatment for asthma and bronchitis. While there, he suffered a cerebral hemorrhage and died on October 6, 1940.
