= 1938 Pennsylvania gubernatorial election =

- November 8, 1938
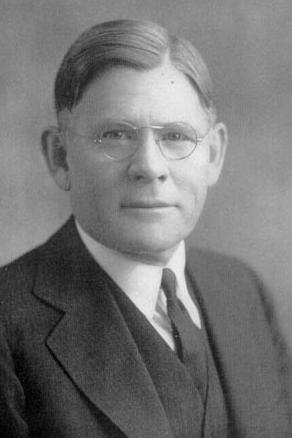

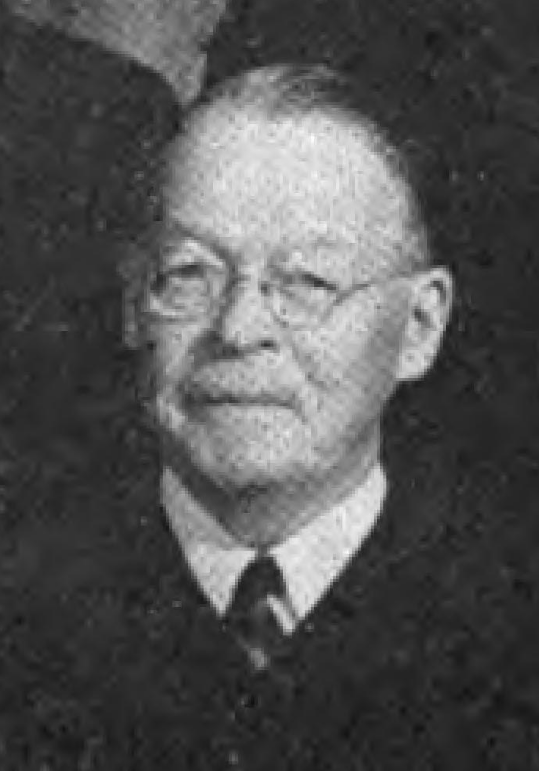
Nominee	Arthur James	Charles Alvin Jones
Party	Republican	Democratic
Popular vote	2,035,340	1,756,192
Percentage	53.39%	46.07%
- County results James: 40–50% 50–60% 60–70% 70–80% Jones: 50–60%
Governor before election
George Earle
Democratic
Elected Governor
Arthur James
Republican

The 1938 Pennsylvania gubernatorial election occurred on November 8, 1938. Incumbent Democratic governor George Howard Earle III was not a candidate for re-election. Republican candidate Arthur James defeated Democratic candidate Charles Alvin Jones to become Governor of Pennsylvania. Gifford Pinchot unsuccessfully sought the Republican nomination, while Thomas Kennedy unsuccessfully sought the Democratic nomination.

== Democratic primary ==
=== Candidates ===
- Charles Alvin Jones, lawyer from Perry County
- Thomas Kennedy, incumbent Lieutenant Governor of Pennsylvania
- Charles J. Margiotti, incumbent Attorney General of Pennsylvania

=== Results ===
Democratic primary results Jones: 40%–50%; 50%–60%; 60%–70%; 70%–80%; 80%–90%; 90%–100%; Kennedy: 40%–50%; 50%–60%; 60%–70%; Margiotti: 40%–50%

Pennsylvania gubernatorial Democratic primary election, 1938
Party	Candidate	Votes	%
Democratic	Charles Alvin Jones	591,546	46.15
Democratic	Thomas Kennedy	517,101	40.35
Democratic	Charles J. Margiotti	173,047	13.50
Total votes		1,281,694	100.00

== Republican primary ==
=== Candidates ===
- Arthur James, former Lieutenant Governor of Pennsylvania (1927–1931)
- James M. Jones, clerk of courts of Cambria County
- Gifford Pinchot, former head of the United States Forest Service and Governor of Pennsylvania (1923–1927, 1931–1935)
- Frank P. B. Thompson, perennial candidate

=== Results ===
Republican primary results James: 50%–60%; 60%–70%; 70%–80%; 80%–90%; Pinchot: 40%–50%; 50%–60%; 60%–70%; 70%–80%; 80%–90%

Pennsylvania gubernatorial Republican primary election, 1938
Party	Candidate	Votes	%
Republican	Arthur James	937,592	65.61
Republican	Gifford Pinchot	450,595	31.53
Republican	James M. Jones	29,269	2.05
Republican	Frank P. B. Thompson	11,591	0.81
Total votes		1,429,047	100.00

== Results ==
Pennsylvania gubernatorial election, 1938
Party	Candidate	Votes	%
Republican	Arthur James	2,035,340	53.39
Democratic	Charles Alvin Jones	1,756,192	46.07
Socialist	Jesse H. Holmes	12,635	0.33
Prohibition	Robert G. Burnham	6,438	0.17
Communist	Ella Reeve Bloor Omholt	1,273	0.03
N/A	Others	89	0.00
Totals		3,811,967	100.00%
