= Kelayres massacre =

1934 mass murder in Pennsylvania, US

- Funerals for three victims, at the site of the killings. Bruno's house has the white roof.
- Location: 40°54′03″N 76°00′14″W; Kelayres, Pennsylvania, US
- Date: November 5, 1934; After 9 p.m.
- Attack type: Mass shooting
- Deaths: 5
- Injuries: 12–25
- Perpetrators: Joseph James Bruno and family

The Kelayres massacre was a shooting attack that took place the evening of November 5, 1934, in the coal-mining village of Kelayres, Pennsylvania, United States. An election-eve parade and rally by Democrats was fired on by multiple shooters as it passed the home of Joseph James Bruno, known as "Big Joe", the local Republican boss. Three victims died almost immediately and two others died over the next two days.

The attack received national news coverage, and accounts of it shared the front page with early election news in several major newspapers. The top newly elected Pennsylvania Democrats attended the funerals. Six members of the Bruno family were eventually found guilty of multiple murder charges in four trials, with Bruno and his brother Phil receiving life sentences.

Bruno escaped from prison, leading to the then-largest manhunt in Pennsylvania history. He was caught eight months later.

All of the Bruno family members were eventually paroled. None ever admitted guilt, and no motive was ever formally established.

== Background ==
Kelayres is a small community of about five city blocks by ten. Surrounded by coal mines, slag heaps, and a reservoir, there are only two streets that connect Kelayres to the neighboring towns of McAdoo and McAdoo Heights.

Joseph James Bruno was the first child of James Biaggio and Marie Antonia (Abbato) Bruno. (Note: James marriage license gives the day as October 22, 1882. Other records give slightly different October dates and years, including 1878. Joseph was born in Bucita, Calabria, Italy in 1883, which accords with his stated age in contemporary news articles.) James Biaggio Bruno first emigrated from Italy in 1877, and went back several times, in 1882 marrying Marie Antonia (Abbato). Marie and their son, Joseph, emigrated in 1886, on one of James' return voyages, well after James settled in Kelayres, making way for his young family. They were from a small village called Bucita, in the Cosenza region of Calabria, Italy.

In Kelayres, the elected school boards had the power to hire and fire schoolteachers, and related contract work was subject to cronyism. A 1907 election which many locals considered questionable led to Bruno becoming school board director and a cousin Louis the school principal. Brother Philip also became a tax collector.

From this point, Bruno's influence grew. He served as justice of the peace, county detective, and an officer at the bank. He ran a garage which maintained the local school buses. He also ran slot machines and bootlegged coal. In nearby Pottsville, he ran a brothel. Critics claimed he abused his powers to enforce loyalty.

In 1932, the old wooden schoolhouse burned down. Bruno led the construction of a new building, the "Bruno School". His brother Louis was killed in an automobile accident, and Bruno's ways of dealing with opposition became cruder and more antagonizing.

On a national level, in 1932, Roosevelt and the Democrats swept most of the country, but not Pennsylvania. Nevertheless, Pennsylvania Democrats felt they had made progress, and campaigned heavily in local elections in 1933 and 1934.

In Kelayres, a rival family, members of the McAloose clan (Note: This family was also Italian. The name was anglicized from Macaluso) swept the local 1933 elections, advocating a teachers' union and other protections against nepotism and cronyism. But Bruno, in his role as justice of the peace, took the ballot box and kept it in his house for several days before turning it over to an election judge for a recount, who ruled in favor of Bruno and the Republicans. The Democrats challenged the recount in the courts. Meanwhile, neither faction recognized the other's legitimacy, resulting in competing slates of schoolteachers, tax collectors, and bus drivers. A court issued a temporary injunction in favor of Bruno. His challengers occupied the school at the beginning of September 1934, and open brawling broke out, leaving the school physically unusable until November.

The Brunos lived mostly barricaded in their houses during this time. They received bomb threats, and even the women took to carrying clubs just to go to church.

== Fourth and Center ==
Fourth Street runs north–south, Center Street runs west–east. The southwest corner of their intersection was occupied by the Bruno house. Built in 1927, a brick house with 12-inch thick walls, it was the most expensive house in the township, worth more than twice the second most expensive.

Just west of the Bruno house were a pool hall and a saloon, both owned by Bruno. The pool hall served as Republican party headquarters. The saloon was rented to Tony Cara, who along with most of his customers, was anti-Bruno by 1934. Immediately south of the Bruno house, on Fourth, was the home of son James.

Across the street on the northwest corner was the Marko building, (Note: No longer there.) occupied by A. J. Payer's butcher shop and two families, including the Fiorillas, who had switched allegiance from Bruno to McAloose, in politics and in a marriage.

On the northeast corner was John Saladago's drug store. Saladago was originally a Bruno supporter. He switched in 1934 to favor the McAlooses, his neighbor one house north. The second floor of Saladago's building had an apartment rented by Paul Bruno, a nephew.

The southeast corner was occupied by the Church of the Immaculate Conception. Its main entrance faced the Bruno house.

== Election eve and shooting ==
Both parties held rallies Monday evening, November 5. The Republicans met in Bruno's pool hall. The Democrats met in McAdoo, and also in front of Nicholas Perna's house, on Center street. About 8 pm, a car containing Bruno's daughter, Antoinette Billig, and others was jeered at by children supporting the Democrats. An occupant responded by firing three warning shots over the children's heads.

An additional torchlight parade by Democrats began around 9 p.m., with men, women and children marching, and younger children riding in an open truck. The parade headed east up Center and turned south along Fourth, in a show to deliberately taunt Bruno and his supporters.

At around 9:10 p.m., Toney Orlando, a nephew of Bruno, was outside the Bruno house and began firing a pistol at the crowd. He was joined by James, firing from in front of his house. Some people had been hit at first, but the immediate reactions were confused, with some thinking fireworks had been set off. Immediately afterwards, several rifles and shotguns were fired repeatedly with some lulls, so rapidly that initial reports mentioned machine guns. About two dozen people were struck.

The initial calls for help to the police were dismissed as pranks. When the police did respond, the shooting was over, and the police had to guard the Bruno house overnight. The initial investigation of the house found, on the second floor, three rifles, three shotguns, and six revolvers, and hundreds of bullets and over a dozen spent shotgun cartridges.

== Election day and funerals ==
Arrested that morning, or held as material witnesses, were Bruno, wife Cecilia, daughter Elveda, sons Alfred and James, sister Lucy, brother Phil, nephews Paul and Arthur, nephew Toney Orlando, a bus driver, and three Bruno-appointed teachers.

The news of the massacre was quickly disseminated, and was front page election day news across the country. In Pennsylvania, it was also widely reported on the radio. Democrats portrayed the massacre as Republican political activity:

Northeastern Pennsylvania last night was treated to the ultimate in Republican persuasiveness when machine gunners operating in the interests of 'Wee Willie' Schnader ... mowed down and slew three unarmed marchers in a Democratic parade

— editorial, Scranton Times, November 6, 1934, p.6

Republicans also commented on the massacre, emphasizing it was a local, ethnic or factional dispute. State Attorney General William A. Schnader was the Republican gubernatorial candidate, and promised a full investigation. At the time, and in later years, he would attribute his loss as partly due to the massacre.

Three funeral services were held at the Immaculate Conception Church in Kelayres. Two were held in the neighboring village of Lofty.

The top newly elected state politicians and cabinet-designates, all Democrats, attended the funerals on Friday, November 9, including Senator-elect Joseph F. Guffey, Governor-elect George Earle, Lieutenant Governor-elect Thomas Kennedy, and Attorney General-designate Charles J. Margiotti. Also in attendance was the former Secretary of the Commonwealth, Richard J. Beamish, who had resigned earlier in the year to support Democratic candidates in his role as a newspaperman. Earle and Guffey were upper-class. Kennedy had worked in the mines since he was 12 and had been a leader in the United Mine Workers. Margiotti also had humble roots and was influential among Italian-Americans. When some women made a personal plea to the Governor-elect in Italian, Margiotti provided the translation. The funerals drew a crowd of about 10,000 and were national news. The funeral speeches contained overtly political remarks. For example, Earle claimed "they died in the trenches of the New Deal".

== Trials ==
Bruno at his third trial in 1935.

The Brunos were kept in Schuylkill County Prison before and during their trials. They were treated leniently. They were allowed to wear ordinary clothing, take food deliveries, they had their own cell keys, they were not kept to hours, and visitors were unsupervised. They had dental work done with a certain dentist in Pottsville. Bruno himself was a prison trustee. Locals called the prison the "Bruno Hotel".

In early December, the school election dispute was resolved against the Brunos. His son James was fired from the First National Bank in McAdoo.

Four trials of seven defendants were held over the next year and a half. Tried were Bruno and his two sons, James and Alfred, brother Phil and his son Arthur, and nephews Paul Bruno and Toney Orlando. The victims were Frank Fiorilla, Andrew Kostishion, Dominic Perna, Josh Galosky, and William Forke.

The first trial was for Bruno alone, for the murder of Fiorilla. Two defense witnesses, relatives Jennie and Lucy Bruno, claimed Dan McAloose had fired shots. Bruno was found guilty of voluntary manslaughter. After the trial, a local man was arrested for attempted jury tampering.

The second trial was for Bruno alone, for the murders of Kostishion, Perna, and Galosky. He was found guilty of three counts of second-degree murder.

The third trial was for the six other Bruno relatives, for the murders of Fiorilla, Kostishion, Perna, and Galosky. Phil was found guilty of four counts of manslaughter, the other defendants were found not guilty.

The fourth trial was for all seven defendants for the murder of Forke. Joe and Phil Bruno were found guilty of first-degree murder, the other five were found guilty of second-degree murder.

Sentencing for the seven defendants was handed down July 13, 1936. Joe and Phil Bruno each were sentenced to life. Alfred, James, and Toney were sentenced to ten-to-twenty years. Arthur was sentenced to five-to-ten years. Paul received a retrial, and was later found not guilty.

== Escape and manhunt ==
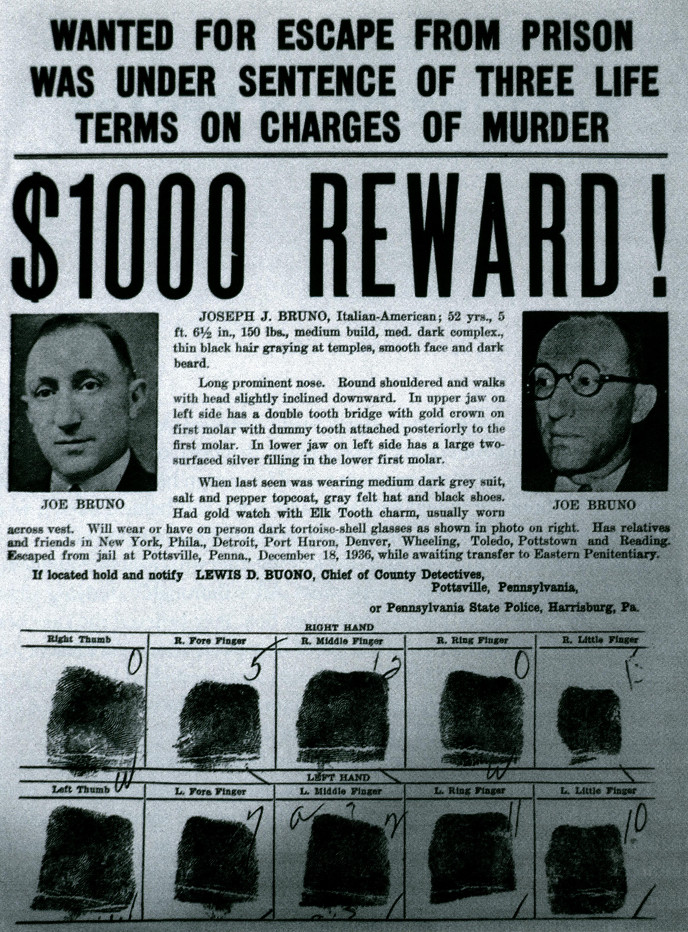
Wanted poster

On November 23, 1936, the Pennsylvania Supreme Court denied the various Bruno family petitions for retrials. Arrangements were made for their transfer to Eastern State Penitentiary. The two Republican members, Alvin Maurer and Philip Ehrig, of the County Commission (Note: The third Commissioner was an uninvolved Democrat.) ordered Warden Herbert Gosselin to allow even more leniencies, and unsupervised family visits increased. Commissioner Ehrig himself visited Bruno.

On December 8, the two Commissioners filled a prison guard vacancy with the inexperienced Guy "Speck" Irving, also over the Warden's objection. On December 17, daughter Antoinette visited four times, ostensibly regarding the handling of family financial matters in Bruno's absence, but later admitted to delivering $1000. That evening Bruno complained of a toothache, and he arranged a visit to the Pottsville dentist for the morning of December 18. Irving, serving as his driver, said that he watched Bruno enter the dentist's building around 9:30 am, and drove around the block to park, then looked in through the dentist's window and thought he saw Bruno in the dentist's chair, and did not wonder what was taking Bruno so long until around 1 pm, and that he then drove around Pottsville for over an hour looking for Bruno, and finally had someone call the prison with the news. The prison clerk passed on the news to James Bruno, who informed the First Deputy. Warden Gosselin was finally apprised of the situation.

The state Attorney General, Charles J. Margiotti, personally supervised the ensuing investigation. He disputed Irving's account, and claimed that the guard drove Bruno directly to a rendezvous location and then waited several hours to report. It was later learned that Bruno had been picked up by a friend, Joshua Nilo, who had been waiting for him that morning. He then stayed at the home of Rocco Garramone in Hazleton. The two drove Bruno to New York City, where he lived as "Frank Miller".

On December 19, Judge Hicks had Gosselin, Walker, Irving imprisoned on various charges, and set bail at $15,000 each. Daughter Antoinette Billig was also arrested, but state Attorney General originally would not allow bail to be set for her, until her husband provided information about the escape On December 21, Margiotti accused the two Republican commissioners of hampering the investigation. (Note: For example, they would not permit interviews of prisoners without their own lawyers present.) On the 23rd, Margiotti issued warrants for Ehrig and Maurer, who were arrested, with bail set at $15,000. In the end however, all but Irving were exonerated.

Lewis Buono (Note: Some sources spell his first name as "Louis". The wanted posters made under his supervision say "Lewis". More confusingly, some reports spell his last name as "Bruno".) was the Chief Detective of Schuylkill County in the 1930s, and assumed control of the hunt for Bruno, his former employee. On August 22, 1937, a tip led Buono to a rooming house in Manhattan, where Bruno was seized without a struggle as he returned. He had dyed his hair black, grown a mustache, gained weight, and changed his glasses.

== Parole ==
All the Bruno family prisoners were paroled. Arthur was paroled in 1938. Toney Orlando was paroled in 1941. Alfred and James were paroled in 1942; Phil a few years later. Joe Bruno was paroled in 1948.

Joe Bruno returned to his house in Kelayres. He received a cold reception. He died in 1951.
