= Marion D. Patterson =

American jurist (1876 – 1950)

Marion Dean Patterson (October 20, 1876 – January 6, 1950) was an American jurist who was an associate justice of the Supreme Court of Pennsylvania from 1940 until his death in 1950.

== Early life ==
Patterson was born on October 20, 1876, in Williamsburg, Pennsylvania and graduated from Stewart's Academy. He taught school in Blair County, Pennsylvania for seven terms and studied law in his spare time. He graduated from Dickinson Law School and was admitted to the bar in 1904.

== Career ==
Patterson was District Attorney of Blair County from 1912 to 1928, when he was elected president judge of the Court of Common Pleas for the Twenty-Fourth Judicial District. He was a candidate for the Republican nomination in the 1934 Pennsylvania gubernatorial election, but withdrew from the race on April 25 and endorsed Lieutenant Governor Edward C. Shannon. Patterson still appeared on the primary ballot and received 9,096 votes, while Shannon finished a distant second behind William A. Schnader. In 1935, Patterson was a candidate the Pennsylvania Supreme Court election, but lost the Republican nomination to Horace Stern. In 1938, Patterson was elected to a second ten-year term on the Court of Common Pleas.

In 1939, Patterson was a candidate for the Pennsylvania Supreme Court seat that was being vacated by the retiring John W. Kephart. Patterson received the backing the Republican establishment as well as Kephart's endorsement. In the Republican primary, he faced Sara Soffel, the first woman to run for a seat on the Supreme Court of Pennsylvania. She ran in both the Republican and Democratic primaries and garnered the most total votes, but did not receive a majority in either race. He narrowly defeated Democrat Herbert Funk Goodrich in the general election, 226,784 votes to 222,553.

Patterson was sworn in on January 2, 1940. He was succeeded on the common pleas court by his brother, George.

On January 6, 1950, Patterson suffered a heart attack in the Supreme Court conference room at Philadelphia City Hall. He was taken to Pennsylvania Hospital, where he suffered two more heart attacks, the final one being fatal. He was survived by his wife and two children.
