= USS Avenger (SP-2646) =

Patrol vessel of the United States Navy

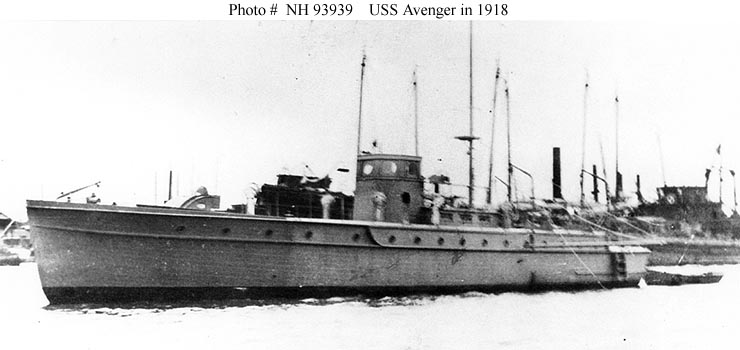
- USS Avenger (SP-2646) Photographed in 1918, probably just after she was taken over for Navy service.

History

United States
- Name: USS Avenger
- Owner: Philips J. Wunderle
- Builder: Clement A. Troth, Camden, New Jersey
- Completed: 1917
- Acquired: May 1918
- Commissioned: 29 May 1918
- Decommissioned: 19 December 1918
- Fate: Returned to owner

General characteristics
- Type: Patrol vessel
- Tonnage: 77 tons
- Length: 74 ft (23 m)
- Beam: 15 ft (4.6 m)
- Draft: 5 ft 3 in (1.60 m)
- Speed: 14.5 knots (26.9 km/h; 16.7 mph)
- Complement: 15
- Armament: 1 × 1-pounder gun; 2× machine guns

USS Avenger (SP-2646) was an armed motorboat that served in the United States Navy as a patrol vessel in 1918.

The second Avenger, a wooden-hulled screw yacht designed by J. Murray Watts and built in 1917 by Clement A. Troth of Camden, New Jersey, was inspected by the Navy on 11 January 1918 and acquired by the Navy in May 1918 under free lease from Philips J. Wunderle of Glenside, Pennsylvania, for service in the 4th Naval District. Assigned the identification number SP-2646, Avenger was commissioned on 29 May 1918 while she lay alongside Pier 19, North Wharves, Philadelphia, Pennsylvania, with Chief Boatswain's Mate Philips J. Wunderle, USNRF (her peacetime owner "called to the colors"), in command.

== Service history ==
Completing the initial phases of her fitting out by the second week of June 1918, Avenger got underway for League Island on the morning of the 10th. She did not go far before she ran aground in shoal water near the back channel. With low water prevailing, her sailors prepared to wait for the incoming tide to refloat Avenger, but three vessels unexpectedly arrived on the scene and offered assistance. With their help, Avenger was soon waterborne and proceeded to League Island. However, since she was shipping water due to two damaged tanks in her bottom, the yacht proceeded thence to Camden, New Jersey, for hull repairs at the boatyard of Quigley and Dorf on 11 and 12 June. After receiving new planking and a coat of paint on her bottom, she returned to Pier 19, North Wharves, the next day, 13 June.

A week later, the vessel got underway at 1000, "Captain" Wunderle at the helm, and headed back toward League Island, where she took on board her main battery, a three-pounder gun, and installed it the next day. Further provisioning and outfitting alongside Pier 19 followed: there, she received the balance of her armament, a pair of machine guns and four mounts, on 5 July. She obtained signals equipment and a large searchlight on the 11th and left Pier 19 the next day for Fort Mifflin, where she took on ammunition. Later that same day, Avenger got underway for New Castle, Delaware, reaching her destination that evening, and tarried there for the night.

Pushing on the next day, Avenger reached Cape May, New Jersey, her assigned section base, on the 13th, via Reedy Island. The following morning, the erstwhile pleasure craft got underway for her maiden wartime patrol, which she conducted in waters off the McCrie Shoal Buoy.

During her second patrol, (18 to 20 July) she received information by wireless of enemy submarine activity near New York Harbor and promptly loaded her three-pounder to be ready for action. She soon received a signal from Emerald (SP-177) to patrol toward the McCrie Shoal for a distance of 10 miles in search of the U-boat reported in their vicinity. In the pre-dawn darkness on 20 July, Avenger drew within hailing distance of Emerald and received oral orders to instruct all northbound vessels to "hug the coast" because of the U-boats operating to seaward. In accordance with those orders, Avenger hailed a steamer at 0210 on the 20th and warned that Portland-bound vessel of her danger.

Avenger's third patrol (22 to 24 July) took her to waters off Atlantic City, New Jersey. When her fourth (26 to 28 July) took her across Delaware Bay to Lewes, Delaware, she sported a new weapon – three depth charges. The fifth (29 July to 1 August) again took her to patrol the shipping lanes off Atlantic City.

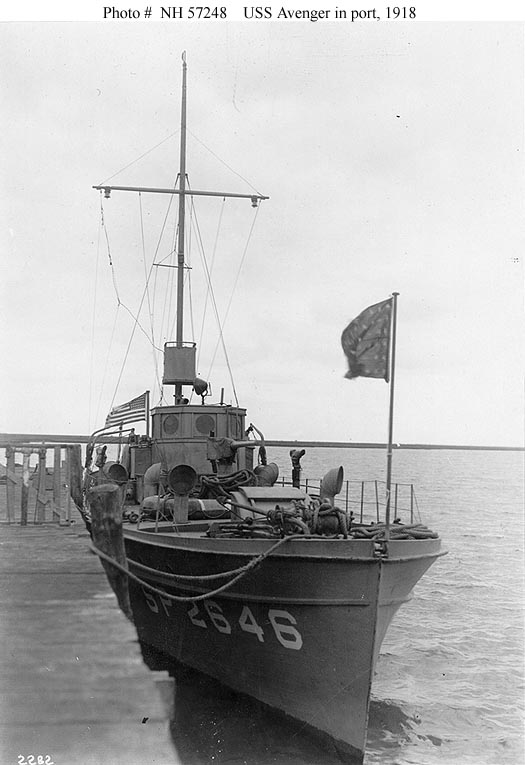

At 0825 on 7 August, Avenger had just commenced escorting a submarine when a muffler exploded on board. The damage apparently not severe enough to force the craft to curtail her assigned tasks, Avenger returned to Cape May that afternoon, remaining alongside the Fish Dock there until 12 August when she got underway, at the end of a towline, bound for Essington, Pennsylvania. Docking on the 13th, Avenger consequently underwent repairs to her hull and engines at Essington – a spell of yard work that lasted into early October 1918. During that time, so that her crew would not get "rusty" on their weapons, they conducted rifle and machine gun practice at the local yacht club rifle range.

After her post-repair trial trip to Marcus Hook and back on 9 October, and her second (record) trial trip to Wilmington, Delaware, and return, Avenger returned briefly to Essington before moving back to her home base, Cape May, on the afternoon of 25 October. Underway the next morning, she patrolled off Cape May on the 28th and into the next day, when she was relieved on station by Shrewsbury (SP-70). Avenger underwent further repairs to her engines (30 October to 2 November) before she departed the Fish Dock, Cape May, at 0955 on 7 November on what proved to be her last patrol of the war.

She made port back at Cape May on the 9th. Her deck log for 11 November recounts the happy news received that date: "State department announces armistice signed at 5 a.m., 11 November." Underway for Lewes on the 14th, Avenger returned to Cape May on the 30th and remained there a week before returning to the Corinthian Yacht Club, Essington, Pennsylvania, on 8 December. The next morning, she touched at Fort Mifflin to unload ammunition before mooring at pier 19, where her wireless outfit was removed and her three-pounder dismantled. She made port back at Cape May on the 9th. Her deck log for 11 November recounts the happy news received that date: "State department announces armistice signed at 5 a.m., November 11th." Underway for Lewes on the 14th, Avenger returned to Cape May on the 30th and remained there a week before returning to the Corinthian Yacht Club, Essington, Pennsylvania, on 8 December. The next morning, she touched at Fort Mifflin to unload ammunition before mooring at pier 19, where her wireless outfit was removed and her three-pounder dismantled.

=== Decommissioning ===
At noon on 19 December, Chief Boatswain's Mate Wunderle decommissioned Avenger and signed the receipt for the vessel, which was later delivered to her builder's yard, Clement A. Troth's, in Camden, where she was presumably prepared for civilian service.

After that brief stint as a commissioned craft of the United States Navy, Avenger then served under a succession of owners, but retained her original name throughout. She disappeared from American yacht registers after 1929.

== See also ==
- USS Victor (SP-1995): Another boat made by Clement A. Troth
