= 1934 Pennsylvania gubernatorial election =

- November 6, 1934
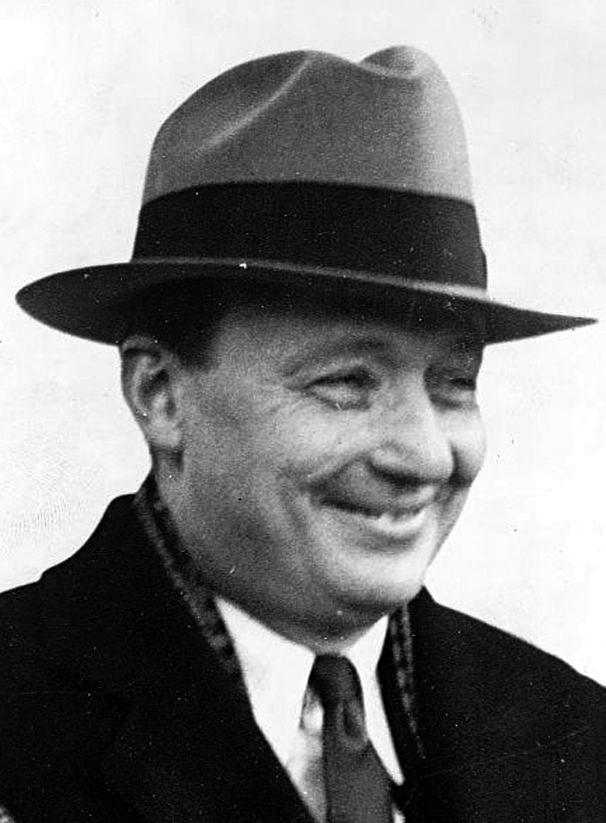

Nominee	George Earle	William A. Schnader
Party	Democratic	Republican
Popular vote	1,476,377	1,410,138
Percentage	50.04%	47.80%
- County results Earle: 40–50% 50–60% 60–70% Schnader: 40–50% 50–60% 60–70%
Governor before election
Gifford Pinchot
Republican
Elected Governor
George Earle
Democratic

The 1934 Pennsylvania gubernatorial election occurred on November 6, 1934. Incumbent Republican governor Gifford Pinchot was not a candidate for re-election.

The Democratic candidate, George Howard Earle III, defeated Republican candidate William A. Schnader to become Governor of Pennsylvania.

This was the first Pennsylvania gubernatorial election won by the Democratic Party since 1890.

== Background ==
Election eve was marred by the Kelayres massacre, in which a local, small-town, Republican boss and his family fired pistols, rifles and shotguns during a Democratic rally and parade, killing three, and leaving at least a dozen more seriously wounded. News of the attack was reported across the nation with front-page headlines.

In Pennsylvania, the attack was strongly politicized in Democratic newspapers and on the radio. There were numerous reports of Republicans voting Democratic due to the attack. Schnader, as incumbent Attorney General, was forced to comment on the attack in strong terms, and to the end of his life, believed the attack cost him the election.

== Democratic primary ==
=== Candidates ===
- Eugene C. Bonniwell, nominee for governor in 1926 and 1918
- Charles D. Copeland, judge of Westmoreland County, Pennsylvania
- George Howard Earle III, U.S. Minister to Austria
- William N. McNair, Mayor of Pittsburgh
- John A. McSparran, Pennsylvania Secretary of Agriculture and nominee for governor in 1922 (Note: Ran for the Republican Party nomination simultaneously)

=== Results ===
Democratic primary results Earle: 30%–40%; 40%–50%; 50%–60%; 60%–70%; 70%–80%; 80%–90%; Copeland: 30%–40%; 50%–60%; 60%–70%

Pennsylvania gubernatorial Democratic primary election, 1934
Party	Candidate	Votes	%
Democratic	George Howard Earle III	346,495	60.68
Democratic	Charles D. Copeland	93,355	16.35
Democratic	Eugene C. Bonniwell	59,524	10.42
Democratic	William N. McNair	39,451	6.91
Democratic	John A. McSparran	30,919	5.41
Write-in		1,323	0.23
Total votes		571,067	100.00

== Republican primary ==
=== Candidates ===
- Charles Avery Dravo
- Benjamin G. Eynon
- Tilghman E. Hauseman
- Louis G. Karzis
- Robert E. Lamberton
- Charles J. Margiotti, lawyer from Punxsutawney
- Harry S. McDevitt, judge of the court of common pleas of Philadelphia
- John A. McSparran, Pennsylvania Secretary of Agriculture and Democratic nominee for governor in 1922 (Note: Ran for the Democratic Party nomination simultaneously)
- Albert S. C. Millar
- Marion D. Patterson, judge of the court of common pleas of Blair County (withdrew on April 25 and endorsed Shannon)
- Thomas Wharton Phillips Jr., former U.S. Representative from Butler County and candidate for governor in 1926 and 1930
- William A. Schnader, Pennsylvania Attorney General
- Jay Williams Sechler
- Edward C. Shannon, Lieutenant Governor of Pennsylvania
- Edward L. Stokes, U.S. Representative from Philadelphia
- George Austin Welsh, U.S. District Court judge and former U.S. Representative from Philadelphia

=== Results ===
Republican primary results Schnader: 20%–30%; 30%–40%; 40%–50%; 50%–60%; 60%–70%; 70%–80%; Shannon: 20%–30%; 30%–40%; 40%–50%; 50%–60%; Margiotti: 20%–30%; 30%–40%; 50%–60%; Phillips: 40%–50%; 50%–60%; McSparran: 20%–30%

Pennsylvania gubernatorial Republican primary election, 1934
Party	Candidate	Votes	%
Republican	William A. Schnader	564,547	46.21
Republican	Edward C. Shannon	225,030	18.42
Republican	Charles J. Margiotti	198,323	16.23
Republican	Thomas Wharton Phillips Jr.	62,422	5.11
Republican	John A. McSparran	58,604	4.80
Republican	Benjamin G. Eynon	26,056	2.13
Republican	Harry S. McDevitt	17,386	1.42
Republican	Jay Williams Sechler	14,757	1.21
Republican	Louis G. Karzis	10,921	0.89
Republican	George Austin Welsh	10,114	0.83
Republican	Marion D. Patterson	9,096	0.74
Republican	Robert E. Lamberton	8,655	0.71
Republican	Albert S. C. Millar	6,904	0.57
Republican	Edward L. Stokes	3,577	0.29
Republican	Tilghman E. Hauseman	2,612	0.21
Republican	Charles Avery Dravo	1,959	0.16
Write-in		627	0.05
Total votes		1,221,590	100.00

== General election ==
=== Candidates ===
- Herbert T. Ames, former mayor of Williamsport (Prohibition)
- Emmett Patrick Cush (Communist)
- Bess Gyekis (Industrial Labor)
- George Howard Earle III, U.S. Minister to Austria (Democratic)
- Jesse H. Holmes (Socialist)
- William A. Schnader, Pennsylvania Attorney General (Republican)

=== Results ===
Pennsylvania gubernatorial election, 1934
Party	Candidate	Votes	%	±%
Democratic	George Howard Earle III	1,476,377	50.04	
Republican	William A. Schnader	1,410,138	47.80	
Socialist	Jesse H. Holmes	42,357	1.44	
Prohibition	Herbert T. Ames	13,521	0.46	
Communist	Emmett Patrick Cush	5,584	0.19	
Industrial Labor	Bess Gyekis	2,272	0.08	
Write-in		47	0.00	
Total votes		2,950,249	100.00%	
