= City Series =

The term City Series refers to baseball games played between several pairs of Major League Baseball teams based in the same city. One year's games have been understood as one multi-game competition, or series.

- City Series (Chicago), the historic exhibition and current interleague series between the Chicago Cubs and Chicago White Sox
- City Series (Philadelphia), the exhibition series between the Philadelphia Athletics and Philadelphia Phillies
