= Kalodner =

Kalodner is a surname. Notable people with the surname include:

- Harry Ellis Kalodner (1896–1977), American judge
- John Kalodner, American music executive
