= Pennsylvania Department of Revenue =

- Logo of the DOR

Agency overview
- Formed: 1927
- Jurisdiction: State government of Pennsylvania
- Headquarters: 11th Floor, Strawberry Square, Harrisburg, Pennsylvania; 40°15′43″N 76°52′52″W
- Agency executive: Pat Browne, Secretary of Revenue
- Website: www.revenue.pa.gov

The Pennsylvania Department of Revenue (DOR) is an agency of the U.S. state of Pennsylvania. The department is responsible for collecting all Pennsylvania taxes, including all corporate taxes and taxes on inheritance, personal income, sales and use, realty transfer, motor fuel, and all other state taxes.

== History ==
The Pennsylvania Department of Revenue was created in 1927 and began operating in 1929.

== Organizational structure ==
The DOR is composed of the following sub-units:

- Deputy Secretary of Revenue
  - Deputy Secretary for Taxation
    - Taxpayer Service and Information Center
    - Bureau of Corporation Taxes
    - Bureau of Individual Taxes
    - Bureau of Business Trust Fund Taxes
    - Bureau of Motor Fuel Taxes
    - Business Operations Office
  - Deputy Secretary for Tax Policy
    - Board of Appeals
    - Bureau of Audits
    - Bureau of Research
  - Deputy Secretary for Administration
    - Bureau of Administrative Services
    - Equal Opportunity Office
    - Bureau of Human Resources
    - Bureau of Fiscal Management
    - Bureau of Imaging and Document Management
  - Deputy Secretary for Compliance and Collections
    - Bureau of Collections and Taxpayer Services
    - Bureau of Compliance
    - Office of Criminal Tax Investigations
    - Pass Through Business Office
    - Bureau of Enforcement Planning, Analysis, and Discovery
  - Deputy Secretary for Information Technology
    - Office of e-Commerce
    - Bureau of Information Systems
- Office of Chief Counsel
- Press Office
- Pennsylvania Lottery
- Office of Legislative Affairs
- Policy Office and the Office of Taxpayers' Rights Advocate

== List of secretaries ==
Name	Dates served	Appointed by
Charles A. Johnson	1929–1931	John Stuchell Fisher
Clyde L. King	1931–1932	Gifford Pinchot
Leon D. Metzger	1932–1935	Gifford Pinchot
H. Edgar Barnes	1935	George Howard Earle
Harry Ellis Kalodner	1935–1936	George Howard Earle
Jack Kelly Sr.	1936–1937	George Howard Earle
J. Griffith Boardman	1937–1939	George Howard Earle
William J. Hamilton	1939–1941	Arthur James
Edward B. Logan	1942–1943	Arthur James
David W. Harris	1943–1948	Edward Martin
Otto F. Messner	1949–1955	James H. Duff
Gerald A. Gleeson	1955–1958	George M. Leader
Vincent G. Panati	1958	George M. Leader
Charles M. Dougherty	1959–1963	David L. Lawrence
Theodore B. Smith	1963–1967	William Scranton
Warner M. Depuy	1967–1971	Raymond P. Shafer
Robert P. Kane	1971–1974	Milton Shapp
Vincent X. Yakowicz	1974–1975	Milton Shapp
George J. Mowod	1975–1976	Milton Shapp
Milton E. Lopus	1976–1979	Milton Shapp
Howard A. Cohen	1979–1981	Dick Thornburgh
Robert K. Bloom	1981–1983	Dick Thornburgh
James I. Schemer	1983–1987	Dick Thornburgh
Barton Fields	1987–1989	Bob Casey Sr.
David L. Donahoe	1989–1991	Bob Casey Sr.
Eileen McNulty	1991–1995	Bob Casey Sr.
Robert A. Judge	1995–2000	Tom Ridge
Larry P. Williams	2000–2003	Tom Ridge
Gregory Fajt	2003–2007	Ed Rendell
Tom Wolf	2007–2008	Ed Rendell
Stephen Stetler	2009	Ed Rendell
C. Daniel Hassell	2010–2011	Ed Rendell
Dan Meuser	2011–2015	Tom Corbett
Eileen McNulty	2015–2017	Tom Wolf
C. Daniel Hassell	2017–2023	Tom Wolf
Pat Browne	2023–present	Josh Shapiro

== See also ==
- List of Pennsylvania state agencies
