= Harry Ellis Kalodner =

American judge (1896–1977)

Senior Judge of the United States Court of Appeals for the Third Circuit
- In office October 3, 1969 – March 15, 1977

Chief Judge of the United States Court of Appeals for the Third Circuit
- In office 1965–1966
- Preceded by: John Biggs Jr.
- Succeeded by: Austin Leander Staley

Judge of the United States Court of Appeals for the Third Circuit
- In office July 27, 1946 – October 3, 1969
- Appointed by: Harry S. Truman
- Preceded by: Charles Alvin Jones
- Succeeded by: Arlin Adams

Judge of the United States District Court for the Eastern District of Pennsylvania
- In office July 6, 1938 – September 3, 1946
- Appointed by: Franklin D. Roosevelt
- Preceded by: Albert Branson Maris
- Succeeded by: James P. McGranery

Pennsylvania Secretary of Revenue
- In office 1935 – January 6, 1936
- Governor: George Howard Earle III
- Preceded by: H. Edgar Barnes
- Succeeded by: Jack Kelly

Personal details
- Born: Harry Ellis Kalodner; March 28, 1896 Philadelphia, Pennsylvania
- Died: March 15, 1977 (aged 80) Philadelphia, Pennsylvania
- Education: University of Pennsylvania Law School (LLB)

Harry Ellis Kalodner (March 28, 1896 – March 15, 1977) was a United States circuit judge of the United States Court of Appeals for the Third Circuit and previously was a United States district judge of the United States District Court for the Eastern District of Pennsylvania.

== Education and career ==
Born in Philadelphia, Pennsylvania, Kalodner received a Bachelor of Laws from the University of Pennsylvania Law School in 1917. During the World War I era, he served from September 1918 to April 1919 and was a private in the United States Army Judge Advocate General's Department. He was in private practice in Philadelphia from 1917 to 1935. He was a staff member for the Philadelphia North American from 1919 to 1925. He was financial and political editor for The Philadelphia Record from 1928 to 1934. He was Pennsylvania secretary of revenue in 1935. He was a Judge of the Court of Common Pleas of Philadelphia County, Pennsylvania from 1936 to 1937.

== Federal judicial service ==
Kalodner received a recess appointment from President Franklin D. Roosevelt on July 6, 1938, to a seat on the United States District Court for the Eastern District of Pennsylvania vacated by Judge Albert Branson Maris. He was nominated to the same position by President Roosevelt on January 5, 1939. He was confirmed by the United States Senate on March 30, 1939, and received his commission on May 4, 1939. His service terminated on September 3, 1946, due to his elevation to the Third Circuit.

Kalodner was nominated by President Harry S. Truman on May 21, 1946, to a seat on the United States Court of Appeals for the Third Circuit vacated by Judge Charles Alvin Jones. He was confirmed by the Senate on July 25, 1946, and received his commission on July 27, 1946. He served as Chief Judge from 1965 to 1966. He was a member of the Judicial Conference of the United States in 1966. He assumed senior status on October 3, 1969. His service terminated on March 15, 1977, due to his death in Philadelphia.

== See also ==
- List of Jewish American jurists

== Sources ==
Legal offices
Preceded by Albert Branson Maris	Judge of the United States District Court for the Eastern District of Pennsylvania; 1938–1946	Succeeded by James P. McGranery
Preceded by Charles Alvin Jones	Judge of the United States Court of Appeals for the Third Circuit; 1946–1969	Succeeded by Arlin Adams
Preceded by John Biggs Jr.	Chief Judge of the United States Court of Appeals for the Third Circuit; 1965–1966	Succeeded by Austin Leander Staley
