= Harry S. McDevitt =

Harry Sylvester McDevitt (April 17, 1885 – February 11, 1950) was an American jurist who was a judge of the court of common pleas of Philadelphia from 1922 to 1950.

== Early life ==
McDevitt was born Henry Sylvester McDevitt in Philadelphia on April 17, 1885, to John J. and Ameila (Gardell) McDevitt. He later changed his name to Harry. While in high school he sorted the papers of Stephen Girard for the Girard Estate. He graduated from Central High School in 1905 and attended the University of Pennsylvania Law School for one year. He completed his legal studies by reading law.

== Early government service ==
While attending Penn, McDevitt was the university correspondent for The Philadelphia Press. He later served as the paper's city editor, then political editor. In 1911, McDevitt was appointed assistant executive controller by Governor John K. Tener. In 1913, he was appointed statistician for the state board of charities. In 1914, he became chairman of the newly-formed Pennsylvania Economy and Efficiency Commission. The following year, he became the commission's solicitor. In 1917, he was appointed special deputy Pennsylvania Auditor General by Charles A. Snyder and represented Snyder in a mandamus suit compelling him to pay state officials who had been reappointed to their offices after being rejected by the Pennsylvania Senate. In 1919, McDevitt became the private secretary of Governor William Cameron Sproul.

== Judicial career ==
On July 1, 1922, Sproul appointed McDevitt to the court of common pleas of Philadelphia. McDevitt was described by The Philadelphia Inquirer as an "outspoken, hard-driving jurist" and by the Baltimore Afro-American as a "stubborn, firey judge". He was known for both harsh sentences and support for prison reform. He was president of Prisoners' Family Welfare Association for many years.

In 1926, McDevitt presided over the trial of David L. Marshall, an unlicensed chiropractor who was charged with killing and dismembering one of his patients, Anna May Dietrich. After first alleging that she had committed suicide in his office, Marshall later said he accidentally choked her during an argument. During the trial, Marshall again changed his story, stating that she had died from a poison she had accidentally taken and he dismembered the body to avoid negative publicity. On March 10, he ended the trial and dismissed the jury after Marshall's attorneys informed McDevitt that they had represented a corporation with which the jury foreman was connected. Marshall was convicted of second degree murder and was sentenced by McDevitt to 10 to 20 years in Eastern State Penitentiary. McDevitt expressed regret that the Ludlow act prevented him from imposing a harsher minimum sentence.

On April 11, 1931, after 18 months of court proceedings, McDevitt placed the Philadelphia Rapid Transit Company in receivership. Citing mismanagement and not insolvency as the reason for the receivership, he instructed the receivers to cancel and undo the actions of Mitten Management, whom he called "financial vultures". His opinion was 211 pages long and cited numerous violations of the company's agreement with the city.

In 1931, McDevitt sentenced anti-Fascist activist Orlando Spartaco to two years in prison for heckling Italian Minister of Foreign Affairs Dino Grandi, stating that he hoped the verdict would "be an example to others in Philadelphia who have Communistic ideas". Spartaco appeal the decision and, against the wishes of Spartaco and his attorney, McDevitt furnished his $1,000 bail, so that Spartaco would not become "a Communistic martyr". McDevitt received threats following the verdict which led to police guarding him and his family. The sentence was overturned by the Supreme Court of Pennsylvania.

In 1935, he presided over Fred Waring's lawsuit against WDAS Broadcasting Co. over WDAS's unauthorized rebroadcast of a Waring performance.

In 1939, McDevitt presided over the first murder trial of Herman Petrillo, a leader of the Philadelphia poison ring. Following the trial, McDevitt stated that "no one can estimate the number of crimes committed to date or the ramification of the heinous murders" and wrote to J. Edgar Hoover to request the aid of the Federal Bureau of Investigation.

In 1940, McDevitt, James C. Crumlish, and Theodore Rosen heard the case of Tille Irelan, a 35-year old single mother who confessed to smothering and dismembering her 21-month old son. Irelan was sentenced to death in the electric chair, becoming only the third Philadelphia woman to ever receive a death sentence.

In 1941, McDevitt sentenced Isaiah "Stanky" Smith to 50 to 100 years in the Eastern State Penitentiary and his accomplice, Arthur Clisby to 40 to 80 years in the same prison, after the pair pleaded guilty to robbing 48 homes and sexually assaulting seven women at gunpoint. During sentencing, McDevitt called their crimes the "worst reign of terror that he had ever heard of" and called the pair "nothing more than inhuman beasts". He told the pair, who were black, that if their crimes had occurred "south of the Mason and Dixon's line, people of the community might have taken the law in their own hands". Smith's stepfather, David Williams, pleaded guilty to pawning items stolen by the pair, was sentenced to 7 1/2 to 15 years in Eastern Penitentiary, but after conferring with detectives, McDevitt reduced the sentence to 2 1/2 to 5 years.

In 1942, McDevitt granted numbers game operator Linwood "Georgia Rose" Powell and his chief lieutenant Charles Bowser a year's probation in exchange for the two donating $800 a piece to the "Buy A Bomber Fund".

In 1948, McDevitt ruled that the Broadwood Hotel and a North Philadelphia movie theater could not charge admission to view a television broadcast of the second Joe Louis vs. Jersey Joe Walcott boxing match without the permission of the owners of the television rights.

== Politics ==
McDevitt was very open regarding his political opinions. He was an anti-communist and supported the legalization of parimutuel betting on horse racing in Pennsylvania. In 1933, McDevitt supported African-American John P. Turner's appointment to the Philadelphia Board of Education, which led to him receiving a letter of protest from the Ku Klux Klan.

McDevitt was a Republican candidate in the 1934 Pennsylvania gubernatorial election. He finished seventh in the sixteen candidate primary with 1% of the vote.

== Other work ==
McDevitt served as president of the Friendly Sons of St. Patrick. During the 1928 Sesquicentennial Exposition, he addressed a crowd of 75,000 at an Irish Day celebration at Sesquicentennial Stadium.

McDevitt was a prominent figure in the Philadelphia sports scene, serving as chairman of the Philadelphia Junior Baseball Federation and president of the Philadelphia Police Athletic League and the Middle Atlantic Amateur Athletic Union. In 1934, McDevitt ruled in favor of the Philadelphia Athletics during their dispute with city treasurer Will Hadley over a liquor licence for Shibe Park. In 1939, the City Series between the Athletics and Philadelphia Phillies was played for the Judge Harry S. McDevitt trophy. In 1944, he was reported to be interested in succeeeding Kenesaw Mountain Landis as Commissioner of Baseball if Landis retired. In 1949, as president of the Middle Atlantic AAU, McDevitt ruled that sprinter Barney Ewell had forfeited his amateur status by accepting a furnished house as a gift from fans.

McDevitt served as president of the Frederick Douglass Memorial Hospital's board of directors for over five years. He led the hospital's fundraising drive and helped reduce its indebtedness to $7,000. In 1945, McDevitt, a Catholic resigned over his obejction to the hospital's Eugenics Clinic, which provided birth control.

During World War II, McDevitt was executive director of the Philadelphia Council of Defense. His civilian defense volunteers were criticized by Dr. Wharton Sinkler, chief resident of Episcopal Hospital, for failing to provide first aid to victims of the 1943 Frankford Junction train wreck. McDevitt countered that the volunteers were not trained in first aid, but were focused on getting the injured to hospitals as quickly as possible and noted that they had not received any complaints from the other hospitals that treated the accident victims.

After the War, McDevitt headed Mayor Bernard Samuel's fair rent committee.

== Personal life ==
In 1917, McDevitt married Emily Caldwell Eggleston. They had two sons, Richard and Henry. The family resided in Philadelphia's Germantown neighborhood. McDevitt detested cigarette smoking and had no smoking signs in 24 languages in his office. His hobbies included horseback riding and gardening.

== Death ==
McDevitt fell ill on February 11, 1950, and spent the six weeks in Thomas Jefferson University Hospital, where he was treated by a heart specialist. He appeared to have recovered and traveled to Atlantic City, New Jersey on March 28. He again fell ill and died of a heart attack in his hotel room on April 22, 1950.
