= Felix N. Gerson =

American author (1862–1945)

Felix Napoleon Gerson (October 18, 1862 – December 13, 1945) was a Jewish-American author, journalist, and newspaper editor from Philadelphia.

== Life ==
Gerson was born on October 18, 1862, in Philadelphia, Pennsylvania, the son of Aaron Gerson and Eva Goldsmith. His father was a German immigrant.

Gerson attended public school and the Boys' Central High School, after which he studied civil engineering. He worked for the Philadelphia and Reading Railroad Company at the Port Richmond Coal Terminal from 1880 to 1890 and was ultimately promoted to Department Chief Clerk. During railroad strikes that hit Philadelphia and New York City in 1887, he was assigned to the coal docks of New York Harbor and was able to end the strike. He also worked as a writer and correspondent for different journals, and in December 1890 he became Managing Editor of the Chicago edition of The American Israelite. He returned to Philadelphia in the summer of 1891 and became business manager of The Jewish Exponent. He was also on the staff of The American Musician from 1885 to 1890 and Freund's Music and Drama from 1896 to 1903. He wrote a volume of poems called "Some Verses" in 1893, and a number of his essays, sketches, and poems appeared in the Jewish and general periodical press.

Gerson became managing editor of The Jewish Exponent in 1908, retaining that position until 1936. He became president of the paper in 1919, and he still held that office by 1941. He was also a staff writer for the Philadelphia Public Ledger from 1895 to 1916, and in 1902 he became a publication committee member of the Jewish Publication Society of America. He translated several German books into English, including Ruben Rothgiesser's The Ship of Hope, Raphael Straus' History of the Jews in Regensburg and Augsburg, and Franz Landsberger's Rembrandt, the Jews and the Bible. The latter translation was published in 1946, after his death.

In 1892, Gerson married Emily Goldsmith. Their children were Cecilia (wife of Malvin H. Reinheimer) and Dorothy. Following Emily's death, he married Emma Brylawski in 1937. His sister-in-law was Rose Goldsmith Stern, a prominent Jewish clubwoman in Philadelphia.

Gerson died at home on December 13, 1945. His funeral was held at the Chelten Hills crematory.
