= T. McKeen Chidsey =

American politician

Thomas McKeen Chidsey
- Photo, c. 1950

Associate Justice of the Supreme Court of Pennsylvania
- In office July 6, 1950 – April 19, 1958

Attorney General of Pennsylvania
- In office January 21, 1947 – July 5, 1950
- Governor: James H. Duff
- Preceded by: James H. Duff
- Succeeded by: Charles J. Margiotti

Personal details
- Born: January 26, 1884 Easton, Northampton County, Pennsylvania, Pennsylvania
- Died: April 19, 1958 (aged 74) Philadelphia, Pennsylvania
- Party: Republican
- Spouse: Ellen Lea
- Children: 2
- Education: Lafayette College, University of Pennsylvania Law School
- Occupation: Judge, lawyer

Thomas McKeen Chidsey (January 26, 1884 – April 19, 1958) was a Pennsylvania lawyer and judge. He served a term as the state's Attorney General, and was an associate justice of the state's Supreme Court.

== Life and career ==
Chidsey was born the son of Andrew Dwight and Emily McKeen Chidsey. He was admitted to the bar in 1907. In 1913, he married Ellen Lea, and they had two daughters.

He was District Attorney for Northampton County, 1920–23. He was appointed Attorney General in 1947. He was appointed in 1950 to fill a vacancy on the state's Supreme Court, and was then elected to a full 21-year term. He died in 1958.

Legal offices
Preceded by James H. Duff	Attorney General of Pennsylvania; 1947–1950	Succeeded by Charles J. Margiotti
