= Dan Meuser =

American businessman and politician (born 1964)

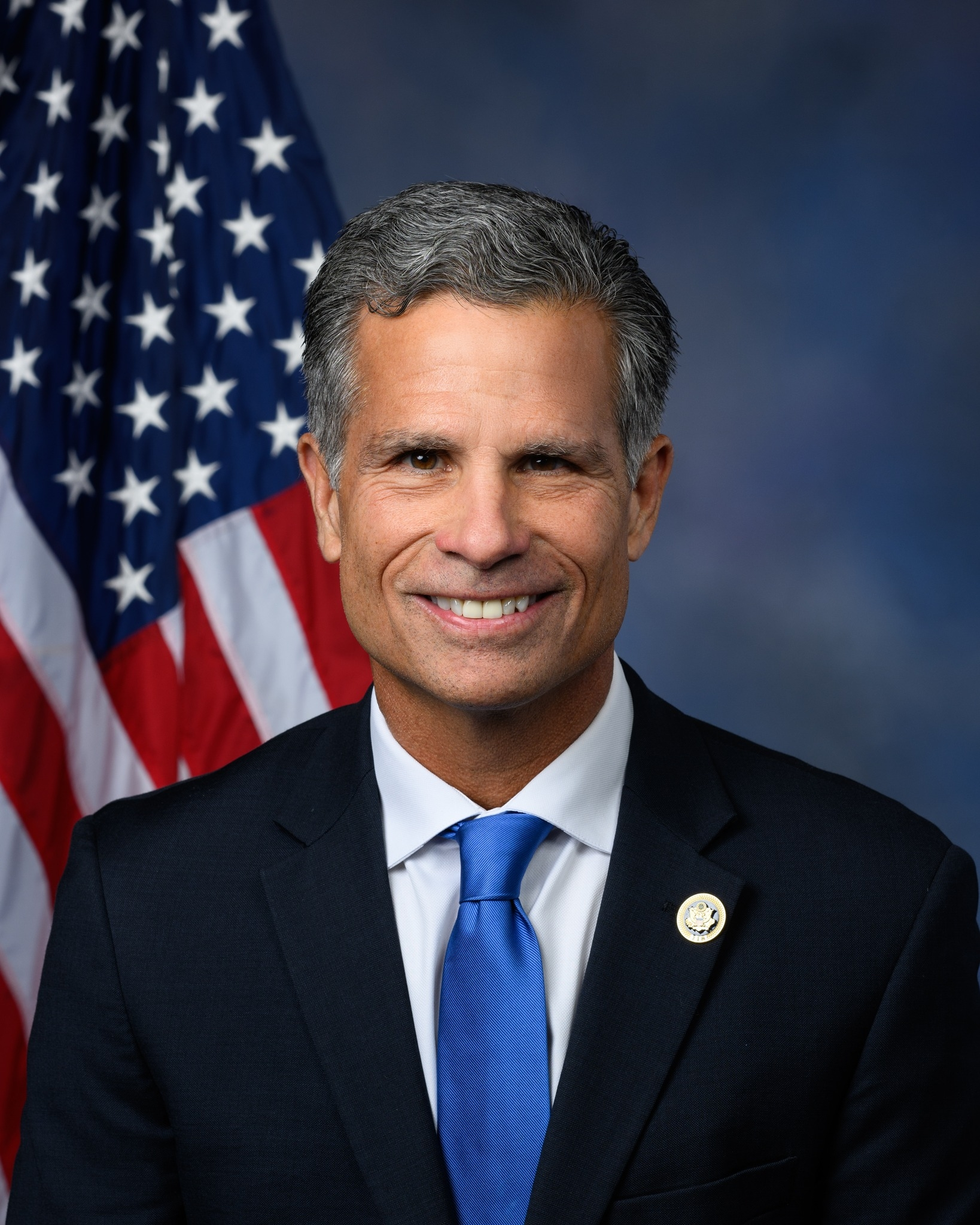
- Official portrait, 2024

Member of the U.S. House of Representatives from Pennsylvania's 9th district
- Incumbent
- Assumed office January 3, 2019
- Preceded by: Lou Barletta (redistricted)

Secretary of Revenue of Pennsylvania
- In office January 18, 2011 – January 20, 2015
- Governor: Tom Corbett
- Preceded by: Daniel Hassell (acting)
- Succeeded by: Eileen McNulty

Personal details
- Born: Daniel Philip Meuser; February 10, 1964 (age 62) New York City, New York, U.S.
- Party: Republican
- Spouse: Shelley Van Acker
- Children: 3
- Education: State University of New York, Maritime College (attended); Cornell University (BA)
- Website: House website Campaign website

Daniel Philip Meuser (/ˈmjuːzər/ MEW-zər; born February 10, 1964) is an American businessman and politician serving as the U.S. representative for Pennsylvania's 9th congressional district since 2019. A Republican, he previously served as the secretary of revenue in the cabinet of Pennsylvania governor Tom Corbett. He was previously president of the Pride Corporation, a manufacturer of motorized wheelchairs in the Wilkes-Barre/Scranton metro area of Pennsylvania, and currently serves the company as a board member and consultant.

On January 6, 2021, Meuser was among the 147 Republican members of Congress who voted against the certification of the results of the 2020 United States presidential election.

== Business career ==
Meuser was an executive at Pride Mobility Products, a business he built with his brother Scott and his father Stan. His brother, Scott Meuser, is the chairman and CEO of the company. Meuser left the company in August 2008 to pursue a career in public service. He had worked there since 1988. Although he left his position, he remained on the company's board of directors. During Meuser's tenure at Pride, the company grew from $2 million in sales to over $400 million. In 2002, Pride paid $80,000 to settle a government investigation that a Pride customer referral program intended to connect interested consumers with Pride product retailers was not compliant because retailers were required to pay Pride between $10 and $25 per referral as opposed to a flat annual fee.

== Early political career ==
Meuser was appointed Secretary of Revenue by Governor Tom Corbett after more than two decades in the private sector. In 2010, Politics Magazine called Meuser a "Former congressional candidate and northeast PA money man". Pennsylvania residents speculated about his appointment by Corbett given that he was one of the largest donors to Corbett's 2009–2010 campaign, making a total of 26 contributions totaling $76,394. There is concern over a recent $103 million computer modernization system for the Pennsylvania Department of Revenue being performed by Accenture, a global technology consultant that the state of Maryland had previously fired by for a similar project due to wasteful spending and missed deadlines.

== U.S. House of Representatives ==
=== Elections ===
==== 2008 ====
Meuser was a candidate for the GOP nomination in Pennsylvania's 10th congressional district, having announced the launch of his campaign in September 2007. He lost the Republican primary to fellow businessman Chris Hackett, who went on to lose to Democratic incumbent Chris Carney in November 2008. Meuser heavily underscored his conservative values, referencing Ronald Reagan and emphasizing his work at Pride Mobility as part of a larger effort to embrace small-scale government and low taxes. The endorsements he received included many prominent Pennsylvania conservatives, including former U.S. senator Rick Santorum and then-Hazleton mayor Lou Barletta.

Hackett attacked Meuser for hiring undocumented immigrants at Pride Mobility and funding prominent national Democratic politicians. In 1997, Pride Mobility was fined $41,000 for hiring three undocumented immigrants in 1995; the fine was reduced to $23,000 after Pride Mobility appealed. The individuals in question had presented false documentation to Pride before technology like E-Verify was available. Pride took the incident seriously and took steps to ensure they wouldn't recur.

The discovery that Hackett had previously hired an undocumented immigrant as a maid in his home—though he claimed to have dismissed her once he learned of her status—was perceived to seriously damage his image. On the night of the primary, the very close returns—despite initially displaying a comfortable Meuser lead—soon indicated a virtual tie for much of the night, with little more than 100 votes separating the candidates at one point. But as time passed, Hackett took a lead. By roughly 11:15 p.m. ET, local news media and the Associated Press projected Hackett as the winner, with 52% of the vote to Meuser's 48%.

When Meuser ran for the 10th congressional district in 2008, he lived in the 11th congressional district, where Lou Barletta was running for Congress against incumbent Paul Kanjorski. Meuser promised that he would actually live in the district by the time voters cast their ballots in the primary election; he had purchased a house in Harvey's Lake, which is in the 10th district. He still resides in Dallas, Pennsylvania.

"I am running because I love my country and I want a government people can have faith in again. My twenty-five years in business and four years as PA Secretary of Revenue have given me the experiences necessary to be an effective, conservative member of Congress."

— Dan Meuser

==== 2018 ====
Meuser won the 2018 general election for Pennsylvania's 9th congressional district with 59.7% of the vote, versus Denny Wolff's 40.3%.

In October 2017, Meuser announced that he would run as a Republican to represent Pennsylvania's 9th congressional district. The district had previously been the 11th, represented by Lou Barletta, who was running for the United States Senate.

In March 2018, over 100 members of the Lebanon County Republican Committee endorsed Meuser. Meuser "strongly backed" President Donald Trump's "America First agenda".

The Republican primary candidates were Meuser, Scott Uehlinger and George Halcovage. The Democratic candidates were Susan Quick, Denny Wolff and Gary Wegman. The primary election was held on May 15, 2018.

On April 18, 2018, the Making America Great PAC endorsed Meuser. The PAC's chairman said, "Dan is a business-minded problem solver, a conservative, and he is focused on results, not rhetoric. Dan will go to Washington and join President Trump to fight for the America First Agenda."

In early May 2018, the Republican Committee of Columbia County met with all three candidates running for the 9th congressional district seat. After a series of questions about their campaign priorities, the committee voted to support Meuser.

Among Meuser's local endorsements were Shamokin mayor John Brown and city councilman Dan McGaw.

Before a debate in Berks County, Meuser told opponent Denny Wolff to "go to hell", which he originally denied before later acknowledging.

In May 2018, Meuser's campaign announced an initiative called "Women for Meuser", a group of women supporters of Meuser for Congress. Meuser was endorsed by at least 31 prominent elected or politically active women, including state senator Lisa Baker, television host Tiffany Cloud, state representative Tarah Toohil, state representative Karen Boback, and Luzerne County district attorney Stefanie Salavantis.

==== 2020 ====
Meuser was reelected in 2020 with 66.3% of the vote, defeating Gary Wegman.

=== Tenure ===
In December 2020, Meuser joined over 120 Republican members of the House of Representatives in signing an amicus brief in support of a Texas lawsuit that sought to invalidate Pennsylvania's 2020 presidential election votes. The Pennsylvania Attorney General called the case a "seditious abuse of the judicial process". The Supreme Court issued orders on December 11, declining to hear the case on the basis that Texas lacked standing under Article III of the Constitution to challenge the results of an election held by another state.

In August 2021, LegiStorm reported that Meuser had violated the Stop Trading on Congressional Knowledge (STOCK) Act of 2012, a federal transparency and conflict-of-interest law, by failing to properly disclose stock trades made by his wife and children in March 2021 worth as much as $600,000.

Meuser was a candidate to be the Republican Party nominee for Speaker of the House in the October 2023 Speaker of the United States House of Representatives election, but dropped out on October 23, 2023.

=== Committee assignments ===
- Committee on Education and Labor
  - Subcommittee on Higher Education and Workforce Investment
  - Subcommittee on Health, Employment, Labor, and Pensions
- Committee on Veterans' Affairs
  - Subcommittee on Health
  - Subcommittee on Economic Opportunity
- Committee on the Budget

=== Caucus memberships ===
- House Aluminum Caucus
- Congressional Candy Caucus
- Bipartisan Military Depot and Industrial Facilities Caucus
- House Small Brewers Caucus
- Congressional Fire Services Caucus
- Congressional Coal Caucus
- Congressional Chemistry Caucus
- Copper Caucus
- Congressional Cigar Caucus
- Congressional Ukraine Caucus
- Servicewomen & Women Veterans Congressional Caucus
- House Paper and Packaging Caucus
- Republican Main Street Partnership
- Republican Study Committee
- Problem Solvers Caucus
- United States–China Working Group

== Political positions ==
=== Abortion ===
Meuser opposes legalized abortion and has called fetuses "pre-born human persons". According to his campaign, "Dan has personally funded chartered buses to take people from our area to the annual March for Life Rally in Washington, D.C." He opposes federal funding for abortion and federal health coverage that includes abortion services. He also believes that "equal protection must be granted to each born and pre-born human person via the United States Constitution under the 14th Amendment".

=== Defense and military ===
Meuser supported Trump's plan to increase defense spending by $54 billion. He also supported the travel ban on countries that Trump implemented, with his campaign saying, "We cannot allow individuals to enter our country without knowing enough about their identity and background and the need to improve our immigration vetting processes, end visa overstays and examine the issues of chain migration. We can no longer stand by and allow individuals we know little about from countries hell-bent on destroying America enter our country."

=== Donald Trump ===
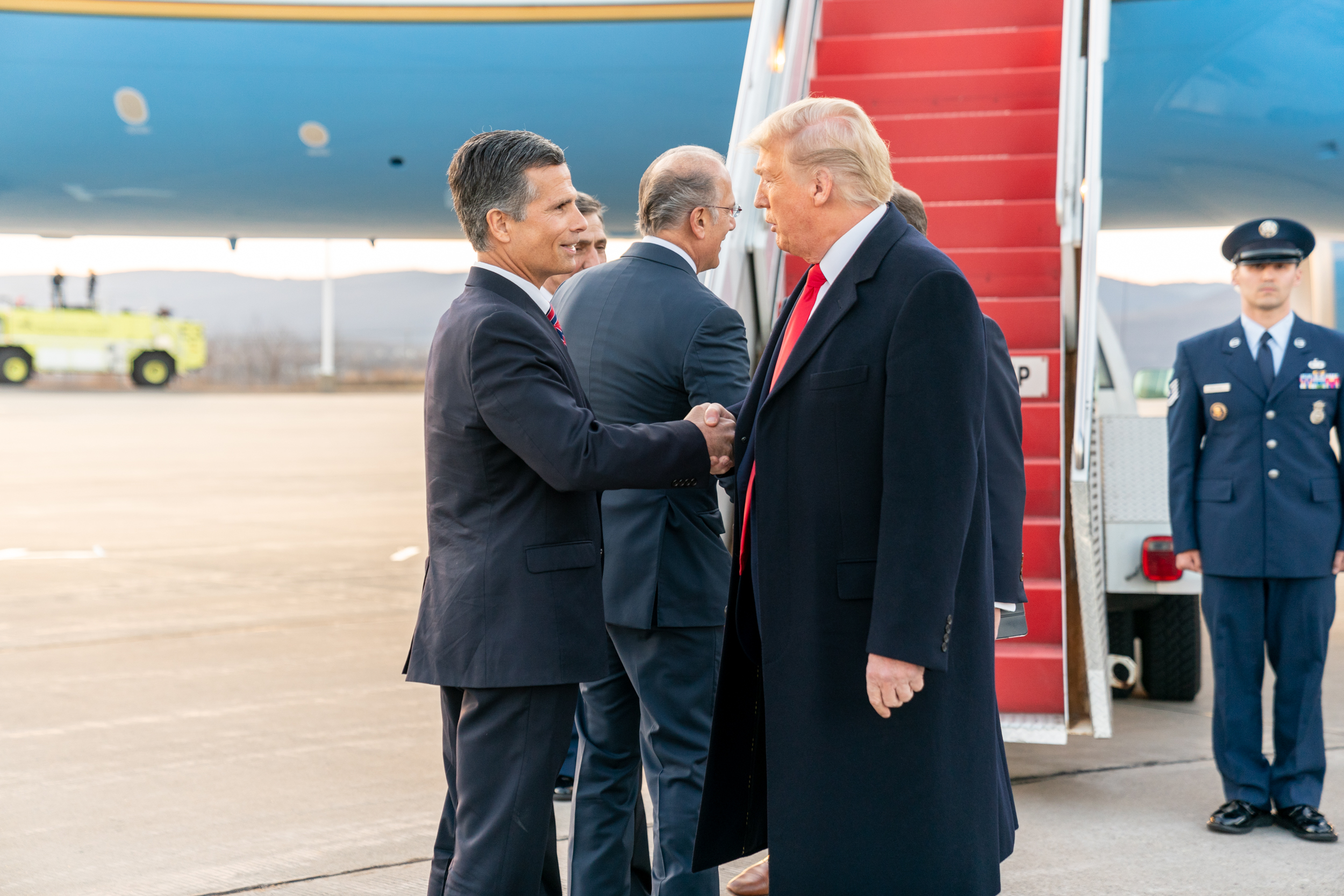
Meuser greeting President Donald Trump in March 2020

As the House of Representatives was debating HR 489 in July 2019, which passed 240 - 187, condemning Trump for promoting racism and xenophobia after he attacked four Democratic members of Congress, telling them to "go back" to the "places from which they came," Meuser defended Trump and called the bill a baseless attack by Democratic leadership. "I strongly oppose Democrat leadership's latest effort to harass [Trump]. For years, he and his supporters have been subjected to baseless attacks. Such slander is a disservice to our nation and the American people, and I am tired of it." The tweet from which the quote is sourced contained a video in which Meuser, standing on the House floor, said, "I rise today in opposition of House Resolution 489."

In December 2020, Meuser joined over 120 House Republicans in signing an amicus brief in support of a Texas lawsuit that sought to invalidate Pennsylvania's 2020 presidential election votes. Following the storming of the U.S. Capitol building by Trump supporters, Meuser voted to reject the certification of Pennsylvania's electoral votes in the 2020 presidential election. He voted against impeaching Trump on an article of impeachment of "incitement of insurrection" in the aftermath of the attack on the Capitol. In May 2021, Meuser voted against the creation of an independent commission to investigate the January 6 attack.

In 2024, Meuser labelled Trump's New York hush money trial as "a blatant attempt to undermine democracy" and "sham trial".

=== Drugs ===
Meuser supported Trump's declaration of the opioid epidemic as a national health emergency. He has proposed a three-pronged approach: supply (by increasing the standards by which prescription opioids are prescribed), harm reduction (by having medication drop off programs in communities and by incrementing electronic databases for monitoring opioid prescriptions), and recovery (by coordinating efforts to help non-violent drug offenders become rehabilitated as productive members of society). Meuser voted against the MORE Act, which would have removed cannabis from the federal Controlled Substances Act.

=== Gun rights ===
Meuser supports an individual right to keep, own, use and carry firearms, earning an endorsement from at least one pro-gun Political Action Campaign.

=== Immigration ===
Meuser supported Trump's proposal to construct a wall on the entire border with Mexico. He opposes giving federal funds to sanctuary cities. Meuser has argued that President Obama's executive order on Deferred Action for Childhood Arrivals (DACA) was unconstitutional and supports ending DACA. He also supports the government cracking down on employers who knowingly hire illegal immigrants.

Meuser sponsored H.R. 6202, the American Tech Workforce Act of 2021, introduced by Representative Jim Banks. The legislation would establish a wage floor for the high-skill H-1B visa program, thereby significantly reducing employer dependence on the program. The bill would also eliminate the Optional Practical Training program that allows foreign graduates to stay and work in the United States.

=== LGBT rights ===
On July 19, 2022, Meuser was one of 47 Republican representatives who voted for the Respect for Marriage Act, which would codify the right to same-sex marriage in federal law. Meuser said, "My vote in support of H.R. 8404 was to affirm the current law and support the rights and freedoms of all Americans. The passage of this legislation reflects current law, which was upheld by a Supreme Court ruling nearly 10 years ago. This vote was not difficult for me, as it does not infringe upon anyone’s personal and religious rights." However, Meuser voted against final passage on December 8, 2022.

=== Taxes ===
Meuser believes that school property taxes are un-American and unconstitutional, his campaign stating "no tax should have the power to leave you homeless." He has also cited the 14th amendment in arguing that the government has no right to take property away from someone without due process of law or providing equal protections under the law.

Meuser signed the "Taxpayer Protection Pledge" sponsored by Americans for Tax Reform. The pledge commits its signers to "oppose any and all efforts to increase the marginal income tax rates for individuals and/or businesses ... and oppose any net reduction or elimination of deductions and credits, unless matched dollar for dollar by further reducing tax rates".

=== Texas v. Pennsylvania ===
In December 2020, Meuser was one of 126 Republican representatives to sign an amicus brief in support of Texas v. Pennsylvania, a lawsuit filed at the United States Supreme Court contesting the results of the 2020 presidential election, in which Joe Biden defeated Trump. The Supreme Court declined to hear the case on the basis that Texas lacked standing under Article III of the Constitution to challenge the results of an election held by another state.

=== Ukraine ===
In 2023, Meuser was among 98 Republicans to vote for a ban on cluster munitions to Ukraine.

In 2023, Meuser voted for a moratorium on aid to Ukraine.

=== Veterans ===
Meuser supports the Veterans Choice Act, legislation passed during the Obama administration and extended by Congress during the Trump administration. The policy allows veterans who face long waiting times at VA facilities or live over 40 miles away from the nearest VA clinic to seek care in the private sector, and have the cost of that care covered.

== Electoral history ==
=== 2018 ===
Republican primary results
Party	Candidate	Votes	%
Republican	Dan Meuser	26,568	53.0
Republican	George Halcovage Jr.	12,032	24.0
Republican	Scott Uehlinger	11,541	23.0
Total votes		50,141	100.0

Pennsylvania's 9th congressional district, 2018
Party	Candidate	Votes	%
Republican	Dan Meuser	148,723	59.7
Democratic	Denny Wolff	100,204	40.3
Total votes		248,927	100.0
Republican hold			

=== 2020 ===
Pennsylvania's 9th congressional district, 2020
Party	Candidate	Votes	%
Republican	Dan Meuser (incumbent)	232,988	66.3
Democratic	Gary Wegman	118,266	33.7
Total votes		351,254	100.0
Republican hold			

=== 2022 ===
Pennsylvania's 9th congressional district, 2022
Party	Candidate	Votes	%
Republican	Dan Meuser (incumbent)	209,185	69.3
Democratic	Amanda Waldman	92,622	30.7
Total votes		301,807	100.0
Republican hold			

=== 2024 ===
Pennsylvania's 9th congressional district, 2024
Party	Candidate	Votes	%
Republican	Dan Meuser (incumbent)	276,212	70.5
Democratic	Amanda Waldman	115,523	29.5
Total votes		391,735	100.0
Republican hold			

== Personal ==
Meuser was born in Flushing, Queens, on February 10, 1964, and grew up in Babylon, New York. He is married to Shelley Van Acker Meuser. They have three children. He once claimed a home in Kingston Township, Pennsylvania as his residence, but changed his registration to a home in Dallas, Pennsylvania two months before the election. The Kingston home had been drawn into the 8th district after the Pennsylvania Supreme Court threw out Pennsylvania's old congressional map as an unconstitutional gerrymander. According to Meuser, his old home had been drawn just a mile outside the new 9th's borders. Meuser is Roman Catholic.

Meuser is a board member of the Greater Pittston Chamber of Commerce, sits on the board of trustees for Misericordia University, and is on the board of the Pittston Young Men's Christian Association. Meuser is a donor to such organizations as United Way, Make-A-Wish Foundation, MS Society, St Jude Hospital, and St. Joseph's Hospital.

U.S. House of Representatives
Preceded by Bill Shuster	Member of the U.S. House of Representatives from Pennsylvania's 9th congressional district 2019–present	Incumbent
U.S. order of precedence (ceremonial)
Preceded by Lucy McBath	United States representatives by seniority 214th	Succeeded by Carol Miller
