= USS Victor (SP-1995) =

Victor-class patrol boat

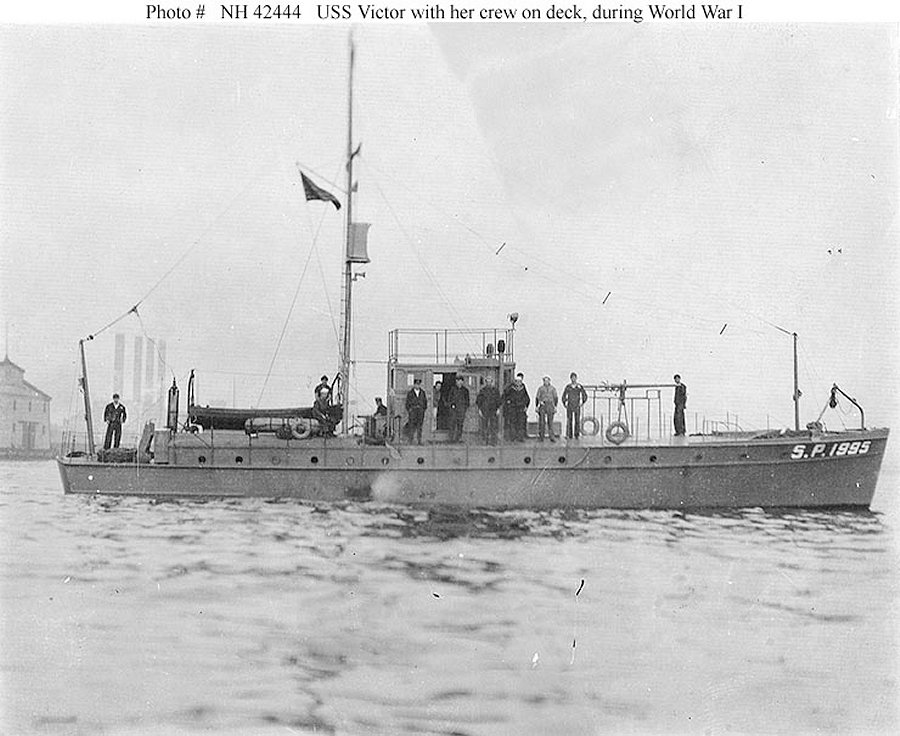

History

United States
- Laid down: date unknown
- Launched: 1917
- Acquired: 27 November 1917
- Commissioned: 26 December 1917
- Decommissioned: 21 November 1918
- Stricken: date unknown
- Fate: Returned to owner

General characteristics
- Displacement: 50 tons
- Length: 71 ft 6 in (21.79 m)
- Beam: 15 ft (4.6 m)
- Draught: 3 ft 3 in (0.99 m) (mean)
- Speed: 12 knots
- Complement: 10
- Armament: one 3" gun mount, two machine guns

USS Victor (SP-1995) was a Victor-class patrol boat acquired by the U.S. Navy for the task of patrolling and defending the East Coast of the United States during World War I.

Victor, a wooden-hulled motor-boat constructed at Camden, New Jersey, by Clement A. Troth, and completed in 1917, was leased by the Navy on 27 November 1917 from George H. Earle, Jr., of Haverford, Pennsylvania; and commissioned on 26 December 1917.

== World War I service ==
Operating out of Cape May, New Jersey, Victor patrolled the entrance to Delaware Bay for the duration of the war. During her naval service, two incidents stood out to enliven her otherwise uneventful routine; and both occurred in February 1918.

== Engine room explosion ==
While the boat was on patrol on the 10th of the month, an explosion in the vessel's engine room started a fire at 1530. The crew fought the flames with fire extinguishers and formed a bucket brigade back to the stern. Not having a Wireless, Victor hoisted distress signals—including an upside down national ensign—fired a gun to attract attention to her plight, and sounded her klaxon horn. Meanwhile, her small boat was manned, lowered, and sent out to obtain assistance as the fire made enough headway to convince some on board that their chance of putting it out was slim.

Members of the crew not fighting the fire began to construct a makeshift raft out of doors, tops of berths, hatchways, and tables, while still others moved ammunition astern to prevent its catching fire and exploding. All life preservers were moved on deck, ready for use. However, the dogged efforts of the firefighters brought the blaze under control by 1605; and it was completely extinguished by 1610. Soon thereafter, USS Emerald (SP-177) arrived on the scene and towed Victor back to port for repairs.

== Rescuing crashed seaplane pilot and passenger ==
On 25 February, while Victor lay at anchor at the section base, a seaplane, piloted by Ens. Walker Weed, USNRF, tried to make a landing at Cold Spring Inlet, but instead fell on the opposite side of the base, on the beach. An explosion followed the crash, and the plane burst into flames with its occupants still on board. Sounding "man overboard," Victor and Emerald sent boats shoreward with rescue parties.

The pilot, Ensign Weed, his clothes afire, stumbled from the blazing aircraft and plunged headlong into the water to extinguish the flames. Meanwhile, his passenger, named Bennett, staggered out of the fire but passed out before he could reach the water's edge. Victor's men ran to his aid, extinguished the fire, and saw to it that the injured flyer's wounds were dressed and treated.

== Final duties ==
Victor remained on harbor entrance patrol duties at Cape May, New Jersey, until four days before the armistice which ended the war in Europe. Shifted then to Delaware River patrol duties in the area of the antisubmarine nets, Victor sailed for Camden, New Jersey. She was decommissioned there on 21 November 1918 and returned to her owner.

== See also ==
- USS Avenger (SP-2646): Another boat made by Clement A. Troth
