= Rose Goldsmith Stern =

American clubwoman (1866–1931)

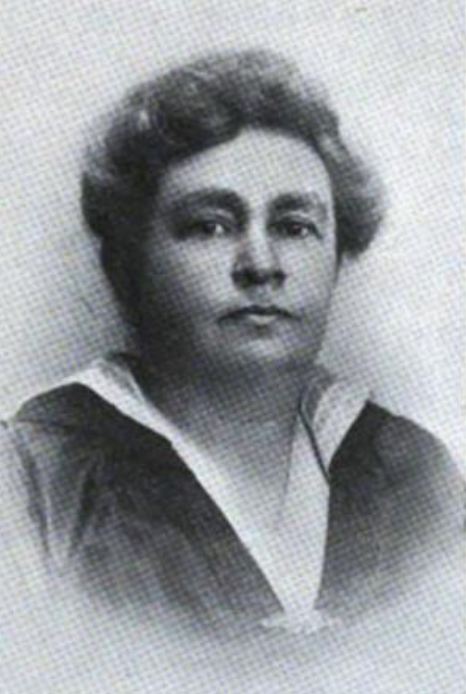
- Rose Goldsmith Stern, from a 1922 publication
- Born: Rose Goldsmith; October 19, 1866; Philadelphia
- Died: January 24, 1931 (64 years); Philadelphia
- Occupations: Clubwoman, advocate for deaf education
- Spouse: Sidney Morris Stern
- Relatives: Felix N. Gerson (brother-in-law); Horace Stern (brother-in-law)

Rose Goldsmith Stern (October 19, 1866 – January 24, 1931) was an American clubwoman. She was a chair of the National Council of Jewish Women and an advocate for deaf education and for supports for deaf veterans of World War I.

== Early life and education ==
Rose Goldsmith was born in Philadelphia, the daughter of Abraham Goldsmith and Cecilia Adler Goldsmith. Both of her parents were German-Jewish immigrants to the United States. Her brother Milton Goldsmith was a writer; her sister Emily married journalist Felix N. Gerson.

== Career ==
Stern was chair of Welfare Work for the Deaf of the National Council of Jewish Women, and wrote several articles for national publications on deaf education and on the needs of deaf veterans of World War I. "Is it not time that the public should be enlightened on the subject of the ability and efficiency of those who, normal and intelligent in every respect, lack only the sense of hearing?" she asked in 1918. "It is this misunderstanding and consequent lack of sympathy that forms the greatest obstacle in the path of the deaf, and that, in the interest of our returning heroes, must be avoided."

In 1919, Stern visited the military hospital at Cape May, and arranged for the printing of a Jewish prayer book for deaf soldiers. She organized the Jewish Deaf Society of Baltimore in 1920, and was manager of the Beth Israel Association of the Deaf.

== Publications ==
- "The Problem of the Training of a Deaf Child as Viewed by a Mother" (1918)
- "Our Deafened Soldiers: A Problem of the Near Future" (1918)
- "The Problem of the Deaf: From an Educational Standpoint" (1922)

== Personal life ==
Rose Goldsmith married jeweler Sidney Morris Stern in 1892. They had three sons, Sylvan, Allan and Howard. Their firstborn son, Sylvan, was deaf, and attended the Pennsylvania Institution for the Deaf and Dumb in Philadelphia. She died in 1931, at the age of 64, in Philadelphia. Her brother-in-law Horace Stern was chief justice of the Supreme Court of Pennsylvania.
