= Eileen McNulty =

American politician (born 1952)

Secretary of Revenue of Pennsylvania
- In office June 10, 2015 – April 21, 2017
- Governor: Tom Wolf
- Preceded by: Dan Meuser
- Succeeded by: C. Daniel Hassell
- In office 1991–1995
- Governor: Bob Casey Sr.
- Preceded by: David L. Donahoe
- Succeeded by: Robert A. Judge

Personal details
- Born: Eileen Healy; October 6, 1952 (age 73) Detroit, Michigan, U.S.
- Spouse: Arthur F. McNulty
- Children: 3
- Education: Michigan State University (BA)

Eileen Healy McNulty (born October 6, 1952) is a former government official from the Commonwealth of Pennsylvania in the United States.

She served as Pennsylvania Secretary of Revenue from 1991 to 1995 in the cabinet of Pennsylvania Governor Robert P. Casey and in the cabinet of Governor Tom Wolf as Pennsylvania Secretary of Revenue, a post which she held until her retirement on April 21, 2017.

== Early life ==
McNulty was born in Detroit, Michigan to Joan Frances and Thomas Henry Healy. She graduated cum laude from Michigan State University with a Bachelor of Arts degree in economics in 1974.

== Career ==
McNulty started her career as an economic analyst in the Michigan Department of Management and Budget from 1973 to 1977. From there, she served as executive director of the Pennsylvania House of Representatives finance committee from 1977 to 1980, and later as a senior financial analyst with the appropriations committee from 1985 to 1987. In that year, McNulty was appointed as Deputy Secretary of Revenue, which she served until 1988.

From 1991 to 1995, McNulty served as Pennsylvania Secretary of Revenue in the cabinet of Pennsylvania Governor Robert P. Casey. She then served in the Pennsylvania Office of the Budget from 2011 until 2013.

Nominated in 2015 by Pennsylvania Governor Tom Wolf to be the Pennsylvania Secretary of Revenue, her appointment was confirmed by the Pennsylvania Senate in June 2015.

During her tenure as head of the Pennsylvania Department of Revenue, she oversaw the planning and implementation of an identity theft division to protect commonwealth residents from tax fraud and help victims recover from identity theft crimes. The initiative reportedly saved the commonwealth more than six million dollars in 2016 alone. In addition, she oversaw her agency's redesign of its business service operations, a project which included the creation of an internet site that businesses could use to pay their taxes online.

In February 2017, she announced a tax amnesty program in an effort to encourage delinquent taxpayers who owed more than $1.1 billion in taxes to make their payments without having to pay fees for lien filings. It was her final administrative project as Secretary of Revenue. She retired from commonwealth service on April 21, 2017.

== Personal life ==
McNulty is married to Arthur F. McNulty and has three children. During her first tenure as Secretary of Revenue, their residence was in New Cumberland.
