= Sara Soffel =

American lawyer and judge (1886–1976)

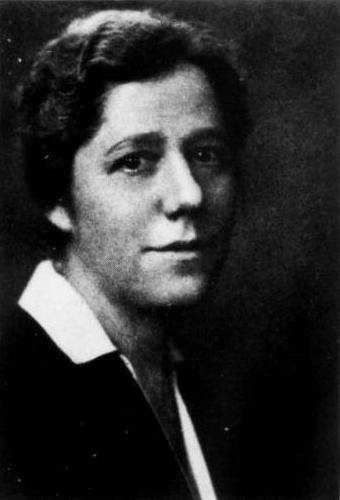
- Born: Sara Mathilde Soffel; October 27, 1886; Pittsburgh, Pennsylvania, US
- Died: October 5, 1976 (aged 89); Pittsburgh, Pennsylvania
- Education: Wellesley College, University of Pittsburgh School of Law
- Occupations: Lawyer, judge
- Known for: Pennsylvania's first woman judge

Sara Mathilde Soffel (October 27, 1886 – October 5, 1976) was an American lawyer and judge from Pennsylvania. She was Pennsylvania's first woman judge, serving on the Allegheny County Courts from 1930 to 1941 and on the Pennsylvania Common Pleas Court from 1942 to 1962. In 1939, she was the first woman to run for the Supreme Court of Pennsylvania.

== Early life and education ==
Soffel was born in Pittsburgh, the youngest of three daughters of Jacob and Catharine (Ulrich) Soffel. Both of her parents were German immigrants. Her mother died while she was a child. Her father was a merchant and realtor who served as an alderman and court tipstaff "whose accounts of courtroom dramas fascinated his daughter." Her eldest sister, Catherine Soffel, worked as a high school principal, while her middle sister, Phoebe Soffel, helped to manage their father's business.

Soffel graduated as valedictorian from Central High School and received her Bachelor of Arts degree with highest honors in 1908 from Wellesley College, where she played on the field hockey team. For the next five years she taught Latin at the Central, Schenley, and Crafton public high schools in Pittsburgh and additionally coached basketball at Central High School, where she proudly declared that hers was the finest girls' basketball team in western Pennsylvania in 1911.

In 1916, Soffel became one of the first women to graduate from the University of Pittsburgh School of Law (and the first woman to attend Pittsburgh for the entirety of her legal studies). She graduated at the top of her class, which according to custom meant the school would award her a cash prize and a teaching appointment. She received only the money.

== Lawyer and judge ==
Soffel was admitted to the Allegheny County Bar on October 6, 1916. No law firm in the city would hire her, so in September 1917, she set up her own independent law practice and learned how to type and write shorthand so she could do her own clerical work. From 1922 to 1926 she was the first woman to work as assistant solicitor for the City of Pittsburgh. She served as director of the Bureau of Women and Children in the State Department of Labor and Industry from 1929 to 1930.

On August 27, 1930, Governor John S. Fisher appointed Soffel to fill a judicial vacancy, making her a county court judge for Allegheny County. The following year, she easily won election to a regular ten-year term of office, leading a crowded field to garner the most votes ever received for a county court judge in Allegheny County.

In 1939, Soffel became the first woman to run for a seat on the Supreme Court of Pennsylvania. Her campaign was largely self financed and she did not receive support from either major party, with the Republicans backing Marion D. Patterson and the Democrats supporting Herbert Funk Goodrich. She ran in both parties' primaries and garnered 743,090 votes (442,788 in the Republican race and 299,302 in the Democratic election). Combined, she had more votes than any other candidate, but did not receive a majority in either race. In both her 1930 and 1939 election bids, renowned suffragist Hannah J. Patterson served as her campaign manager.

In November 1941, Soffel became the first woman elected to Alleghany County's common pleas court, which handled major civil and criminal cases. Her most controversial ruling happened in 1946, when she issued an injunction to limit picketing during a United Steelworkers national strike, a decision later upheld by the state supreme court. She remained in office until retiring from the bench in December 1961. She then went into private practice at a Pittsburgh law firm before retiring for good in 1968.

Soffel was the first woman to join the Board of Trustees of the University of Pittsburgh. She received an honorary Doctor of Laws degree from Pennsylvania College for Women in 1945. She also held an honorary degree from Wilson College. She held various leadership roles in the Wellesley College Alumnae Association.

== Personal life ==
Soffel never married and had no children. Her recreational pursuits included fishing, climbing mountains, and watching baseball (she was a fan of the Pittsburgh Pirates).

While not considered a radical, Soffel approved of family planning in an era when contraception was a hot-button issue. She was a founding member of the Women's City Club and a member of the Twentieth Century Club, Pittsburgh Wellesley Club, American Association of University Women, and Professional Women's Club.

She died at Wightman Health Center in the Squirrel Hill neighborhood of Pittsburgh in 1976 at the age of 89.
