= Horace Stern =

American judge (1878–1969)

Chief Justice of the Supreme Court of Pennsylvania
- In office November 1, 1952 – December 29, 1956
- Preceded by: James B. Drew
- Succeeded by: Charles Alvin Jones

Justice of the Supreme Court of Pennsylvania
- In office January 6, 1936 – November 1, 1952

Personal details
- Born: August 7, 1878 North Philadelphia, Pennsylvania, U.S.
- Died: April 15, 1969 (aged 90)
- Relations: Henry Friendly (son-in-law); Rose Goldsmith Stern (sister-in-law)
- Education: University of Pennsylvania (BA, LLB)

Horace Stern (August 7, 1878 – April 15, 1969) was the chief justice of the Supreme Court of Pennsylvania from 1 November 1952 to 29 December 1956. He became chief justice after serving on the court from 6 January 1936.

== Biography ==
Stern was born to a Jewish family in North Philadelphia, one of eight children. He graduated from the University of Pennsylvania in 1899, and from the University of Pennsylvania Law School summa cum laude in 1902.

Prior to his elevation to the bench, Stern was a professor at University of Pennsylvania Law School, where his portrait still hangs today. He went on to co-found of the law firm of Wolf, Block, Schorr & Solis-Cohen (later called WolfBlock) in 1903, before taking an appointment to the Philadelphia County Court of Common Pleas in 1920.

Stern was the first Jew to serve on the Pennsylvania Supreme Court and the second Jewish trustee of the University of Pennsylvania (and first since Moses Levy, whose term as trustee started in 1802 and ended in 1826). He was also very active within Philadelphia's Jewish community, having served as president of the Federation of Jewish Charities (now the Jewish Federation of Greater Philadelphia) and having been a founder of the American Jewish Committee.

Stern's daughter Sophie Stern married Henry Friendly in 1930. Stern's brother Sidney was married to clubwoman Rose Goldsmith Stern.
