= City Series (Philadelphia) =

Former Major League Baseball rivalry

- Philadelphia Athletics Philadelphia Phillies
- First meeting: 1883 (NL vs AA); 1892 (NL vs EL); April 6, 1903 (NL vs AL); Columbia Park; Phillies 2, Athletics 0
- Latest meeting: 1890 (NL vs AA); 1892 (NL vs EL); June 28, 1954 (NL vs AL); Connie Mack Stadium; Phillies 3, Athletics 2
- Stadiums: Athletics (AA): Jefferson Street Grounds (1883–1890); Athletics (EL): Philadelphia Baseball Grounds (1892); Athletics (AL): Shibe Park (1909–1954); Columbia Park (1901–1908); Phillies (NL): Shibe Park (1938–1970); National League Park (1887–1938); Recreation Park (1883–1886)

The City Series was the name of a series of intracity baseball games played between Major League Baseball's Philadelphia Athletics of the American League and its predecessors, and the Philadelphia Phillies of the National League that ran from 1883 through 1954. While the games were officially exhibitions, they were a matter of prestige in Philadelphia and a long rivalry existed between the players, management, and fans.

The Athletics moved to Kansas City in 1955 which ended the Philadelphia City Series rivalry. Contemporary fans, along with the Phillies and Athletics franchises, have recognized and celebrated their shared history in different commemorations.

== 1883–1890 ==
As early as 1887, the preseason series between the "Athletic and Philadelphia Clubs" had been recognized as an annual institution dating to 1875.

The first City Series featuring the Phillies was held in 1883 between the new League club and the American Association Philadelphia Athletics.

== 1892 ==
The Phillies and Eastern League Philadelphia Athletics met for the local championship in 1892 at Philadelphia Ball Park where both teams played their home games.

== 1903–1938 ==
The American League was established in 1901 and the Philadelphia Athletics were founding member and immediately rivaled the Phillies for city fans. The two teams did not play each other in 1901 and 1902 due to legal warring between the National League and American League. In September 1902, a post season series between the Phillies and Athletics was floated which was endorsed by Phillies manager Bill Shetsline who recalled the Phillies' 1883 series against the American Association Athletics. The series however, would not come to be and the Phillies played other local clubs.

The rivalry between the Phillies and American League Athletics started with the establishment of the American League in 1901. Superstar Nap Lajoie had played for several years on the Phillies, but was displeased with the salary cap of $2,400 placed by the National League. When the Athletics were established, Lajoie quit the Phillies and signed with the A's. In response, the Phillies filed an injunction lawsuit preventing Lajoie from playing on any other team. The case was ruled that Lajoie was barred from playing in Pennsylvania and Lajoie was sent to the Cleveland Bluebirds due to the financial assistance Cleveland had provided for the A's early on. In 1903, the injunction was dropped when the NL and AL made peace. Lajoie went on to have an outstanding Hall of Fame career. Eventually, he did return to the A's at the twilight of his career.

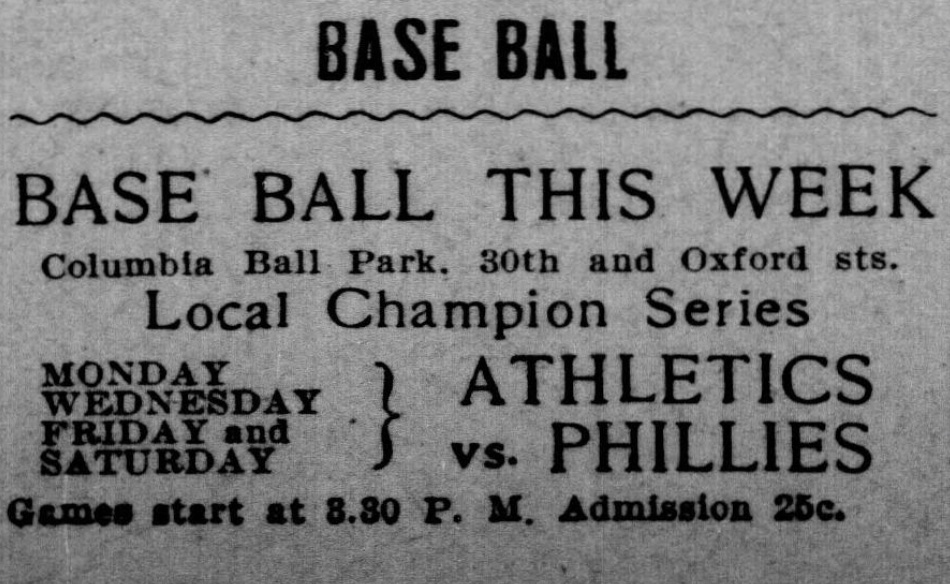
April 1906 "Local Champion Series" games at Philadelphia Athletics' Columbia Park

The Philadelphia Inquirer noted, "For the first time in thirteen years two local teams, representing rival base ball organizations, will come together in a friendly struggle for supremacy of the Quaker City." The Athletics had won the 1902 American League pennant, the Phillies had been newly acquired by John Rogers in February 1903, and interest was high.

Prior to the start of the series, the Athletics players threatened not to play unless they were paid a percentage of the gate receipts. Connie Mack refused his players on the grounds that while their contracts stipulated they receive gate receipts from mid-season exhibition games, the games against the Phillies would be prior to the start of the official season and unpaid exhibition games as much as any preseason contest.

The first City Series game between the American League Athletics and Phillies was played on Monday, April 6, 1903 at Columbia Park. The Phillies' Fred Mitchell beat the Athletics' Rube Waddell 2 to 0 in 10-innings in front of 6,543 fans.

The Phillies and A's would play both a spring and fall series in 1903. The Phillies took four of five games in the spring.

With Baker Bowl in disrepair following the collapse of a section of bleachers on August 8, 1903, all of the post-season games were played at Columbia Park. The A's won four of the seven games.

In 1905, the A's and Phillies only played the spring series as the A's were in the 1905 World Series against the New York Giants. The two teams played eight games between April 1 and April 12, 1905, alternating games between the A's Columbia Park and the Phillies' Philadelphia Park. The teams split the 1905 series four games to four.

Seven games were scheduled for April 1909. Shibe Park was being completed for its grand-opening so the Phils and A's played the entire series at the Phillies' Baker Bowl. The teams played six games with the Phillies winning five.

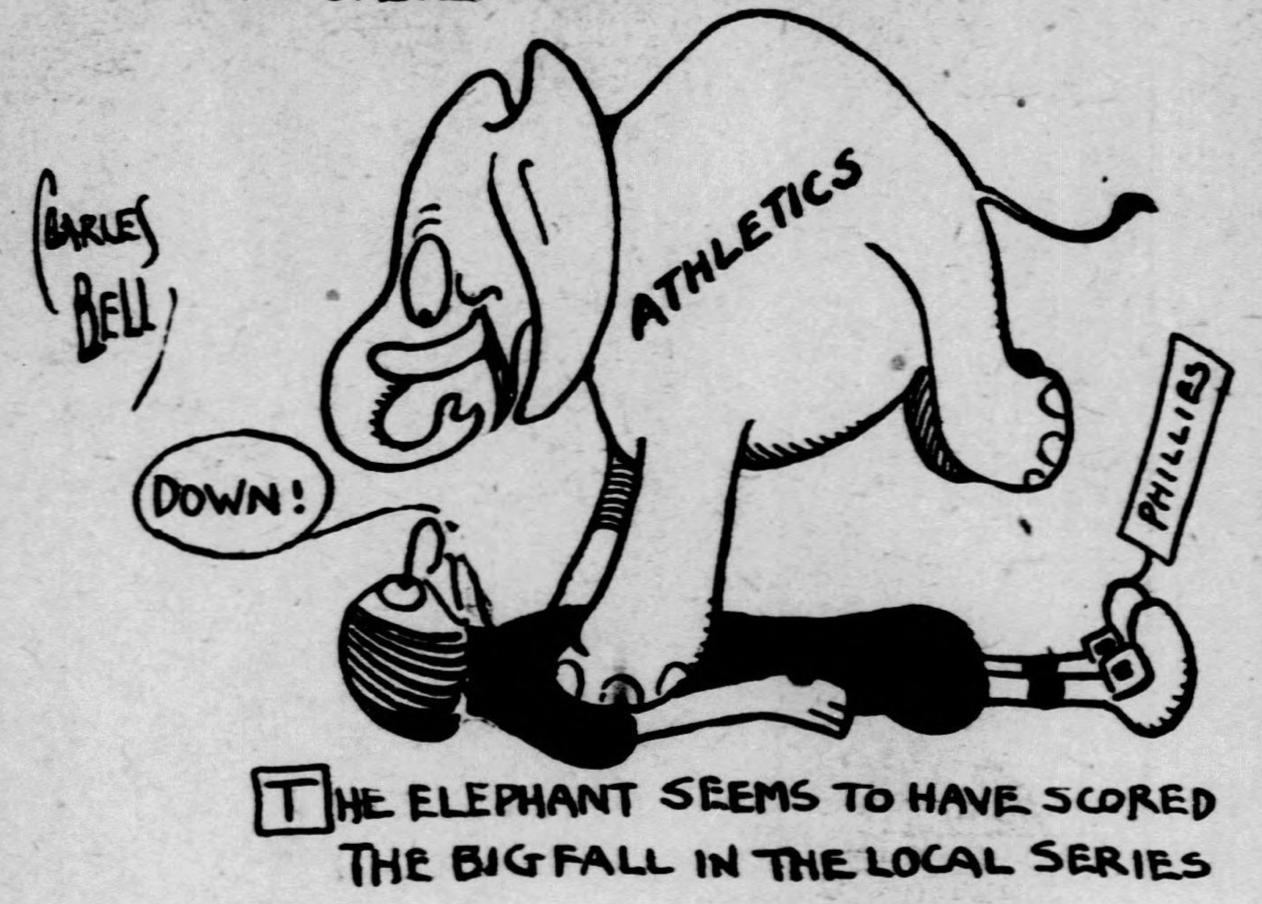
Philadelphia Inquirer, April 10, 1911

Phillies Hall of Fame pitcher Grover Cleveland Alexander made his Philadelphia debut during the pre-season 1911 Series. Alexander pitched five-innings of no-hit no-run baseball. He would make his official Major League debut on April 15, 1911.

The City Series took a hiatus in 1916 and 1917. The relationship between the Athletics and Phillies was severed in 1915 following a dispute between management and a spring training match up in the south was cancelled. Simultaneously, A's manager Connie Mack and Phillies manager Pat Moran feared their players injuring themselves in Philadelphia's cold weather and supported not playing.

The teams agreed to play one game in April 1918 at National League Park as a benefit to the family of respected sportswriter Billy Weart who had died at age 46 in December 1917. Wert had grown up in Philadelphia, and risen to be secretary-treasurer of the Baseball Writers' Association of America. The game was postponed by weather to July 18, 1918, with the gate receipts benefiting Weart's family. The Phillies and Athletics would return to play a five game series in April 1919.

William Baker, Phillies owner from 1913 until 1930, had declared that only games played in Philadelphia counted in the City Series, and would not include spring training meetings in the standings which he considered practice games. This practice continued even after Baker's death in 1930.

The Philadelphia Inquirer reported in 1932 and in 1937 that the winner of the City Series was awarded the Harry A. Mackey cup, named for Harry Mackey, mayor of Philadelphia from 1928 to 1931, and a former college athlete.

== 1938–1954 ==
In 1939, the Series was played for the Judge Harry S. McDevitt trophy, named for a Philadelphia common pleas court judge active in Philadelphia sports.

From 1948 through 1954, the Athletics and Phillies played a mid-season exhibition game for the benefit of the Junior Baseball Federation of Philadelphia. The proceeds from the game were distributed for the benefit of amateur baseball to the city's Police Athletic League, Department of Recreation, Fairmount Park, American Legion, and the Sandlot Sports Association.

The winner of the Series in 1949, the Athletics, were awarded the Ellis A. Gimbel Trophy, named for a member of the Gimbel family.

The 1950 series was planned for three games prior to Opening Day. Snow flurries and cold weather caused the cancellation of the first game. The Athletics beat the Phillies 7–4 in the first game and the Phillies won the following game 11–2.

The Phillies and Philadelphia Athletics played their final game against each other on June 28, 1954 at their shared ballpark renamed Connie Mack Stadium before the 1953 season. The Phillies beat the Athletics 3–2 in front of 15,993 fans.

== 1955–1967 ==
The Athletics moved to Kansas City prior to the 1955 season. The A's, now based in Kansas City, traveled to Philadelphia at the end of spring training to play pre-season exhibitions against the Phillies. The A's beat the Phillies in the second game, 10–2, at Wilmington Park, home of the original Wilmington Blue Rocks.

The Athletics continued to hold spring training in Florida through 1968 in West Palm Beach and then Bradenton which meant the franchises continued to face each other in Florida in spring training. The Athletics moved to Oakland after the 1967 season and two teams played each other in spring training for the last time in 1968.

== Contemporary legacy ==
The Phillies continued to play at Connie Mack Stadium through 1970 and moved to Veterans Stadium in 1971. In 1978 the Phillies created the Philadelphia Baseball Wall of Fame through which they honored a great Philadelphia Phillies and Philadelphia Athletics player on an annual basis at Veterans Stadium.

Veterans Stadium closed after the 2003 season and the Phillies moved only the Phillies wall plaques to Citizens Bank Park In March 2004, the Athletics' plaques were relocated to the Philadelphia Athletics Historical Society in Hatboro, Pennsylvania, and a single plaque listing all of the A's inductees was attached to the statue of Connie Mack located across the street from Citizens Bank Park.

The Athletics played the Phillies for the first time in interleague play in June 2003 at Veterans Stadium. The Phillies invited former A's Eddie Joost and Gus Zernial to the games. Connie Mack's daughter Ruth Mack Clark attended the first game. Former Florida U.S. Senator Connie Mack III, Mack's grandson, threw out the first ball.

The Phillies played the Athletics in Oakland in June 2005. The A's invited Eddie Joost to throw out the first pitch before the series opening game on June 17, 2005.

In 2011 the Athletics visited the Phillies at Citizens Bank Park for an interleague series in which the Phillies took two out of three games.

The Phillies and Athletics were scheduled to have played a three game series at Citizens Bank Park June 12–14, 2020 and the Phillies planned a "1920s City Series Retro Night" for June 12. The series was cancelled due to the Coronavirus pandemic that shortened the 2020 Major League Baseball season.

The Athletics visited the Phillies for both teams opening series in 2022, with the Phillies winning two out of three games. Due to a rules change before the start of the 2023 season, the Athletics will come to Philadelphia every other year.

=== Season-by-season results ===
Athletics vs. Phillies Season-by-Season Results
2000s (Athletics, 5–4)

Season	Season series		at Oakland Athletics	at Philadelphia Phillies	Overall series	Notes
2003	Phillies	2‍–‍1	no games	Phillies, 2‍–‍1	Phillies; 2‍–‍1	
2005	Athletics	2‍–‍1	Athletics, 2‍–‍1	no games	Tie; 3‍–‍3	
2008	Athletics	2‍–‍1	Athletics, 2‍–‍1	no games	Athletics; 5‍–‍4	Phillies win 2008 World Series

2010s (Athletics, 5–4)

Season	Season series		at Oakland Athletics	at Philadelphia Phillies	Overall series	Notes
2011	Phillies	2‍–‍1	no games	Phillies, 2‍–‍1	Tie; 6‍–‍6	
2014	Athletics	2‍–‍1	Athletics, 2‍–‍1	no games	Athletics; 8‍–‍7	
2017	Athletics	2‍–‍1	no games	Athletics, 2‍–‍1	Athletics; 10‍–‍8	

2020s (Phillies, 8–4)

Season	Season series		at (Oakland) Athletics	at Philadelphia Phillies	Overall series	Notes
2022	Phillies	2‍–‍1	no games	Phillies, 2‍–‍1	Athletics; 11‍–‍10	Phillies lose 2022 World Series
2023	Phillies	3‍–‍0	Phillies, 3‍–‍0	no games	Phillies; 13‍–‍11	Permanent adoption of the three-game series format, with each ballpark alternating every season.
2024	Athletics	2‍–‍1	no games	Athletics, 2‍–‍1	Phillies; 14‍–‍13	
2025	Phillies	2‍–‍1	Phillies, 2‍–‍1	no games	Phillies; 16‍–‍14	
2026	Phillies	2‍–‍1	no games	Phillies, 2‍–‍1	Phillies; 18‍–‍15	

Summary of Results

Season	Season series		at Athletics	at Philadelphia Phillies	Notes
Oakland Athletics vs. Philadelphia Phillies	Phillies	14‍–‍13	Tie, 6‍–‍6	Phillies, 8‍–‍7	
Athletics vs. Philadelphia Phillies	Phillies	4‍–‍2	Phillies, 2‍–‍1	Phillies, 2‍–‍1	Athletics in West Sacramento, California
Regular season games	Phillies	18‍–‍15	Phillies, 8‍–‍7	Phillies, 10‍–‍8	

== See also ==
- Major League Baseball rivalries
