= Charles Alvin Jones =

American judge (1887–1966)

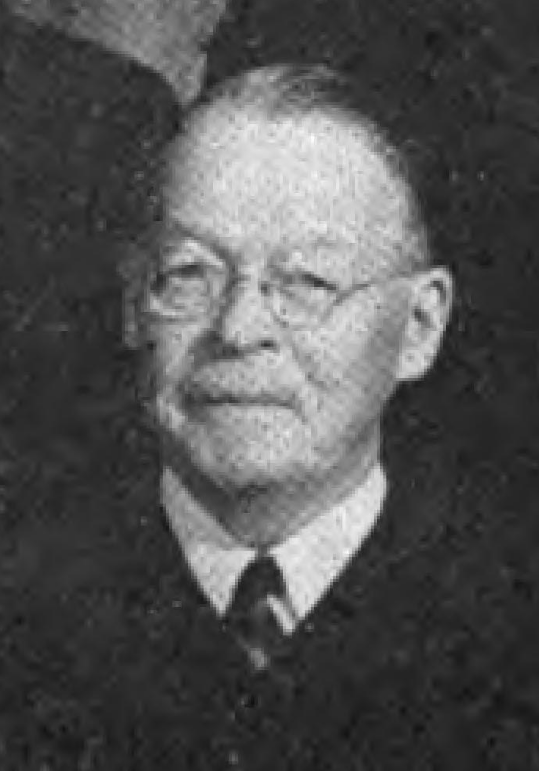

Chief Justice of the Pennsylvania Supreme Court
- In office December 29, 1956 – July 31, 1961
- Preceded by: Horace Stern
- Succeeded by: John C. Bell Jr.

Justice of the Pennsylvania Supreme Court
- In office January 3, 1945 – July 31, 1961

Judge of the United States Court of Appeals for the Third Circuit
- In office July 25, 1939 – December 31, 1944
- Appointed by: Franklin D. Roosevelt
- Preceded by: John Warren Davis
- Succeeded by: Harry Ellis Kalodner

Personal details
- Born: Charles Alvin Jones; August 27, 1887 Newport, Pennsylvania
- Died: May 21, 1966 (aged 78) Wynnewood, Pennsylvania
- Party: Democratic
- Education: Dickinson School of Law (LLB)

Charles Alvin Jones (August 27, 1887 – May 21, 1966) was a United States circuit judge of the United States Court of Appeals for the Third Circuit and chief justice of the Supreme Court of Pennsylvania.

== Education and career ==
Born on August 27, 1887, in Newport, Perry County, Pennsylvania, Jones attended the Newport schools, Mercersburg Academy and Williams College, then received a Bachelor of Laws from Dickinson School of Law (now Penn State Dickinson Law). He was admitted to the Perry County bar in 1910, before entering private practice in Pittsburgh, Pennsylvania from 1910 to 1939. He served in the American Ambulance Service with the French Army in 1917. He served in United States Naval Aviation as an ensign from 1918 to 1919. In 1938, Jones ran for Governor of Pennsylvania as the endorsed Democratic candidate, but lost to Arthur James by nearly 300,000 votes.

== Federal judicial service ==
Jones was nominated by President Franklin D. Roosevelt on July 14, 1939, to a seat on the United States Court of Appeals for the Third Circuit vacated by Judge John Warren Davis. He was confirmed by the United States Senate on July 18, 1939, and received his commission on July 25, 1939. His service terminated on December 31, 1944, due to his resignation.

== Pennsylvania Supreme Court service ==
Jones was elected to the Supreme Court of Pennsylvania in November 1944 and took his seat on January 3, 1945, as the only Democrat on the court. He served as a Justice until 1966, serving as chief justice from 1956 to 1961; he retired in 1961 due to deteriorating vision.

=== Notable case ===
Jones was noted for his authorship of the Court's majority opinion overturning the conviction of Steve Jones, a Communist, on state sedition charges.

== Later career and death ==
Jones was briefly senior advisor to the Philadelphia law firm of Morgan, Lewis & Bockius. Jones died on May 21, 1966, in Wynnewood, Montgomery County, Pennsylvania.

== Family ==
Jones was survived by his wife, Isabella Arrott; they were married in 1918. He was also survived by a son and daughter. Another son, Charles Alvin Jones Jr. was killed during World War II while serving as a Marine aviator in the Pacific.

== Sources ==
- Morgan, Alfred L. "The Significance of Pennsylvania's 1938 Gubernatorial Election", Pennsylvania Magazine of History and Biography 102, No. 2, April, 1978. Accessed March 27, 2015
- Pittsburgh Press, May 22, 1966, Section 3, pg.3. "Justice Jones Dies at 78".
- "Historical List of Supreme Court Justices" website of the Unified Judicial System of Pennsylvania. Retrieved March 28, 2015.
- Closed for Business: The Story of Bankers Trust Company During the Great Depression", A Digital History Project of the Historical Society of Pennsylvania. Retrieved March 28, 2015.
- "'Good American Couple' Describes Candidate and Wife", Pittsburgh Press, February 27, 1938, pg. 2.
- Squadron Historical Summary, on the website of Marine Bombing Squadron 611. Retrieved March 28, 2015.
- "Charles Alvin Jones", Gettysburg Compiler, October 22, 1938. Retrieved March 28, 2015.

Legal offices
Preceded by John Warren Davis	Judge of the United States Court of Appeals for the Third Circuit; 1939–1944	Succeeded by Harry Ellis Kalodner
Party political offices
Preceded by George Howard Earle III	Democratic nominee for Governor of Pennsylvania; 1938	Succeeded by F. Clair Ross
