= USS Emerald (SP-177) =

Patrol vessel of the United States Navy

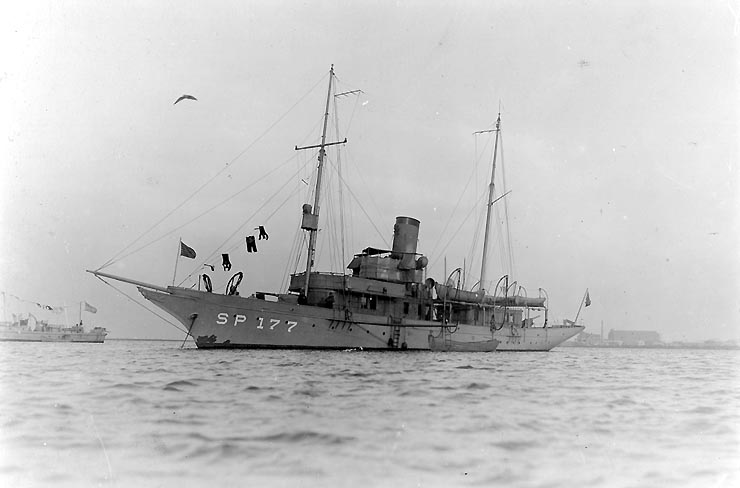
- USS Emerald at anchor with laundry drying on her foremast rigging, ca. 1918.

History

United States
- Name: USS Emerald
- Namesake: The emerald, a green gem stone (previous name retained)
- Builder: Pusey and Jones, Wilmington, DE
- Completed: 1906
- Acquired: 23 July 1917
- Commissioned: Either commissioned 23 July 1917 or served in non-commissioned status
- In service: 23 July 1917
- Out of service: 12 December 1918
- Fate: Returned to owner
- Notes: Operated as civilian steam yacht Emrose and Emerald 1916–1917 and as Emerald from 1918

General characteristics
- Type: steam yacht
- Tonnage: 198 GRT, 134 NRT
- Length: 140.4 ft (42.8 m)
- Beam: 21.0 ft (6.4 m)
- Depth: 31.3 ft (9.5 m)
- Installed power: 900 indicated horsepower (1.2 megawatts)
- Propulsion: Two Almy water-tube boilers, one triple-expansion steam engine, one shaft
- Complement: 13

The second USS Emerald (SP-177) was a steam yacht that served as an armed yacht in the United States Navy as a patrol vessel from 1917 to 1918.

Emerald was built as Emrose in 1906 by Pusey and Jones at Wilmington, Delaware for A. W. Rose of New York City. She later became the property of Maxwell Wyeth of Philadelphia, Pennsylvania, and was renamed Emerald.

The US Navy acquired Emerald from Wyeth on 23 July 1917 for World War I service as a patrol vessel and placed her in service that day as USS Emerald (SP-177). Sources differ on whether she was commissioned or served in non-commissioned status.

For the rest of World War I, Emerald served in the 4th Naval District on harbor entrance patrol duty in Delaware Bay.

Emerald was taken out of service on 12 December 1918 and returned to Wyeth.
