= Charles J. Margiotti =

American politician

Charles Joseph Margiotti
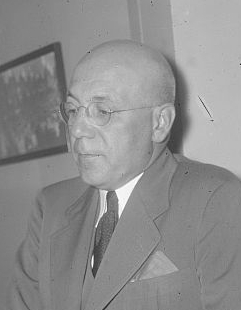
- 1937 photograph

Attorney General of Pennsylvania
- In office July 5, 1950 – March 2, 1951
- Governor: James H. Duff
- Preceded by: T. McKeen Chidsey
- Succeeded by: Robert E. Woodside
- In office January 15, 1935 – April 27, 1938
- Governor: George Howard Earle III
- Preceded by: William A. Schnader
- Succeeded by: Guy K. Bard

Personal details
- Born: April 9, 1891 Punxsutawney, Pennsylvania
- Died: August 25, 1956 (aged 65) Pittsburgh, Pennsylvania
- Education: Indiana Normal School; University of Pennsylvania Law School

Charles Joseph Margiotti (April 9, 1891 – August 25, 1956) was a nationally prominent Pennsylvania lawyer who twice served as state attorney general.

== Background ==
Margiotti was born the son of Joseph and Fortunata Recca Margiotti. His undergraduate education was at the Indiana Normal School (1912), and his law school education was at the University of Pennsylvania (1915).

== Career ==
In 1934, Margiotti ran for the Republican nomination for state governor and lost to Attorney General William A. Schnader. He then switched parties and successfully supported George Earle, who then appointed him as Schnader's successor as attorney general.

In 1935, Margiotti was appointed state attorney general by Earle. Margiotti prosecuted a number of graft cases involving Earle's administration. Margiotti himself was accused of arranging excessive tax collection fees for his own law firm and sued The Philadelphia Inquirer for libel over their coverage.

In 1938, Margiotti ran for the Democratic nomination for state governor. He campaigned on the issue that the Earle administration was corrupt, and Earle dismissed him. Margiotti lost the nomination to Charles Alvin Jones. This time, Margiotti did not switch parties.

In September 1948, Margiotti joined former CIO general counsel Lee Pressman in testing the campaign-expenditures provision of the Taft-Hartley Act. Pressman and Margiotti each received $37,500 for their services – a fee CIO President Philip Murray called "outrageous, even for Standard Oil".

In 1950, Margiotti was appointed again as state attorney general by Republican Governor Jim Duff, a personal friend. The incoming 1951 governor, Republican John Fine, in submitting his Cabinet nominees for approval to the General Assembly, left the attorney general position blank, as he intending to retain Margiotti without giving the General Assembly a chance to reject him. The Democrats responded by blocking all Cabinet appointments in protest against Margiotti, and after a six-week standoff, Margiotti resigned.

== Prominent cases ==
Margiotti was the prosecutor in the murder trial of Irene Schroeder.

Margiotti successfully defended Senator James J. Davis, who had been accused of running a lottery by mail on behalf of the Loyal Order of Moose.

Margiotti successfully defended federal judge Albert Williams Johnson and others who had been accused of conspiracy to sell justice.

Legal offices
Preceded by William A. Schnader	Pennsylvania Attorney General; 1935–1938	Succeeded by Guy K. Bard
Preceded by T. McKeen Chidsey	Pennsylvania Attorney General; 1950–1951	Succeeded by Robert E. Woodside
