= William A. Schnader =

American politician (1886–1968)

- c. 1931

Attorney General of Pennsylvania
- In office November 1, 1930 – January 15, 1935
- Governor: John Stuchell Fisher; Gifford Pinchot
- Preceded by: Cyrus Woods
- Succeeded by: Charles Margiotti

Personal details
- Born: October 5, 1886 Bowmansville, Pennsylvania, US
- Died: March 18, 1968 (aged 81) Chestnut Hill, Philadelphia, Pennsylvania, US
- Resting place: West Laurel Hill Cemetery
- Party: Republican
- Spouse: Ethel Keller Heintsh (m. 1915)

William A. Schnader (October 5, 1886 – March 18, 1968) was an American lawyer and politician. He was Attorney General of Pennsylvania and co-founder of the law firm Schnader, Harrison, Segal & Lewis.

== Early life ==
Schnader was born on October 5, 1886 in Bowmansville, Pennsylvania. HIs father was the Luterhan clergyman Charles B. Schnader.

He graduated with a B.A. from Franklin & Marshall College in 1908. He then taught at the New Jersey Academy at Bridgeport, New Jersey. He earned a law degree from the University of Pennsylvania Law School in 1912.

He graduated from the University of Pennsylvania Law School in 1912, and was appointed a deputy attorney general in 1923 by Gov. Gifford Pinchot. Gov. John S. Fisher, who succeeded Mr. Pinchot in 1927, appointed Mr. Schnader Attorney General. He retained this position when Mr. Pinchot returned to the Governor's office to serve a second term.

== Career ==
Schnader was appointed special deputy attorney general of Pennsylvania in 1923 by Governal Gifford Pinchot in 1923. Governor John S. Fisher appointed Snyder to the position of attorney general in 1927. Returning to office, Pinchot allowed Schnader to keep the position in 1930.

In 1934, Schnader was an unsuccessful Republican candidate for governor. In 1935, Schnader and Bernard G. Segal, the former Deputy Attorney General, joined with Francis A. Lewis, who had been a partner in another law firm and the treasurer of Schnader's gubernatorial campaign, to form the law firm of Schnader & Lewis in Philadelphia. Shortly thereafter, they added Bernard Segal as a named partner. In the early years, the members of the firm gained prominent clients and soon national recognition handling a major case heard by the Supreme Court of the United States. In 1948, Earl G. Harrison, after resigning as Dean of the University of Pennsylvania Law School, joined the firm as the fourth named partner.

Schnader was active in creating the Uniform Commercial Code – in fact, he dedicated nearly twenty years of his life to the organization, drafting, development and promotion of a nationwide system of business law, which earned him the title, "Father of the Uniform Commercial Code." Notably, much of this work was accomplished while in a wheelchair following a crippling stroke. For this "conspicuous service to American jurisprudence," he was awarded the Gold Medal of the American Bar Association in 1960. His public service included many other contributions, including five years' work as Chairman of the American Bar Association Bill of Rights Committee (the forerunner of the present Section of Individual Rights and Responsibilities), and service as President of the Pennsylvania Bar Association in 1962–63.

== Personal life ==
He died on March 18, 1969 at his home in Chestnut Hill, Philadelphia, Pennsylvania. He was buried in West Laurel Hill Cemetery in Bala Cynwyd, Pennsylvania.

Political offices
Preceded by Cyrus Woods	Attorney General of Pennsylvania; 1930–1935	Succeeded by Charles Margiotti
Party political offices
Preceded by Gifford Pinchot	Republican nominee for Governor of Pennsylvania; 1934	Succeeded by Arthur James
