= George Howard Earle III =

American politician and diplomat

George Earle
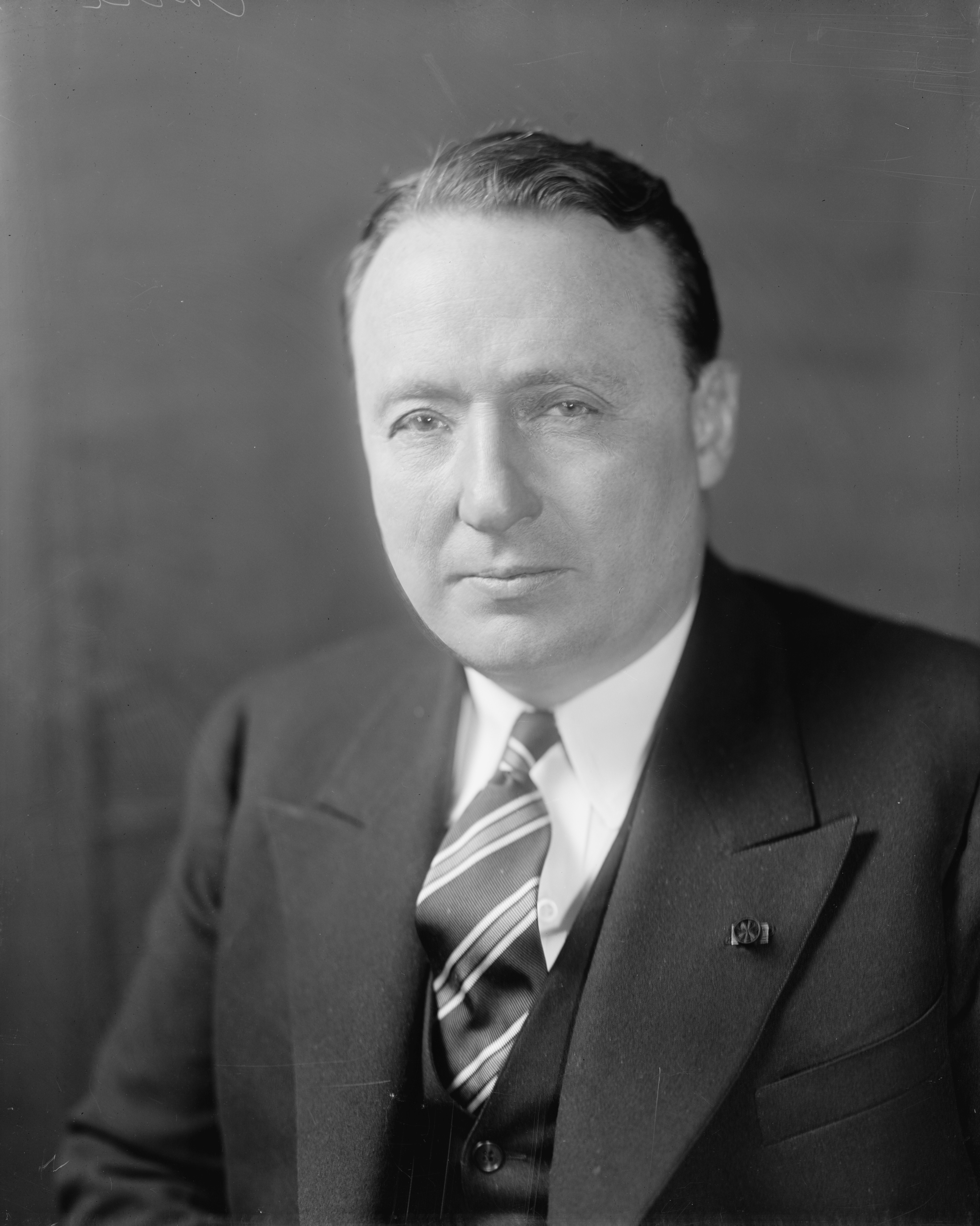
- Portrait by Harris & Ewing c. 1935–1939

United States Minister to Bulgaria
- In office February 14, 1940 – December 13, 1941
- President: Franklin Roosevelt
- Preceded by: Ray Atherton
- Succeeded by: Donald Heath

Member of the Democratic National Committee from Pennsylvania
- In office May 22, 1936 – February 21, 1940
- Preceded by: Sedgwick Kistler
- Succeeded by: David Lawrence

30th Governor of Pennsylvania
- In office January 15, 1935 – January 17, 1939
- Lieutenant: Thomas Kennedy
- Preceded by: Gifford Pinchot
- Succeeded by: Arthur James

26th United States Ambassador to Austria-Hungary
- In office July 24, 1933 – March 25, 1934
- President: Franklin Roosevelt
- Preceded by: Gilchrist Baker Stockton
- Succeeded by: George Messersmith

Personal details
- Born: George Hussey Earle III; December 5, 1890 Devon, Pennsylvania, U.S.
- Died: December 30, 1974 (aged 84) Bryn Mawr, Pennsylvania, U.S.
- Party: Democratic
- Spouse: Jacqueline Sacre (m.1945)
- Children: 6
- Education: Harvard University

George Howard Earle III (December 5, 1890 – December 30, 1974) was an American politician and diplomat from Pennsylvania. He was a member of the prominent Earle and Van Leer families and the 30th governor of Pennsylvania from 1935 to 1939. Earle was one of just two Democrats who served as governor of Pennsylvania between the Civil War and World War II.

The son of prominent attorney George Howard Earle Jr., Earle worked in his family's sugar business after graduating from Harvard University. During World War I, he commanded USS Victor, a submarine chaser which was also his private yacht. Though raised a Republican, Earle joined the Democrats out of dissatisfaction with the Republican Party's handling of the Great Depression. He campaigned for Franklin D. Roosevelt in the 1932 presidential election and served as the U.S. Minister to Austria from 1933 to 1934. In this role, he warned the Roosevelt administration of the rising danger presented by Nazi Germany.

Earle defeated Republican William A. Schnader in the 1934 Pennsylvania gubernatorial election. As governor, he introduced an ambitious "Little New Deal" that sought to combat the effects of the Great Depression. Among other policies, his administration created a centralized Department of Public Assistance, eliminated the private police forces operated by several coal and steel companies, began construction of the Pennsylvania Turnpike, instituted Pennsylvania's first gasoline and cigarette tax, and established a forty-hour work week. The Little New Deal made Earle one of the most popular politicians in the country.

Earle sought election to the United States Senate in 1938, but he was defeated by incumbent Republican Senator James J. Davis. Earle was appointed as the Minister to Bulgaria in 1940 and served as a special emissary to the Balkans during World War II. He compiled a report blaming the Katyn massacre of Polish intelligentsia on the Soviet Union, but this report was suppressed. After the war, he served as assistant governor of American Samoa. He retired from public office and died in 1974.

== Early life ==
Earle was born in Devon, Pennsylvania to George Howard Earle Jr. and Catharine Hansell French, a wealthy family that traced its lineage in America to the arrival of the Mayflower. His grandmother Mrs. Frances ("Fanny") Van Leer was a member of one of the first Pennsylvania families, the Van Leer family and his great-grandfather Samuel Van Leer played an important role in the American Revolutionary War. He received a degree from Harvard University and subsequently worked abroad in a family-owned sugar business. He enlisted in the military in 1916 and was assigned to the Mexican border during the Pancho Villa Expedition. After the United States entered World War I, Earle commanded USS Victor, a submarine chaser which was also his private yacht. He earned the Navy Cross in 1918 after averting a fatal explosion. After the war, Earle returned to private business, particularly in the sugar industry. Though raised as a Republican, Earle joined the Democratic Party over disillusionment with the Republican Party's handling of the Great Depression. After campaigning for Franklin Roosevelt in the 1932 election, Earle served as Ambassador to Austria from July 24, 1933 until March 25, 1934. Earle looked warily upon the Nazi Party, and warned the FDR Administration of the potential danger of Nazi Germany.

== Governorship ==
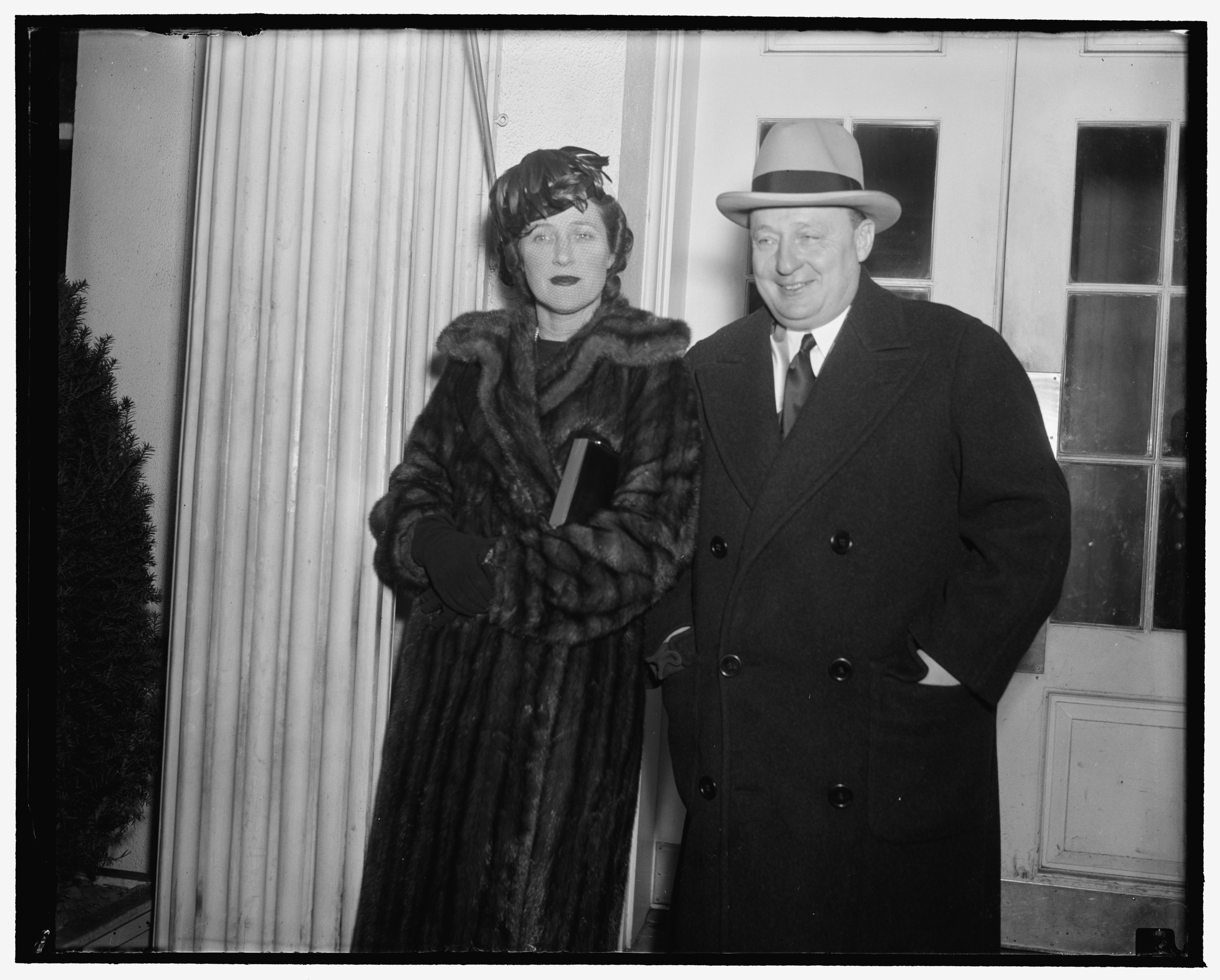
Earle and his wife at the White House after visiting President Roosevelt, 1938

Although Pennsylvania had not elected a Democratic governor in over forty years, Earle defeated Republican Attorney General William A. Schnader in the 1934 Pennsylvania gubernatorial election. Though Earle faced a split legislature in the first half of his term, his party gained control of both chambers of the Pennsylvania legislature in the 1936 election. An ardent Roosevelt admirer, Earle rolled out an ambitious "Little New Deal", which resulted in the introduction of a record 3514 bills during the 1935-36 session of the Pennsylvania General Assembly. His administration created a centralized Department of Public Assistance that was designed to ensure uniform allocation of relief payments. Earle's government also sought to ameliorate ongoing labor strife by increasing union bargaining rights and eliminating the private police forces operated by many of the influential coal and steel companies. Pennsylvania Turnpike construction also began during his tenure. Other bills passed include Pennsylvania's first gasoline and cigarette tax, teacher tenure, and a maximum forty-hour work week. Earle's administration relaxed Pennsylvania's Blue laws, passed the nation's first milk control law, and outlawed company police forces hired by mining companies.

Earle's "Little New Deal" earned him a place on the cover of Time magazine in 1937, and a Gallup poll that same year saw him named the nation's third most popular Democrat (after the president and vice president). However, Earle also became known for his mercurial temperament and his administration was plagued by high-profile corruption charges involving his top officials. Earle's poor relationship with the state's judicial hierarchy resulted in one of his central policy goals, the imposition of a graduated income tax, being declared unconstitutional. Earle, who was constitutionally ineligible to run for a second consecutive term as governor, ran for the Senate in 1938, but lost to incumbent Republican James J. Davis. Earle's loss to Davis coincided with a Republican landslide that saw Republicans re-gain control of the legislature and governorship. Pennsylvania would not elect another Democratic governor until 1954.

== Post-governorship ==
Earle was appointed Minister to Bulgaria on February 14, 1940, and served until December 13, 1941.

During World War II, he served again in the United States Navy, this time as a lieutenant commander and as a special emissary to the Balkans. In 1943 Earl was the special envoy of the President as naval attaché in neutral Istanbul. He proposed a plan that he believed might bring the war in Europe to an early end. The German ambassador in Istanbul Franz von Papen and the head of Abwehr Wilhelm Canaris had secretly proposed a coup against Adolf Hitler that would end with Hitler turned over to the US as a war criminal, but the plot was not approved by the US government.

In 1944, President Roosevelt assigned Earle to compile information on the Katyń massacre, the massacre of the Polish intelligentsia by the Soviet government. Earle did so, using contacts in Bulgaria and Romania, and concluded that the Soviet Union was guilty. After consulting with Elmer Davis, the director of the Office of War Information, Roosevelt rejected Earle's conclusion, saying that he was convinced of the responsibility of Germany, and ordered Earle's report suppressed. At this time, the United States and Soviet Union were still fighting Nazi Germany and Japan. When Earle formally requested permission to publish his findings, the President gave him a written order to desist. Roosevelt, according to Simeon Saxe-Coburg-Gotha, was further angered when Earle made suggestions to avert a Soviet takeover of Bulgaria following the Allied victory. After these clashes, Earle was reassigned and spent the rest of World War II in American Samoa.

After the war, Earle served as assistant governor of American Samoa, and then returned to the private sector. Ambassador Ralph Earle II is his son.

He died on December 30, 1974, and was interred at the Church of the Redeemer cemetery in Bryn Mawr, Pennsylvania.

Diplomatic posts
Preceded by Ray Atherton	United States Minister to Bulgaria; 1940	Succeeded by Donald Heath
Preceded by Gilchrist Baker Stockton	United States Minister to Austria; 1933–1934	Succeeded by George Messersmith
Political offices
Preceded by Gifford Pinchot	Governor of Pennsylvania; 1935–1939	Succeeded by Arthur James
Party political offices
Preceded by John Hemphill	Democratic nominee for Governor of Pennsylvania; 1934	Succeeded by Charles Alvin Jones
Preceded by Lawrence Rupp	Democratic nominee for U.S. Senator from Pennsylvania (Class 3); 1938	Succeeded by Francis Myers
