= Milton Shapp 1976 presidential campaign =

American political campaign

Milton Shapp for President
- Campaign: U.S. presidential election, 1976
- Candidate: Milton Shapp; 40th Governor of Pennsylvania (1971–1979)
- Affiliation: Democratic Party
- Status: Withdrawn (lost primary)
- Key people: Norval Reece (Manager)
- Receipts: US$913,755.57

Governor Milton Shapp of Pennsylvania unsuccessfully sought the Democratic Party nomination for president of the United States in the 1976 election. Shapp won reelection as governor of Pennsylvania in the 1974 election, the first Pennsylvania governor to be elected to a second four-year term following an amendment permitting this in 1967, and had hoped to translate his relative popularity in Pennsylvania into the groundwork of a successful presidential campaign.

Shapp ran on a platform of bifurcating the United States federal budget into short-term and long-term expenditure and a reduction of the federal funds rate to reduce inflation. The campaign attempted a strategy of amassing votes and Democratic National Convention delegates in the Northeastern United States in order to generate momentum and expand into a national campaign while galvanizing more widespread support. This strategy proved unsuccessful, however, and Shapp had poor showings in the early primaries, both within the northeast and elsewhere. Considered a long-shot for the nomination, Shapp withdrew from the race after a poor showing in the Massachusetts and Florida primaries.

== Background ==
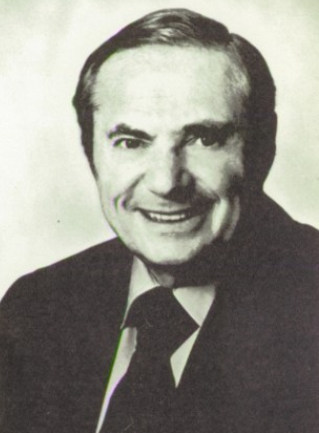
Milton Shapp in 1975 or 1976

Shapp entered politics in 1960 as an active supporter of John F. Kennedy's successful presidential campaign during that year's election. In correspondence with President Kennedy's brother Robert, Shapp played a role in the creation of the Peace Corps and served as an adviser in that organization during the Kennedy administration. Following his service in the Peace Corps, Shapp mounted his first campaign for governor of Pennsylvania in the 1966 election. Shapp ran as the anti-political machine candidate and defeated the machine-endorsed candidate, future governor Bob Casey Sr., in the Democratic primary. However, he went on to lose the general election to Republican Raymond P. Shafer, who was then serving as lieutenant governor under Bill Scranton.

Shapp again sought the governorship in the 1970 election, in which incumbent Governor Shafer was not a candidate for reelection (having been barred from running since he was elected prior to the 1967 amendment permitting successive four-year terms). He again defeated Bob Casey Sr. for the Democratic nomination, but this time was victorious in the general election. He defeated Shafer's lieutenant governor, Republican Raymond J. Broderick, and entered office in January 1971. Having gained a reputation as a populist and a consumer advocate, Shapp won re-election in the 1974 election, defeating Republican Drew Lewis.

== Campaign highlights ==
After expressing a serious interest in and an intention to run in the 1976 election in mid-1975, Shapp announced his candidacy for the presidency of the United States on September 25, 1975, in Washington, D.C. Shapp's campaign focused primarily on reforming the United States federal budget, splitting it into two separate budgets: a perpetually balanced operating budget meant to fund day-to-day government expenditure and an "investment" budget meant to fund long-term initiatives, such as infrastructure improvement and research into energy sources. In particular, for the investment budget, Shapp proposed a six-fold increase in federal education expenditure (to $50 billion in 1976 dollars per year) and improvements to railroads (totaling $13 billion in 1976 dollars). In an interview with the Associated Press in January 1976, Shapp indicated that he did not have an estimate of the total size of the respective budgets, though he did say that he planned to fund the additional expenditures via the national debt, as well as a surcharge on the federal income tax together with other surcharges, which he claimed would help to pay down the additional accrued principal and interest on the debt. Shapp also called for reducing the federal funds rate, which he claimed would slow inflation. Among those who endorsed Shapp for president was U.S. senator and future president Joe Biden of Delaware.

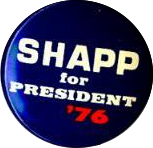
Shapp for President '76 campaign button

Shapp's campaign adopted a strategy of focusing efforts on garnering votes in the Northeastern United States, announcing that Shapp would compete in primary contests in Massachusetts, New Jersey, New York, and Pennsylvania despite skipping the New Hampshire primary. From the beginning of the campaign, however, Shapp had difficulty extending his appeal from the northeastern states. At a Democratic convention in Florida in November 1975, he finished second out of ten candidates in a straw poll behind former Georgia governor Jimmy Carter, the only other candidate to make an appearance at the convention and who would go on to win the nomination and general election. Shapp entered the campaign relatively late and, as a result, had less time to organize in the early primary states. Although he did not expect to win the Florida primary, he stated that he would be satisfied with a showing of 10 to 15 percent in order to prove he had extended his appeal from the northeast and had become a candidate with a national base of support.

Despite Shapp's attempts to expand his support beyond Pennsylvania and the northeast, he did not have success in the primaries. He finished with three percent of the vote in the Massachusetts primary on March 2, earning one delegate to the 1976 Democratic National Convention. After the poor showing in Massachusetts, Shapp and his campaign staff lowered expectations for the Florida primary, though expressing confidence in his ability to garner at least seven percent of the vote there (in contrast to the 10 to 15 percent goal Shapp had set earlier). The results of the March 9 Florida primary also failed to meet the campaign's expectations; just over two percent of voters cast their ballots for Shapp, who did not earn any delegates from the state and finished with slightly fewer votes than the "uncommitted" option on the ballot.

Following the results in Massachusetts and Florida, Shapp began to reconsider his campaign for the presidency. In the days following the Florida primary, Shapp discussed the future of the campaign with members of his campaign staff and family, as well as his supporters, after which he decided to end his campaign for the Democratic nomination on March 11. On the following day, March 12, Shapp formally announced his withdrawal from the presidential race. He did not endorse any of his former competitors in his announcement and stated that he would return to Harrisburg, Pennsylvania, to serve the remainder of his term as governor and to concentrate his efforts on the passage of the state budget. In his withdrawal, Shapp stated that he did not have the time or money necessary to continue with the campaign. He was the fourth candidate to withdraw from the Democratic primary race.

== Aftermath ==
After his withdrawal, Shapp became a speculated candidate for a Cabinet post or another appointment in a potential administration of one of his former competitors. Although Shapp stated that he was not seeking an appointment, he did not specify whether he would accept or decline one if offered, and fellow Democratic presidential candidate Mo Udall expressed an openness to considering Shapp for a Cabinet appointment should he be elected president. Instead, Jimmy Carter eventually won the Democratic nomination and went on to defeat incumbent Republican President Gerald Ford in the November general election. Shapp did not receive an appointment in the Carter administration.

In May 1977, the Federal Election Commission (FEC) determined that Shapp was not eligible for federal public financing of his presidential campaign and he was subsequently ordered to repay the US$299,066 (equivalent to $1,652,558 in 2024) he had received in federal funds. The FEC ruled that the Shapp campaign had improperly reported contributions from five states of the twenty-state minimum requirement for federal funding.

Following the 1976 campaign, Shapp returned to Pennsylvania to serve the remainder of his second term as governor. Although unsuccessful in running for president, Shapp is credited with creating the Pennsylvania Department of Aging, overseeing the passage of legislation requiring financial disclosure by Pennsylvania government officials, and implementing reforms to the Pennsylvania Turnpike. Shapp served as governor until retiring from politics upon the inauguration of his successor, Republican Dick Thornburgh, in 1979.

== See also ==
- 1976 Democratic Party presidential primaries
- 1976 United States presidential election
