= Keneth =

Keneth may refer to:

- Saint Cenydd, a Welsh Saint of the Christian Church
- Trainee Keneth, a character from the game Suikoden IV
- Keneth Alden Simons (1913–2004), American electrical engineer

== See also ==
- Kenneth
