= Raymond P. Shafer =

American politician (1917–2006)

- Shafer in May 1967

39th Governor of Pennsylvania
- In office January 17, 1967 – January 19, 1971
- Lieutenant: Raymond Broderick
- Preceded by: William Scranton
- Succeeded by: Milton Shapp

23rd Lieutenant Governor of Pennsylvania
- In office January 15, 1963 – January 17, 1967
- Governor: Bill Scranton
- Preceded by: John Morgan Davis
- Succeeded by: Raymond Broderick

Member of the Pennsylvania Senate from the 50th district
- In office January 6, 1959 – November 30, 1962
- Preceded by: Rowland Mahany
- Succeeded by: Rowland Mahany
- Constituency: Parts of Crawford County and Mercer County

Personal details
- Born: Raymond Philip Shafer; March 5, 1917 New Castle, Pennsylvania, U.S.
- Died: December 12, 2006 (aged 89) Meadville, Pennsylvania, U.S.
- Party: Republican
- Spouse: Jane Harris Davies (m. 1941)
- Children: 3
- Education: Allegheny College (AB); Yale Law School (LLB)
- Occupation: Politician; lawyer

Military service
- Allegiance: United States
- Branch/service: United States Navy
- Years of service: 1942–1945
- Rank: Lieutenant
- Battles/wars: World War II
- Awards: Bronze Star Medal; Purple Heart Medal

Raymond Philip Shafer (March 5, 1917 – December 12, 2006) was an American attorney and politician who served as the 39th governor of Pennsylvania from 1967 to 1971. Prior to that, he served as the 23rd lieutenant governor of Pennsylvania from 1963 to 1967 and as a Pennsylvania state senator from 1959 to 1962. He was a national leader of the moderate wing of the Republican Party in the late 1960s.

Shafer was born in New Castle, Pennsylvania, and spent his childhood in Meadville. He graduated from Allegheny College in 1938 and Yale Law School in 1941. Following brief stints practicing law in New York City and Meadville and United States Navy service as an intelligence officer and on PT boats during World War II, Shafer entered politics as a district attorney in 1948 and then as a state senator. He was elected lieutenant governor in 1962, under Governor Bill Scranton. Shafer was active in that role and succeeded the term-limited Scranton as governor in the 1966 election. Shafer became a prominent voice among moderate Republicans and oversaw constitutional reforms in Pennsylvania, the formation of the Pennsylvania Department of Transportation, expenditures for health and education programs, and proposed a state income tax, which proved unpopular but was later enacted by his successor, Milton Shapp.

Limited to one four-year term as governor under the prior state constitutional rule, Shafer was not a candidate in the 1970 gubernatorial election. He left office in 1971 with his popularity waning in the midst of fiscal strain and negative reaction to his tax proposal, though some of his administration's major initiatives have had lasting significance. In his later career, he chaired what became known as the Shafer Commission at the request of President Richard Nixon, which recommended the decriminalization of personal marijuana possession and use within the home. He also resumed law practice in Meadville and served in other business and consulting roles in the private and public sectors. He died in Meadville in 2006.

== Early life and career ==
Raymond Philip Shafer was born on March 5, 1917, in New Castle, Pennsylvania, the youngest of the five children of the Rev. David Philip Shafer and his wife Mina Belle (née Miller). In 1933, Shafer's father moved the family to Meadville, Pennsylvania, to accept a position as pastor of the First Christian Church. Shafer became an Eagle Scout and as an adult was presented the Distinguished Eagle Scout Award by the Boy Scouts of America. He graduated from high school in Meadville in 1934 as valedictorian of his class.

After finishing high school, Shafer attended Allegheny College from 1934 to 1938, where he was a member of the Phi Kappa Psi fraternity and served as class president. He graduated as a member of Phi Beta Kappa with a Bachelor of Arts degree in history and political science and was a candidate for a Rhodes Scholarship. At Allegheny, Shafer was an accomplished athlete, achieving all-Pennsylvania honors in basketball and all-American honors in soccer. In 1938, Shafer enrolled at Yale Law School and earned a Bachelor of Laws degree in 1941. While at Yale, Shafer participated in intramural sports, barrister's union, and moot court. Several Yale classmates, such as Bill Scranton and Gerald Ford, would help shape his future political career. The summer after graduating from law school, in June, Shafer sat for the New York State bar exam and, on July 5, he married Jane Harris Davies, whom he had met at Allegheny. The couple went on to have three children together: Diane (born 1942), Raymond Philip Jr. (born c. 1945), and Jane (born 1953, died 1999). Shortly after their marriage, the Shafers settled in New York City and Ray joined the law firm of Winthrop, Stimson, Putnam & Roberts.

In 1942, Shafer entered the United States Navy as a naval intelligence officer and later served on PT boats. He participated in over 80 combat missions during World War II on PT boats as commanding officer of PT-359 and later as executive officer of Squadron 27. As Squadron executive officer, Shafer sailed aboard PT-375, one of the first PT boats to penetrate the defenses of Manila Bay, Philippines, during the Battle of Manila. Shafer earned the Bronze Star and the Purple Heart, as well as the rank of lieutenant during his tour in the Pacific theater.

The Shafers returned to Meadville after the war, where Ray entered private law practice. His political career began in 1948 when he was elected district attorney of Crawford County, a position Shafer held until 1956, serving two terms. In 1958, Shafer ran for a seat in the State Senate to represent the 50th District, consisting of portions of Crawford and Mercer counties. He defeated five-term state representative Edward M. Young in the Republican primary in May, 55% to 45%, aided significantly by a better than 8-to-1 showing in Crawford County. Shafer prevailed over the Democratic nominee, Harold B. Turner, in the November general election by a similar margin, 54% to 46%. While a state senator, Shafer began to accumulate a liberal-leaning voting record in support of such initiatives as anti-housing discrimination.

=== Lieutenant governor of Pennsylvania (1963–1967) ===
In March 1962, Republican gubernatorial candidate Bill Scranton tapped Shafer as his running mate in that year's gubernatorial election. Scranton had been Shafer's classmate at Yale Law School, and both were part of the moderate wing of the Republican Party. Shafer accepted Scranton's offer and became the Republican nominee for lieutenant governor of Pennsylvania. The Scranton–Shafer ticket won the election by a margin of nearly a half million votes over the Democratic ticket led by Philadelphia mayor Richardson Dilworth and State Representative Stephen McCann, the House majority leader. Scranton and Shafer were inaugurated as governor and lieutenant governor, respectively, in January 1963.

As lieutenant governor, Shafer took a more active role in state government than his predecessors had and chaired Pennsylvania's delegation to the 1964 Republican National Convention. During Scranton's unsuccessful campaign for president of the United States that year, Shafer assumed some of the day-to-day responsibilities of the governorship in Scranton's stead. The press took notice of Shafer's activity as lieutenant governor, with The Republic in Meyersdale, Pennsylvania, reporting in November 1964 that Shafer's speaking schedule was nearly as rigorous as Scranton's and that Shafer had begun to assume responsibility for steering some of the Scranton administration's initiatives, speculating that Shafer himself might be a candidate for governor to succeed the term-limited Scranton in 1966. Initiatives that Shafer led at Scranton's request included the selection of a superintendent of public instruction, leadership of a private sector outreach tour regarding Scranton's unemployment compensation proposal, and chairmanship of the administration's legislative policy committee.

== Governor of Pennsylvania ==
=== 1966 campaign ===
Bill Scranton was limited to one term under then-existing state law and the media considered Shafer a potential successor as the Republican nominee. U.S. Representative Richard Schweiker had also indicated interest in seeking the nomination. On January 10, 1966, Shafer formally announced his candidacy for governor. The same day, Pennsylvania Attorney General Walter Alessandroni, Shafer's running mate, announced his own candidacy for lieutenant governor. Both Shafer and Alessandroni were endorsed by Scranton, U.S. Senator Hugh Scott, and Schweiker, who had withdrawn from contention. The 1966 election was marked by tragedies. Alessandroni was killed in an aviation accident during the campaign and won the nomination for lieutenant governor posthumously; Ray Broderick was named to replace him on the ticket. Former governor David L. Lawrence collapsed and fell into a coma during a campaign appearance for the Democratic nominee, wealthy Philadelphia businessman Milton Shapp, and died later that November.

In the general election campaign, including in a television debate between Shafer and Shapp in October, Shafer attacked Shapp's record as a businessman and Shapp charged that Shafer had obstructed important legislation, such as highway funding, as a state senator. Shafer and Shapp also disagreed sharply over price controls for milk; Shafer indicated that he would reform milk price controls to ensure fair market prices were placed, but Shapp insisted that Shafer's arrangement would effectively continue the status quo of price controls and argued that abolition of the controls and a free market approach was superior. Heading into the weekend immediately prior to the election, The Times-Tribune in Scranton (whose editorial board had endorsed Shapp) reported that most polling showed the race between Shafer and Shapp to be relatively even and opined that Shapp had run a more effective and spirited campaign, though The Philadelphia Inquirer reported less than a week before the election that Republican-commissioned polls showed Shafer ahead of Shapp by an average of 9.2% with Shapp falling further behind. On election day, Shafer and Broderick ultimately defeated Shapp and his running mate, Leonard Staisey, by a margin of nearly a quarter of a million votes, 52.1% to 46.1%, with the remainder of the votes scattered across minor candidates.

=== Tenure (1967–1971) ===
Shafer was inaugurated in January 1967 and became the first governor to reside in the modern Governor's Mansion in Harrisburg. As governor, Shafer pushed for reforms to the state constitution. Lieutenant Governor Shafer chaired a bipartisan committee to explore constitutional reforms in 1963 and later included reforms in his campaign platform in 1966, ultimately announcing support for holding a constitutional convention. By the end of Shafer's first year as governor, in December 1967, a constitutional convention was meeting to consider revisions to state government. Shafer had initially hoped for the election of convention delegates by the Pennsylvania electorate to coincide with a referendum on holding the convention on the primary ballot in May 1967, thus enabling the convention to meet that summer and submit their recommendations to the electorate in November. However, a skeptical General Assembly delayed passage of the convention enabling bill such that delegates were not elected until November 1967, to be seated the following month. Reforms approved by the electorate following this convention, at the primary election in April 1968, included revisions to home rule, audit of state finances, and a new unified judiciary under the Supreme Court of Pennsylvania.

Shafer emerged as a national figure in the moderate wing of the Republican Party during the 1968 presidential election, giving the nominating speech for New York governor Nelson Rockefeller at the 1968 Republican National Convention, although the delegates instead chose former Vice President Richard Nixon as the party's presidential candidate. Shafer himself had received votes in Pennsylvania's presidential primary and initially received support from a majority of Pennsylvania's 64-member convention delegation as a favorite son candidate; he used this leverage in a partially successful attempt to move the Pennsylvania delegation into Rockefeller's column. After Shafer's death, his surviving children told The New York Times that Nixon had offered Shafer the vice presidential spot to balance the ticket with an Eastern moderate, though there is no surviving record to that effect. Nixon ultimately chose Maryland governor Spiro Agnew as his running mate.

Shafer oversaw an expansion of Pennsylvania's highway system, dedicated several portions of the Interstate Highway System in the state, and authorized a merger of four agencies to form the Pennsylvania Department of Transportation (PennDOT). Large expenditures for education and health programs Shafer authorized caused budget deficits by the 1969–70 fiscal year. In an effort to balance the budget, Shafer sought Pennsylvania's first state income tax, a move which made him unpopular with many voters, though he later settled for an increase in the state sales tax. Ultimately, Shafer's successor as governor, Milton Shapp, signed into law a state income tax with bipartisan support. During Shafer's administration, state funding for public education increased by 33%, with public school teachers' salaries increasing by a similar proportion, and post-secondary educational institutions received approximately $114 million in additional funding from the state. Reflecting near the end of his administration, Shafer said he believed that his having prioritized constitutional reforms and public expenditure ahead of tax reform may have precipitated some of the fiscal strain the state faced by 1971, which included deficits as a result of such expenditure. Shafer also oversaw the state government's response to the 1969 York Race Riot in which he declared a state of emergency and sent 200 National Guard troops into the city. In 1969, Shafer ascended to the vice-chairmanship of the Republican Governors Association and succeeded California governor Ronald Reagan as chair in 1970. In 1968 and 1969, Shafer was a member of the Executive Committee of the National Governors Association.

Although the new 1968 constitution allowed incumbent governors to run for reelection, Shafer was bound by the previous rules and was limited to one term. He campaigned for Ray Broderick, his lieutenant governor, as his successor. Although Broderick publicly opposed a state income tax and attempted to distance himself from Shafer's record of large public expenditure, he was ultimately defeated. The 1970 election in Pennsylvania was a Democratic sweep, with Milton Shapp, whom Shafer and Broderick had defeated in 1966, victorious in the gubernatorial election and Democrats gaining control of both houses of the General Assembly for the first time in over 30 years. Shafer's popularity waned towards the end of his administration in the midst of the state's fiscal struggles and members of Republican Party leadership having turned against him. Many of Shafer's critics held that he was unable to effectively galvanize public support for his initiatives or to manage political relationships, earning from some of these critics the derisive nickname "Dudley Do-Right" after a cartoon character known for acting haplessly with good intentions. However, some of these critics conceded the long-term significance of the Shafer administration's accomplishments, particularly with respect to the constitutional reforms and education and other social services. Shafer left office following the expiration of his term and inauguration of governor-elect Shapp in January 1971.

== Post-gubernatorial career ==
=== Shafer Commission ===
After leaving state government, Shafer had initially hoped to be appointed to a federal judgeship on the United States Court of Appeals for the Third Circuit, though he ultimately did not receive an appointment and withdrew his candidacy for the bench in 1972. In the meantime, President Nixon appointed Shafer as chairman of the National Commission on Marijuana and Drug Abuse, also known as the Shafer Commission. However, Nixon paid little attention to Shafer or the Commission while it proceeded with its work, with one Washington, D.C., newspaper columnist reporting that Nixon treated Shafer "like a dog". The Shafer Commission's work nonetheless continued, though Shafer was also criticized in this role by many conservatives after the panel recommended the decriminalization of marijuana use within the home. The commission's March 1972 report had also posited that marijuana use is not without drawbacks and argued that it should nonetheless be discouraged and that selling, growing with the intent to sell, and publicly using marijuana should remain prohibited; however, the commission's recommendation on decriminalization was ultimately not followed by the Nixon administration. Some, such as Eric Sterling of HuffPost, argue that the Shafer Commission's proposal was "ahead of its time".

=== Later life and legacy ===
In February 1972, Shafer became chief executive officer and chairman of the board of the financially troubled TelePrompTer Corporation, which was then the largest cable television company in the United States. He served in this position until being replaced by Jack Kent Cooke, the company's plurality shareholder, in October 1973. He then became chairman emeritus and vice chairman of TelePrompTer. Following the Watergate scandal, Shafer returned to public service upon being named special counsel to new Vice President Nelson Rockefeller, a position he held from 1974 to 1977. From 1977 to 1988 he was a partner and senior counselor with the accounting firm of Coopers & Lybrand and also maintained a law practice in Meadville. He served briefly as acting president of his alma mater, Allegheny College, from 1985 to 1986. Shafer also served on Allegheny's board of trustees, including as chairman from 1972 to 1981, and on the Council on Foreign Relations. Shafer died at the age of 89 in Meadville, Pennsylvania, on December 12, 2006. He was buried with military honors at St. John's Cemetery in Union Township, Crawford County, Pennsylvania.

Shafer was awarded an honorary Doctor of Laws degree from Drexel University in 1968. A section of Interstate 79 in Pennsylvania is named "The Raymond P. Shafer Highway" after him, as is a residence hall at both Edinboro University of Pennsylvania and Indiana University of Pennsylvania and the auditorium at Allegheny College. Pennsylvania House Bill 1652 of 2011, introduced by Democratic State Representative Mark B. Cohen, and Pennsylvania Senate Bill 1003 of 2011, introduced by Democratic State Senator Daylin Leach, were both named "The Governor Raymond P. Shafer Compassionate Use Medical Marijuana Act".

== See also ==
- Interstate 79 – the Raymond P. Shafer Memorial Highway in Pennsylvania

== Bibliography ==
- Newton, David E. (2017). Marijuana: A Reference Handbook (2nd ed.). Santa Barbara, California: ABC-Clio. ISBN 9781440850523.
- Richey, Iris, ed. (1959). The Pennsylvania Manual. Vol. 94. Harrisburg, Pennsylvania: Bureau of Publications, Department of Property and Supplies, Commonwealth of Pennsylvania.

Political offices
Preceded by Bill Scranton	Governor of Pennsylvania; 1967–1971	Succeeded by Milton Shapp
Preceded by John Morgan Davis	Lieutenant Governor of Pennsylvania; 1963–1967	Succeeded by Raymond Broderick
Pennsylvania State Senate
Preceded by Rowland Mahany	Member of the Pennsylvania Senate for the 50th District; 1959–1962	Succeeded by Rowland Mahany
Party political offices
Preceded by John Walker	Republican nominee for Lieutenant Governor of Pennsylvania; 1962	Succeeded by Raymond Broderick
Preceded by Bill Scranton	Republican nominee for Governor of Pennsylvania; 1966	Succeeded by Raymond Broderick
