= 1970 Pennsylvania gubernatorial election =

- November 3, 1970
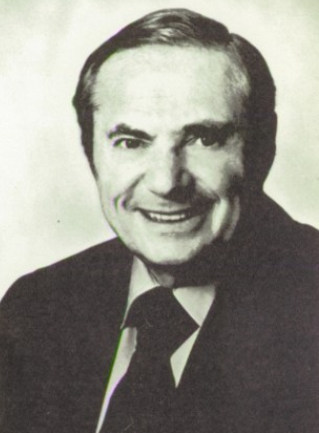

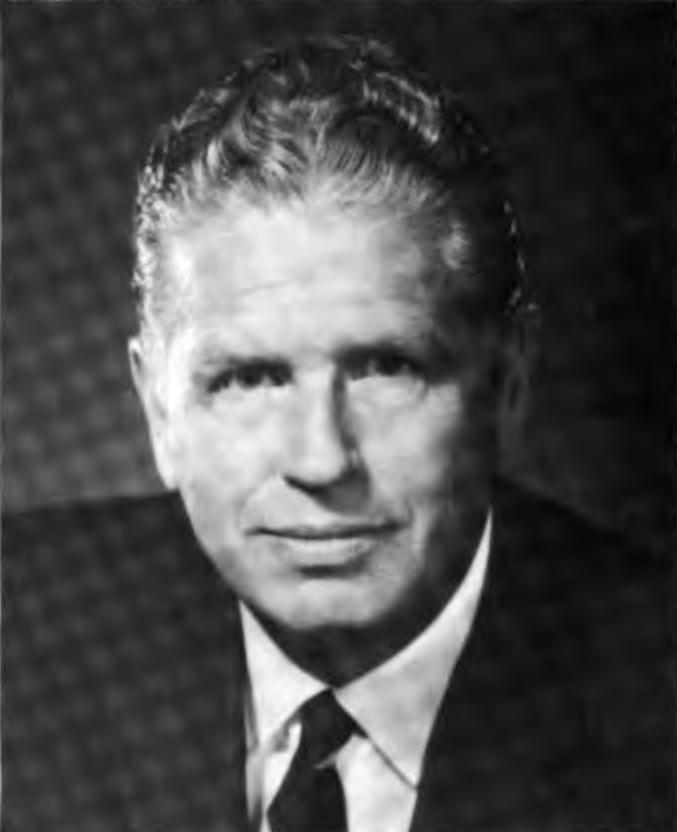
Nominee	Milton Shapp	Ray Broderick
Party	Democratic	Republican
Running mate	Ernie Kline	Ralph Scalera
Popular vote	2,043,029	1,542,854
Percentage	55.30%	41.76%
- County results Shapp: 40–50% 50–60% 60–70% Broderick: 40–50% 50–60% 60–70%
Governor before election
Raymond Shafer
Republican
Elected Governor
Milton Shapp
Democratic

The 1970 Pennsylvania gubernatorial election was held on November 3. Democrat Milton Shapp challenged incumbent Republican Lieutenant Governor Ray Broderick.

== Republican primary ==
Lieutenant Governor Ray Broderick was unopposed for the Republican nomination.

== Democratic primary ==
=== Candidates ===
- Bob Casey Sr., Pennsylvania Auditor General and former State Senator from Scranton
- Harvey F. Johnston, McKees Rocks real estate broker and president of the National Association for the Advancement of White People
- Edward P. Lavalle, Scranton teacher
- Samuel G. Neff, former State Senator from Beaver Falls
- Milton Shapp, Merion businessman and candidate for governor in 1966
- Walter J. Tray, Allentown, Pennsylvania tire dealer

==== Campaign ====
The Democratic campaign was a bruising rematch between 1966 nominee Milton Shapp and Auditor General Bob Casey. As in the prior election, Shapp and Casey proved to be disparate personalities. The liberal and business-oriented Shapp ran an aggressive campaign into which he injected much of his own funding, while the affable Casey ran a relatively conservative campaign and appealed to labor and rural voters.

==== Results ====
Democratic primary results Shapp: 40%–50%; 50%–60%; 60%–70%; Casey: 50%–60%; 60%–70%; 70%–80%; 80%–90%

Pennsylvania gubernatorial Democratic primary election, 1970
Party	Candidate	Votes	%
Democratic	Milton Shapp	519,161	49.15
Democratic	Bob Casey	480,944	45.53
Democratic	Harvey Johnston	33,427	3.17
Democratic	Sam Neff	8,957	0.85
Democratic	Walter Tray	8,252	0.78
Democratic	Ed Lavalle	5,557	0.53
Total votes		1,056,298	100.00

== General election ==
=== Candidates ===
- Ray Broderick, Lieutenant Governor (Republican)
  - Running mate: Ralph Scalera, Beaver County Court of Common Pleas Judge
- Francis McGeever (American Independent)
  - Running mate: Conrad Moore
- Milton Shapp, CEO of Jerrold Electronics and candidate for governor in 1966 (Democratic)
  - Running mate: Ernie Kline, Pennsylvania State Senate Minority Leader
- George Taylor (Socialist Workers)
  - Running mate: Paul Barnes
- A.J. Watson (Constitutional)
  - Running mate: Joe Brewer

=== Campaign ===
Although Pennsylvania's Democratic establishment had not been keen on Shapp during his first run for the executive office, the support of Lieutenant Gubernatorial nominee Ernie Kline, a power broker within the party, caused support to much better coalesce behind Shapp than it had in 1966. Shapp, who was Jewish, also dealt with a lower degree of anti-Semitism during this campaign, as moderate voters were put off by the hateful messages that had been transmitted during the prior election cycle. Broderick's campaign faced an uphill battle, as he was forced to deal with the unpopularity of his boss, Governor Ray Shafer. Furthermore, Broderick was portrayed as unrealistic in his promises, as he asserted that he would not raise taxes, despite a massive state deficit. Broderick attempted to present himself as an ally of Richard Nixon and ran on a corresponding law-and-order platform; however, his tough stances often backfired, such as when outrage ensued over a Republican cartoon that depicted Shapp's liberal view as equivalent to the Viet Cong.

=== Results ===
Shapp won victory by a huge margin. His liberalism and local base allowed him to nearly win the suburbs of Philadelphia, a GOP stronghold at the time. Furthermore, he not only performed well in conservative Central Pennsylvania, but even defeated Broderick by a considerable margin in those locales.

Pennsylvania gubernatorial election, 1970
Party	Candidate	Running mate	Votes	Percentage
Democratic	Milton Shapp	Ernie Kline	2,043,029	55.30%
Republican	Ray Broderick	Ralph Scalera	1,542,854	41.76%
Constitutional	A.J. Watson	Joe Brewer	83,406	2.26%
American Independent	Francis McGeever	Conrad Moore	21,647	0.59%
Socialist Workers	George Taylor	Paul Barnes	3,588	0.10%
Total votes			3,694,524	100.00%
