= Senator Good =

Senator Good or Goode may refer to:

- John G. Good (1926–2003), Pennsylvania State Senate
- Vinal G. Good (1906–2000), Maine State Senate
- Greg Goode (fl. 2020s), Indiana State Senate
- P. Wayne Goode (1937–2020), Missouri State Senate
- Virgil Goode (born 1946), Virginia State Senate
