= 1966 Pennsylvania gubernatorial election =

- November 8, 1966

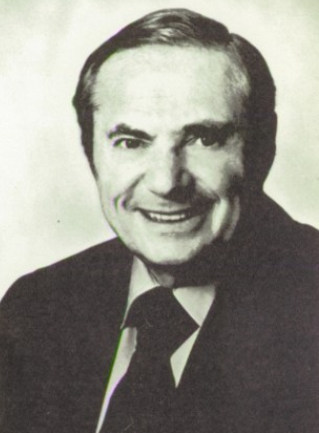
Nominee	Ray Shafer	Milton Shapp
Party	Republican	Democratic
Running mate	Ray Broderick	Leonard Staisey
Popular vote	2,110,349	1,868,719
Percentage	52.10%	46.13%
- County results Shafer: 50–60% 60–70% 70–80% Shapp: 40–50% 50–60%
Governor before election
Bill Scranton
Republican
Elected Governor
Ray Shafer
Republican

The 1966 Pennsylvania gubernatorial election was held on November 8. Republican Ray Shafer, the state's incumbent Lieutenant Governor, was elected to the state's highest office after holding off a charge from future governor Milton Shapp.

== Republican primary ==
=== Candidates ===
- Ray Shafer, incumbent Lieutenant Governor
- Harold Stassen, former president of the University of Pennsylvania, Governor of Minnesota, and perennial candidate

Lieutenant Governor Ray Shafer was endorsed by the party establishment and cruised to a primary win. His main opponent was the well known Harold Stassen, the liberal and somewhat eccentric former governor of Minnesota who had retired from the presidency of the University of Pennsylvania.

=== Results ===
Pennsylvania gubernatorial Republican primary election, 1966
Party	Candidate	Votes	%
Republican	Ray Shafer	835,768	78.02
Republican	Harold Stassen	172,150	16.07
Republican	George Brett	63,366	5.92
Total votes		1,071,284	100.00

== Democratic primary ==
=== Candidates ===
- Bob Casey, State Senator from Scranton
- Edwin Murray
- Milton Shapp, CEO of Jerrold Electronics

Milton Shapp, a wealthy and progressive electronics executive, used his own money to score an upset in the Democratic primary over the party establishment's choice, Bob Casey. Casey, who would later win the governorship in 1986, was a more conservative politician who relied on labor and rural support over the urban and suburban base that Shapp courted.

=== Results ===
Pennsylvania gubernatorial Democratic primary election, 1966
Party	Candidate	Votes	%
Democratic	Milton Shapp	543,057	48.59
Democratic	Bob Casey	493,866	44.19
Democratic	Edwin Murray	80,803	7.23
Total votes		1,117,726	100.00

== General election ==
=== Candidates ===
- Ray Shafer, Lieutenant Governor
  - Running mate: Ray Broderick, attorney (Note: Walter Alessandroni was killed in a plane crash when it was too late to change the ballot for the primary and was posthumously chosen for the Republican Lt. Gov. nomination. The party then selected Broderick.)
- Milton Shapp, CEO of Jerrold Electronics
  - Running mate: Leonard Staisey, State Senator from Duquesne
- Ed Swartz (Constitutional)
  - Running mate: Rick Swaney
- George Taylor (Socialist Workers)
  - Running mate: Herman Johansen

=== Campaign ===
Shapp ran a spirited campaign, in which he tagged himself as a "man against the machine", but the ambivalence of party leaders toward his renegade candidacy may have ultimately led to his defeat; his campaign was also hurt by fierce opposition from the Philadelphia media, over Shapp's personal involvement in attempting to stop the buyout of the Pennsylvania Railroad.

In contrast to Shapp's exuberant campaign, Shafer had difficulty getting his campaign stabilized, particularly after the original nominee for lieutenant governor, Attorney General Walter Alessandroni, was killed in an aviation accident. Shafer ran on a solid record as a liberal Republican, but struggled to escape the reputation that his career was dependent upon Governor Bill Scranton; although he was able to collect the resources that would allow him to compete financially with Shapp due to a solid fundraising prowess, he was forced to spend much of the early portion of the campaign defending his independence. However, the party split within Democratic ranks proved too much for Shapp to overcome, and Shafer won a moderate victory.

The campaign was smeared by charges of discrimination by both candidates. The Jewish Shapp faced anti-Semitic commentary at many of his rallies and accused GOP committees in several counties of attempts to frighten voters by emphasizing hateful, outdated myths about Shapp's religion. In contrast, Shafer asserted that Democrats were attempted to portray him as a racist; in the closing weeks of the campaign, pamphlets were distributed in minority neighborhoods, which alleged that Shafer's home included a restrictive covenant that would stop the sale of his property to any non-Caucasians.

=== Results ===
Pennsylvania gubernatorial election, 1966
Party	Candidate	Running mate	Votes	Percentage
Republican	Ray Shafer	Ray Broderick	2,110,349	52.10%
Democratic	Milton Shapp	Leonard Staisey	1,868,719	46.13%
Constitutional	Ed Swartz	Rick Swaney	57,073	1.41%
Socialist Workers	George Taylor	Herman Johansen	14,527	0.36%
Total votes			4,050,668	100.00%
