= Har Jehuda Cemetery =

Jewish cemetery in Upper Darby Township, Pennsylvania

- בית קברות הר יהודה
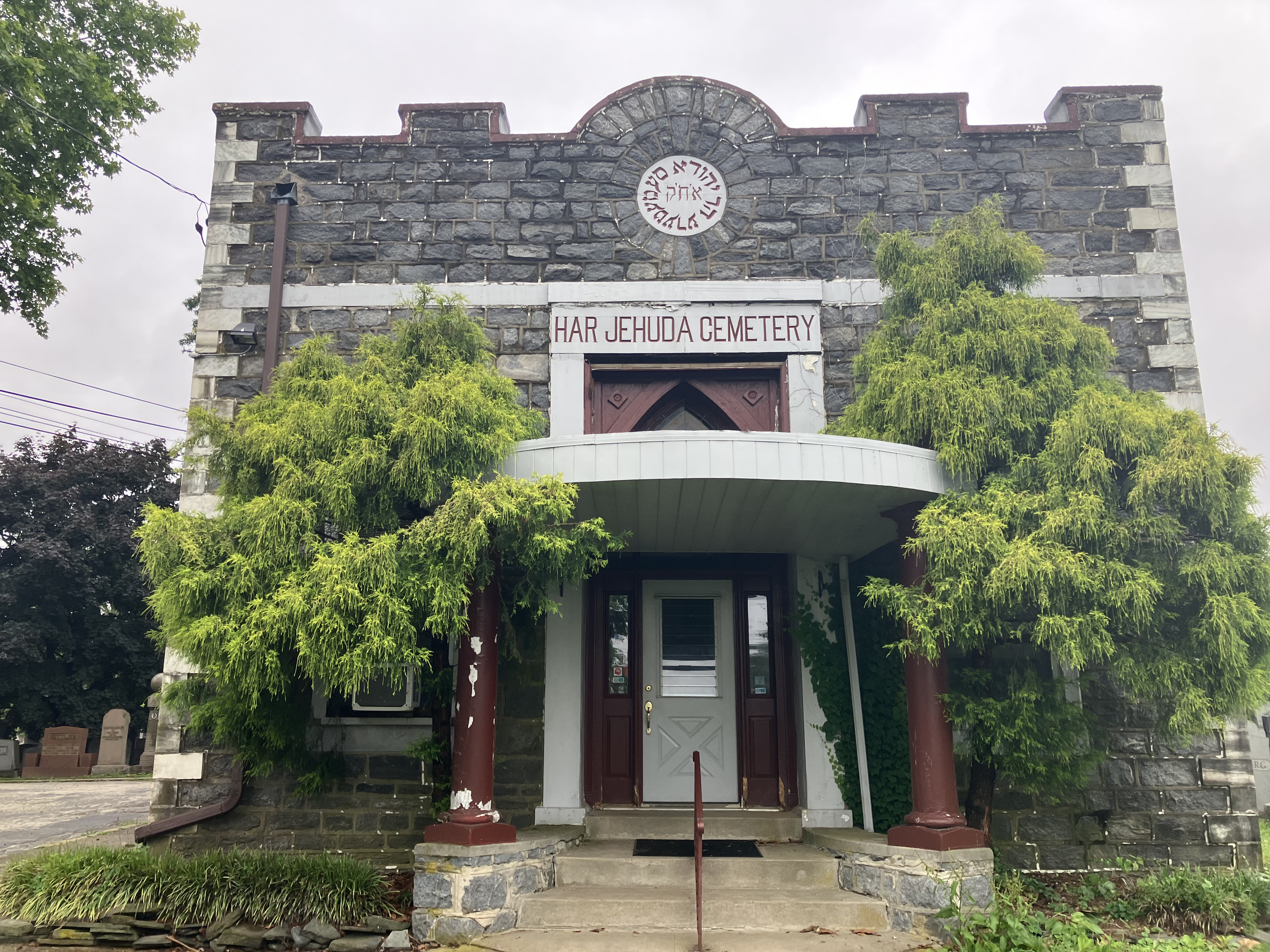
- Office building for Har Jehuda

- Location within Pennsylvania

Details
- Abandoned: No
- Location: Upper Darby, Pennsylvania
- Country: United States
- Coordinates: 39.96390°N 75.29330°W
- Type: Jewish
- Owned by: Larry Maskowitz (1981-present)
- Size: 27 acres (11 ha)
- No. of graves: 20,000+
- Website: www.harjehuda.com
- Find a Grave: Har Jehuda Cemetery

Har Jehuda Cemetery (Hebrew: בית קברות הר יהודה), or Har Judo for short, is a Jewish cemetery located in Upper Darby, Pennsylvania. It is currently home to more than 20,000 burials. It is located along Naylor's Run Creek along the border between Upper Darby and Haverford Townships. It was the first Jewish cemetery in the Philadelphia area to be located West of the city boundaries. It was also the first nonprofit of its kind to be established for the poor, Eastern European Jewish population in Southern Philadelphia.

== History ==
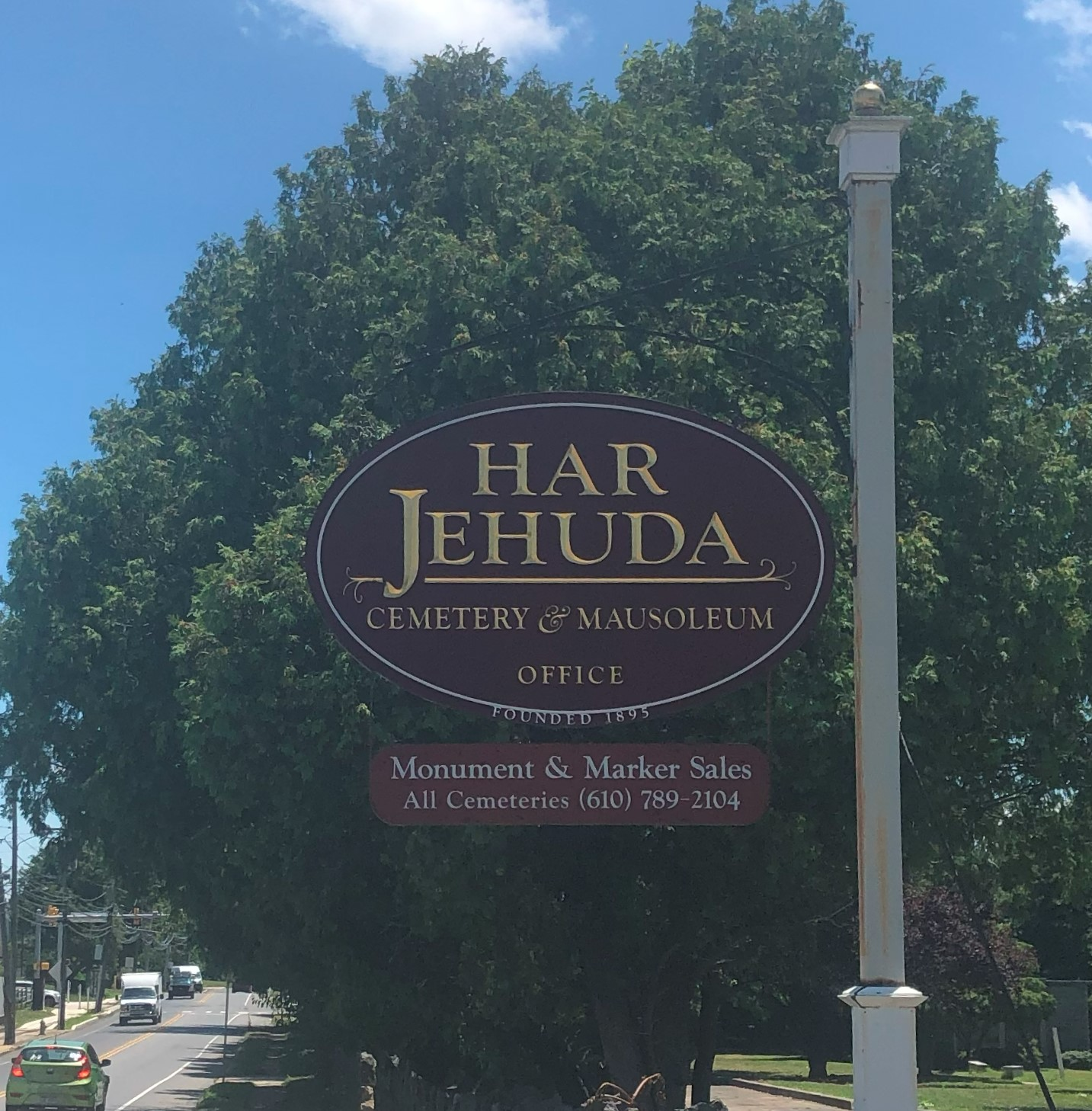
Entrance sign for the cemetery

Har Jehuda was originally founded as Independent Chevra Kadisha Burial Society in 1893. In 1902, the organization established Har Jehuda Cemetery in Upper Darby at its now-current location. Julius Moskowitz, the founder of the cemetery, passed the cemetery to his daughter-in-law Anne Moskowitz following his death, and it is currently owned by Anne’s son, Larry.

Controversy ensued in 1913 when Har Jehuda’s holdings at Chevra Kadisha’s Har Hasetim cemetery were sold to a developer, and over 6,000 bodies were burned for the construction of new housing. In 1995, after plans to bulldoze the cemetery for its valuable real estate, families of those buried in the cemetery along with many local synagogues filed an injunction that prevented the destruction of many of the graves.

Up until the 1950s, the cemetery suffered from many instances of high flooding due to its location at the bottom of hills and its confluence with Naylor’s Run. This issue has largely been solved due to construction and city planning to prevent catastrophic flooding

In June of 1988, a 9-year-old girl was raped within the boundaries of the cemetery.

== Burial controversies ==
The son of the Messianic Jewish leader Martin Chernoff attempted to have his father buried in Har Jehuda in 1985, and following the delivery of his body, the cemetery denied the interment, saying that the cemetery was “for burial of people of the Jewish faith.”

In 1997, Sherry Barone, a lesbian woman, won a federal lawsuit against the cemetery, which allowed her to bury her partner with an epitaph indicating their relationship. The then-owner of the cemetery, Ann Moskowitz, claimed that there had never been an issue with the life partner epitaph, and that they had allegedly been going by the wishes of the deceased’s parents.

== Current state ==
Much of Har Jehuda has fallen into disrepair due to a lack of modern burials in the cemetery, causing a deflating budget for maintenance of the existing graves and surrounding land. 2022 saw efforts by volunteer groups and a nonprofit to help restore dilapidated parts of the cemetery and to keep other parts of the cemetery in working order, concurrent with work to Har Nebo Cemetery in Philadelphia.

== Notable burials ==
- Milton Shapp
