= List of first minority male lawyers and judges in Pennsylvania =

This is a list of the first minority male lawyer(s) and judge(s) in Pennsylvania. It includes the year in which the men were admitted to practice law (in parentheses). Also included are other distinctions such as the first minority men in their state to graduate from law school or become a political figure.

== Firsts in Pennsylvania's history ==
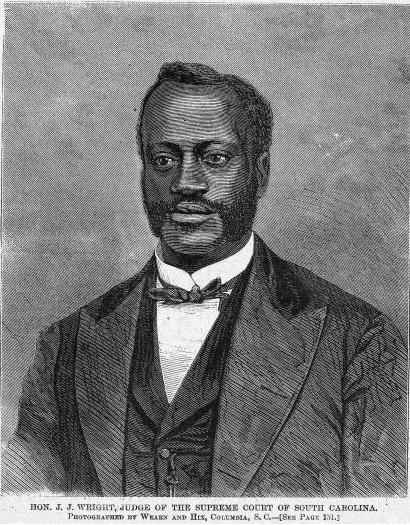
Jonathan Jasper Wright: First African American male lawyer in Pennsylvania (1865)

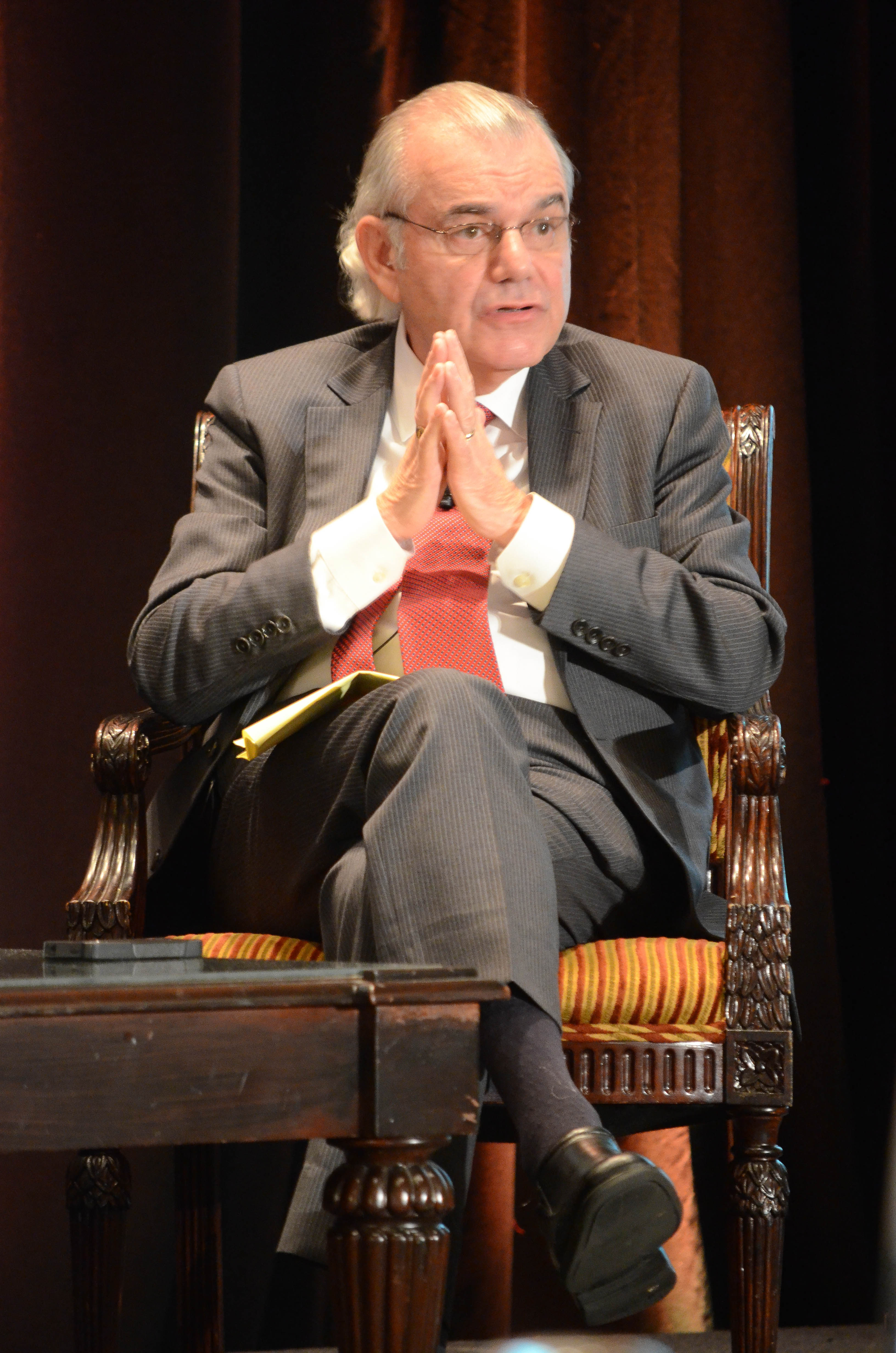
Eduardo C. Robreno: First Cuban American male Judge of the United States District Court for the Eastern District of Pennsylvania (1992)

=== Lawyers ===
- First Jewish American male: Moses Levy (1778)
- First African American male: Jonathan Jasper Wright (1865)
- First African American male admitted to practice before the Supreme Court of Pennsylvania: John D. Lewis in 1876
- First Croat American male: Anthony Lucas (1906)
- First Native American (Sioux) male: Hastings M. Robertson (1907)
- First blind male: Leonard Staisey (c. 1950)
- First Hispanic American male: Juan Silva (1965)
- First Puerto Rican American male: Nelson A. Diaz (1972)
- First Filipino American male (pass bar exam without having first studied law in the United States): Jaime Santos (1973)
- First Latino American male prosecutor: Carlos Vega

=== State judges ===
- First Jewish American male: Issac Miranda in 1727
- First African American male (justice of the peace): Thomas Hazard in 1903
- First African American male (police magistrate): Robert E. "Pappy" Williams around the1940s
- First Italian American male: Eugene Alessandroni in 1927
- First Jewish American male (Supreme Court of Pennsylvania): Horace Stern in 1936
- First African American male: Herbert E. Millen (c. 1910) in 1947
- First Italian American male (Supreme Court of Pennsylvania): Michael Musmanno in 1951
- First African American male (common pleas): Raymond Pace Alexander (1923) in 1959
- First African American male (superior court): Theodore O. Spaulding in 1966
- First African American male (Supreme Court of Pennsylvania): Robert N. C. Nix Jr. (c. 1954) in 1972
- First Asian American male: William M. Marutani in 1975
- First Cuban American male: Eduardo C. Robreno (1978)
- First blind male: Leonard Staisey (c. 1950) from 1979 to 1990
- First Hispanic American male: Nelson A. Diaz (1972) in 1981
- First African American male (Chief Justice; Supreme Court of Pennsylvania): Robert N. C. Nix Jr. (c. 1954) in 1984
- First openly gay male: Daniel Anders in 2007
- First openly gay male of color: Greg Yorgey-Girdy in 2022

=== Federal judges ===
- First African American male (United States District Court for the Eastern District of Pennsylvania): A. Leon Higginbotham Jr. (1952) in 1964
- First African American male (United States District Court of the Western District of Pennsylvania): Paul Allen Simmons (1949) in 1978
- First Cuban American male (United States District Court for the Eastern District of Pennsylvania): Eduardo C. Robreno (1978) in 1992
- First African American male (Chief Judge; United States District Court for the Western District of Pennsylvania): Gary L. Lancaster (1974) in 2009
- First Hispanic American male (U.S. Court of Appeals for the Third Circuit): Luis Felipe Restrepo (1986) in 2016
- First Latino American male (Chief Judge; United States District Court for the Eastern District of Pennsylvania): Juan Ramon Sanchez (1981) in 2018

=== District Attorneys ===
- First African American male: R. Seth Williams in 2010
- First Asian American male: Joe Khan in 2026 (upon becoming the Bucks County District Attorney)

=== Political Office ===
- Daniel Anders: First openly LGBT male (a lawyer) to run for public office and win a judicial seat in Pennsylvania (2007)
- Brian Sims (2004): First openly LGBT male (a lawyer) elected as a state legislator in Pennsylvania (2012)

=== Pennsylvania Bar Association ===
- First Jewish male president: Gilbert "Ott" Nurick in 1967
- First Puerto Rican male admitted: Nelson A. Diaz (1972)
- First African American male president: Michael H. Reed from 2004 to 2005

== Firsts in local history ==
- Homer S. Brown: First African American male judge in Allegheny County, Pennsylvania
- Leonard Staisey (c. 1950): First blind male lawyer and judge (1979-1990) in Allegheny County, Pennsylvania
- Elliot Howsie: First African American male to serve as the Public Defender for Allegheny County, Pennsylvania (2012)
- J. Welfred Holmes: First African American male lawyer in Pittsburgh, Allegheny County, Pennsylvania
- Robert E. "Pappy" Williams: First African American male magistrate in Pittsburgh, Allegheny County, Pennsylvania
- George E. James: First African American male judge in Beaver County, Pennsylvania (1998)
- C. Gus Kwidis: First Greek American male judge in Beaver County, Pennsylvania (2001)
- Angelo A. Santella (1928): First Italian American male lawyer in Altoona, Blair County, Pennsylvania
- Clyde W. Waite: First African American male judge in Bucks County, Pennsylvania
- J. Curtis Joyner (1974): First African American judge in Chester County, Pennsylvania. He would later become a district court judge.
- Juan Ramon Sanchez (1981): First Latino American male admitted to the Chester County Bar Association
- William H. Ridley: First African American male lawyer in Delaware County, Pennsylvania
- Mark C. Alexander: First African American male to serve as the Dean of Villanova University School of Law (2016)
- William C. Haynes: First African American male lawyer in Lancaster County, Pennsylvania, as well as the first African American male to serve as the county's Assistant District Attorney
- Alfred Hemmons: First African American male lawyer admitted to the Lehigh County Bar Association (1975)
- Peter Webby: First male lawyer of Lebanese descent in Luzerne County, Pennsylvania. He would later become the county’s first Public Defender.
- Maxwell H. Cohen: First Jewish male lawyer admitted to the Monroe County Bar Association in Pennsylvania. He was also the first lawyer to hire an African American law clerk and a female law clerk.
- Horace A. Davenport: First African American male judge in Montgomery County, Pennsylvania (1975)
- Daniel J. Clifford: First openly LGBT male judge in Montgomery County, Pennsylvania (2016)
- Mark C. Alexander: First African American male to serve as the Dean of Villanova University School of Law (2016)
- Aaron Albert Mossell (1888): First African American male to graduate from the University of Pennsylvania Law School [Philadelphia County, Pennsylvania]
- Aladino A. Autillo: First male lawyer of Italian descent in Philadelphia, Philadelphia County, Pennsylvania
- Eugene Alessandroni: First Italian American male judge in Philadelphia, Philadelphia County, Pennsylvania
- Greg Yorgey-Girdy: First openly gay male of color to serve as a Municipal Court Judge in the First Judicial District in Philadelphia (2022)
- Bernard G. Segal: First Jewish male lawyer to serve as the Chancellor of the Philadelphia Bar Association (c. 1950s) [Philadelphia County, Pennsylvania]
- Carl E. Singley: First African American male to serve as the Dean of Temple University Beasley School of Law (1983)
- Chuck Patterson: First African American male judge in York County, Pennsylvania

== See also ==
- List of first minority male lawyers and judges in the United States

== Other topics of interest ==
- List of first women lawyers and judges in the United States
- List of first women lawyers and judges in Pennsylvania
