= Raymond J. Broderick =

American judge (1914–2000)

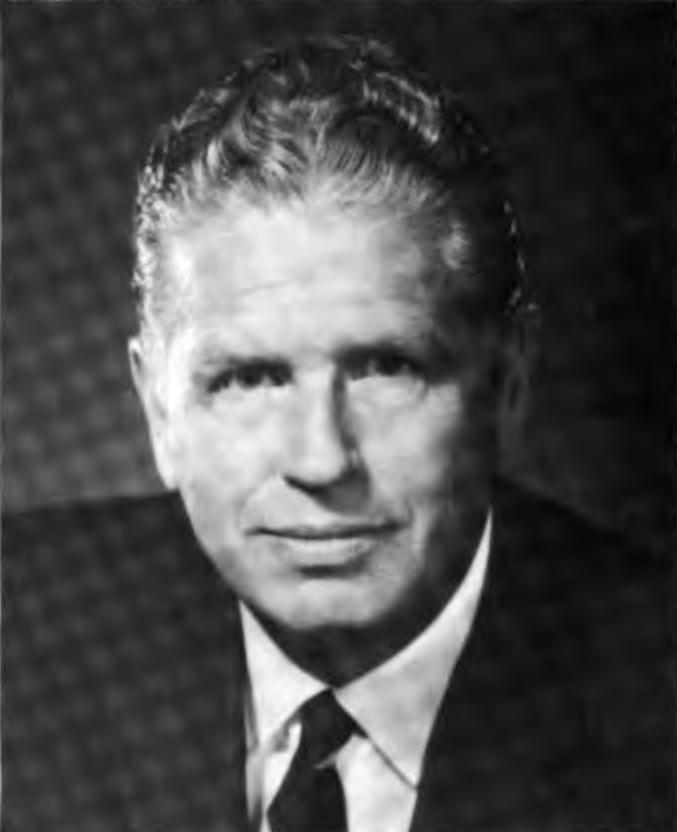

Senior Judge of the United States District Court for the Eastern District of Pennsylvania
- In office July 1, 1984 – August 6, 2000

Judge of the United States District Court for the Eastern District of Pennsylvania
- In office April 23, 1971 – July 1, 1984
- Appointed by: Richard Nixon
- Preceded by: Seat established by 84 Stat. 294
- Succeeded by: Edmund V. Ludwig

24th Lieutenant Governor of Pennsylvania
- In office January 17, 1967 – January 19, 1971
- Governor: Raymond Shafer
- Preceded by: Raymond P. Shafer
- Succeeded by: Ernest Kline

8th Chair of the National Lieutenant Governors Association
- In office 1969–1970
- Preceded by: John Cherberg
- Succeeded by: George Nigh

Personal details
- Born: Raymond Joseph Broderick; May 29, 1914 Philadelphia, Pennsylvania, US
- Died: August 6, 2000 (aged 86) Gladwyne, Pennsylvania, US
- Party: Republican
- Education: University of Notre Dame (A.B.); University of Pennsylvania Law School (J.D.)

Raymond Joseph "Ray" Broderick (May 29, 1914 – August 6, 2000) was an American jurist and politician from the Commonwealth of Pennsylvania. A member of the Republican Party, he served as the 24th lieutenant governor of Pennsylvania from 1967 to 1971 and as a United States district judge of the United States District Court for the Eastern District of Pennsylvania.

== Early life and career ==
Born in Philadelphia, Pennsylvania, Broderick received an Artium Baccalaureus degree from the University of Notre Dame in 1935 and a Juris Doctor from the University of Pennsylvania Law School in 1938. He was assistant counsel to the Rural Electrification Administration (now the Rural Utilities Service) from 1938 to 1941, and was a civilian agent of the Office of Naval Intelligence from 1941 to 1942. During World War II, he was a United States Naval Reserve Lieutenant Commander from 1942 to 1946. While in the Navy, he served on the USS Monrovia in areas such as North Africa, Sicily, Tarawa and Saipan. After the war, he returned to private law practice in Philadelphia.

== Political career ==
Broderick entered politics as a commissioner to Plymouth Township, Pennsylvania from 1952 to 1954. In 1966, after Walter Alessandroni was killed in a plane crash and posthumously won the Republican nomination for Lieutenant Governor, party leaders selected Broderick to replace Alessandroni on the ticket with Raymond P. Shafer. The pair defeated the Democratic ticket of Milton Shapp and Leonard Staisey in the 1966 gubernatorial election. During his term, He served as a delegate to Pennsylvania's 1967 constitutional convention. In the 1970 gubernatorial election, Broderick ran to succeed Shafer against Shapp. This time Shapp won the governorship with 55% of the vote to Broderick's 41%. Broderick's campaign ran an ad in The Philadelphia Inquirer portraying Shapp as a leader of stone-throwing protesters at the 1968 Democratic National Convention. Shapp responded with ads challenging Broderick's credibility on the budget. Governor Shafer proposed a state income tax during his administration to balance the state budget. Broderick broke with his former running mate and promised a balanced budget no income tax, which Shafer deemed was not possible.

== Federal judicial service ==
Broderick was nominated by President Richard Nixon on March 23, 1971, to the United States District Court for the Eastern District of Pennsylvania, to a new seat authorized by 84 Stat. 294. He was confirmed by the United States Senate on April 21, 1971, and received his commission on April 23, 1971. He assumed senior status on July 1, 1984. He took inactive senior status on June 5, 2000. His service terminated on August 6, 2000, due to his death.

== Notable cases ==
One of Brodericks's most significant cases was Halderman v. Pennhurst State School & Hospital in which he ruled that the abuse of mentally disabled patients violated the Equal Protection Clause of the Fourteenth Amendment. He ordered the Pennhurst State School and Hospital in Spring City, Pennsylvania closed and all residents returned to their home communities. The United States Supreme Court vacated the ruling in Pennhurst State School and Hospital v. Halderman; however the case led to a settlement with the state of Pennsylvania and the City of Philadelphia to provide for community-based care of mentally disabled residents.

In the 1979 case, Gilfillan v. City of Philadelphia, Broderick ruled that, under the Establishment Clause, the city of Philadelphia could not use taxpayer funds in constructing a platform for Pope John Paul II to use for a mass on his visit to the city. He ordered the city to seek reimbursement for construction costs from the Archdiocese of Philadelphia.

== Death ==
Broderick died of cancer in Gladwyne, Pennsylvania on August 6, 2000.

Party political offices
Preceded by Raymond P. Shafer	Republican nominee for Lieutenant Governor of Pennsylvania; 1966	Succeeded by Ralph Scalera
Preceded by Raymond P. Shafer	Republican nominee for Governor of Pennsylvania; 1970	Succeeded by Andrew L. Lewis Jr.
Political offices
Preceded by Raymond P. Shafer	Lieutenant Governor of Pennsylvania; 1967–1971	Succeeded by Ernest Kline
Legal offices
Preceded by Seat established by 84 Stat. 294	Judge of the United States District Court for the Eastern District of Pennsylvania; 1971–1984	Succeeded by Edmund V. Ludwig
