= William M. Marutani =

American judge

Personal details
- Born: March 21, 1923
- Died: November 15, 2004 (aged 81)

William M. Marutani (March 21, 1923 – November 15, 2004) was the first Asian-American male judge in Pennsylvania (1975). Marutani was the only Japanese American commissioner to sit on the Commission on Wartime Relocation and Internment of Civilians (CWRIC).

== Early life ==
Marutani was born in Kent, Washington in 1923. While he was attending the University of Washington in Seattle in 1942, Franklin D. Roosevelt signed Executive Order 9066 authorizing the mass incarceration of all people of Japanese ancestry along the West Coast of the United States. Marutani was interned with his family at the Pinedale and Tule Lake Japanese-American internment camps.

Following his release, Marutani served as a member of the U.S. Military Intelligence Service, participating in the postwar occupation of Japan. Following his discharge, he attended the University of Chicago Law School and graduated in 1953.

== Career ==
In 1953, Marutani joined the firm of MacCoy, Evans, and Lewis.

In 1967 as general counsel of the Japanese American Citizens League, Marutani argued before the Supreme Court in support of Richard and Mildred Loving in Loving v. Virginia. The subsequent ruling was a landmark civil rights decision in which the Court ruled that laws banning interracial marriage violate the Equal Protection and Due Process Clauses of the Fourteenth Amendment to the U.S. Constitution.

During the early 1980s, Marutani sat on the Commission on Wartime Relocation and Internment of Civilians (CWRIC).

In August 1983, Judge Marutani of the Philadelphia County Court of Common Pleas, ruled that the single-sex admission policy of Central High School in Philadelphia was unconstitutional. The Board of Education voted not to appeal the legal decision, thereby admitting girls to Central High School.

== Legacy ==
The Judge William M. Marutani Fellowship is awarded every year to current first-year and second-year Asian Pacific American law students attending law school in Pennsylvania and the Greater Philadelphia Area.

== See also ==
- List of first minority male lawyers and judges in Pennsylvania
