= Thomas C. Egan =

American judge

Judge of the United States District Court for the Eastern District of Pennsylvania
- In office August 26, 1957 – July 6, 1961
- Appointed by: Dwight D. Eisenhower
- Preceded by: George Austin Welsh
- Succeeded by: John Morgan Davis

Personal details
- Born: Thomas C. Egan; July 15, 1894 Shenandoah, Pennsylvania
- Died: July 6, 1961 (aged 66)
- Education: Georgetown University (A.B.)

Thomas C. Egan (July 15, 1894 – July 6, 1961) was a United States district judge of the United States District Court for the Eastern District of Pennsylvania.

== Education and career ==
Born in Shenandoah, Pennsylvania, Egan received an Artium Baccalaureus degree from Georgetown University in 1917 and entered private practice in Philadelphia.

== Federal judicial service ==
On August 7, 1957, Egan was nominated by President Dwight D. Eisenhower to a seat on the United States District Court for the Eastern District of Pennsylvania vacated by Judge George Austin Welsh. Egan was confirmed by the United States Senate on August 22, 1957, and received his commission on August 26, 1957. He served in that capacity until his death on July 6, 1961.

== Sources ==
Legal offices
Preceded by George Austin Welsh	Judge of the United States District Court for the Eastern District of Pennsylvania; 1957–1961	Succeeded by John Morgan Davis
