= Ernest Kline =

American politician

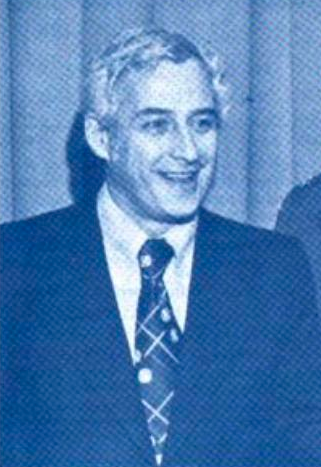
- Kline in 1975

25th Lieutenant Governor of Pennsylvania
- In office January 19, 1971 – January 16, 1979
- Governor: Milton Shapp
- Preceded by: Raymond Broderick
- Succeeded by: William Scranton III

Democratic Leader of the Pennsylvania Senate
- In office August 1, 1967 – November 30, 1970
- Preceded by: John Devlin
- Succeeded by: Thomas Lamb

Member of the Pennsylvania Senate from the 47th district
- In office January 5, 1965 – January 5, 1971
- Preceded by: John Carl Miller
- Succeeded by: John Good, Jr.
- Constituency: Parts of Beaver and Washington Counties.

Personal details
- Born: June 20, 1929 Allentown, Pennsylvania
- Died: May 13, 2009 (aged 79) Hershey Medical Center
- Party: Democratic
- Children: 7
- Education: Duquesne University

Ernest P. "Ernie" Kline (June 20, 1929 – May 13, 2009) was a Democratic member of the Pennsylvania State Senate and the 25th lieutenant governor of Pennsylvania, serving from 1971 to 1979.

== Early life, career ==
Kline was born in Allentown, Pennsylvania and grew up in the Webster neighborhood of Rostraver Township, Pennsylvania. He attended Rostraver High School, where he was the starting quarterback and graduated in 1947. He attended Duquesne University, but was unable to afford completing his degree. He took a career in radio news broadcasting in Charleroi, Connellsville, Kittanning, and at WBVP-AM in Beaver Falls. He entered politics after covering city council; he was elected to the Beaver Falls City Council in 1955. In 1961, he was appointed to be a workers' compensation referee for Beaver, Washington, and Greene Counties.

== Politics ==
He was elected to the Pennsylvania State Senate in 1964, taking office in 1965. In August 1967, he was elected Democratic Floor Leader, becoming the youngest person to hold that position.

He was elected Lieutenant Governor of Pennsylvania on the Milton Shapp gubernatorial ticket in November 1970. As a Western Pennsylvanian, Kline provided balance to the Democratic ticket, which had Philadelphian Milton Shapp. Kline held that position from 1971 to 1979. He was the first Lieutenant Governor to live in State House, the Lieutenant Governor's official residence.

He served as a delegate to the Democratic National Convention in 1972 and 2000. He is credited for taking steps to establish the Governor's Energy Council during the 1973 oil crisis and for leading the Pennsylvania Emergency Management Agency. He ran for the Democratic nomination for governor in 1978, but lost a highly contested primary to Peter Flaherty, who eventually lost to Dick Thornburgh.

== Later life and death ==
Kline retired from political life after his stint as lieutenant governor and served as a lobbyist. He lived in Palmyra, Pennsylvania until his death in 2009 at the age of 79.

Political offices
Preceded by Raymond Broderick	Lieutenant Governor of Pennsylvania; 1971–1979	Succeeded by William Scranton III
Party political offices
Preceded by John Devlin	Democratic Leader of the Pennsylvania Senate; 1967–1970	Succeeded by Thomas Lamb
Preceded by Leonard Staisey	Democratic nominee for Lieutenant Governor of Pennsylvania; 1970, 1974	Succeeded by Bob Casey
Pennsylvania State Senate
Preceded by John Carl Miller	Member of the Pennsylvania Senate for the 47th District; 1965–1971	Succeeded by John Good, Jr.
