= Leonard Staisey =

American politician

Member of the Allegheny County Board of Commissioners
- In office January 1, 1968 – January 5, 1976
- Preceded by: William McClelland
- Succeeded by: Jim Flaherty

Member of the Pennsylvania Senate from the 45th district
- In office January 1, 1961 – November 30, 1966
- Preceded by: Frank Kopriver, Jr.
- Succeeded by: Joseph Gaydos
- Constituency: Parts of Allegheny County

Personal details
- Born: November 10, 1920 Pittsburgh, Pennsylvania
- Died: October 4, 1990 (aged 69) Pittsburgh, Pennsylvania
- Party: Democratic
- Education: Northwestern University
- Occupation: Attorney

Leonard C. Staisey (November 10, 1920 – October 4, 1990) was a Democratic politician from Pennsylvania. Staisey was born in Pittsburgh and lived for most of his life in Duquesne, a nearby mill town. He was a member of the State Senate from 1961 to 1966, when he resigned to run for Lieutenant Governor. Considered a rising star in the party, he ran on a ticket with Milton Shapp, who would lose to Ray Shafer. From 1968 to 1976, he served as an Allegheny County Commissioner and was considered one of the area's last machine politicians. In 1979, he was elected to the position of judge in the Allegheny County Court of Common Pleas, and he served in this position until he resigned due to illness in 1989. The name of Staisey, who was blind from birth, adorns a Carnegie Library of Pittsburgh branch specializing in providing reading materials for the blind and physically disabled.

== See also ==
- List of first minority male lawyers and judges in Pennsylvania

Political offices
Preceded by William McClelland	Member of the Allegheny County Board of Commissioners; 1968–1976	Succeeded by Jim Flaherty
Pennsylvania State Senate
Preceded by Frank Kopriver, Jr.	Member of the Pennsylvania Senate for the 45th District; 1961–1966	Succeeded by Joseph Gaydos
Party political offices
Preceded by Stephen McCann	Democratic nominee for Lieutenant Governor of Pennsylvania; 1966	Succeeded by Ernest Kline
