= John Morgan Davis =

American judge (1906–1984)

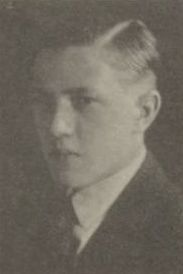
- Davis in 1924

Senior Judge of the United States District Court for the Eastern District of Pennsylvania
- In office May 6, 1974 – March 8, 1984

Judge of the United States District Court for the Eastern District of Pennsylvania
- In office January 7, 1964 – May 6, 1974
- Appointed by: Lyndon B. Johnson
- Preceded by: Thomas C. Egan
- Succeeded by: Edward N. Cahn

22nd Lieutenant Governor of Pennsylvania
- In office January 20, 1959 – January 15, 1963
- Governor: David L. Lawrence
- Preceded by: Roy E. Furman
- Succeeded by: Raymond P. Shafer

Personal details
- Born: August 9, 1906 Shenandoah, Pennsylvania
- Died: March 8, 1984 (aged 77)
- Party: Democratic
- Education: University of Pennsylvania (B.S.); University of Pennsylvania Law School (LL.B.)

John Morgan Davis (August 9, 1906 – March 8, 1984) was the 22nd lieutenant governor of Pennsylvania from 1959 to 1963 and later was a United States district judge of the United States District Court for the Eastern District of Pennsylvania.

== Education and career ==
Born in Shenandoah, Pennsylvania, Davis received a Bachelor of Science degree from University of Pennsylvania in 1929. He received a Bachelor of Laws from University of Pennsylvania Law School in 1932. He was in private practice of law in Philadelphia, Pennsylvania from 1933 to 1952. He was a judge of the Pennsylvania Court of Common Pleas from 1952 to 1958. He was the Lieutenant Governor of Pennsylvania from 1959 to 1963, under Governor David L. Lawrence.

== Federal judicial service ==
Davis received a recess appointment from President Lyndon B. Johnson on January 7, 1964, to a seat on the United States District Court for the Eastern District of Pennsylvania vacated by Judge Thomas C. Egan. He was nominated by President Johnson to the same seat on February 3, 1964. He was confirmed by the United States Senate on March 14, 1964, and received his commission on March 17, 1964. He assumed senior status due to a certified disability on May 6, 1974. His service was terminated on March 8, 1984, due to his death.

== Sources ==
- The Political Graveyard politicalgraveyard.com

Party political offices
Preceded by Roy E. Furman	Democratic nominee for Lieutenant Governor of Pennsylvania; 1958	Succeeded by Stephen McCann
Political offices
Preceded by Roy E. Furman	Lieutenant Governor of Pennsylvania; 1959–1963	Succeeded by Raymond P. Shafer
Legal offices
Preceded by Thomas C. Egan	Judge of the United States District Court for the Eastern District of Pennsylvania; 1964–1984	Succeeded by Edward N. Cahn
