= James E. Ross =

American politician

Member of the Pennsylvania Senate from the 47th district
- In office January 2, 1973 – February 28, 1990
- Preceded by: John Good
- Succeeded by: Gerald J. LaValle
- Constituency: Parts of Beaver, Washington, and Lawrence Counties

Personal details
- Born: January 23, 1921 Koppel, Pennsylvania. United States
- Died: May 22, 1993 (aged 72) Beaver County, Pennsylvania, United States
- Party: Democratic
- Spouse: Dorothy Moravec
- Children: Nine
- Education: Ellwood City High School
- Occupation: Politician

James E. Ross (January 23, 1921 – May 22, 1993) is a former Democratic member of the Pennsylvania State Senate, serving from 1973 to 1990. He resigned on February 28, 1990.

The James E. Ross Highway, a Pennsylvania Turnpike Commission-operated portion of Interstate 376 in Beaver County, Pennsylvania, is named for him.
