= Nelson Diaz (lawyer) =

Puerto Rican judge (born 1948)

Personal details
- Born: 1948 (age 77–78)
- Party: Democratic
- Education: St. John's University, New York (BS); Temple University (JD)

Nelson Diaz (born 1948) is a United States lawyer who has been a Philadelphia city solicitor, a judge on the Philadelphia Court of Common Pleas, and General Counsel at the United States Department of Housing and Urban Development (HUD). He was mentioned as a possible HUD secretary in the Obama administration, before Obama announced that Shaun Donovan was his pick for the position. He ran unsuccessfully for the Democratic nomination for Mayor of Philadelphia, Pennsylvania in the 2015 election.

== Education ==
Diaz grew up in public housing in Harlem, New York. He graduated from St. John's University in New York City with a B.S. in accounting in 1969, having worked his way through school. He earned a Juris Doctor from Temple University in 1972 – "he was the first Puerto Rican at Temple to receive a Juris Doctor ...".

== Public service ==
Diaz served as a special assistant to Vice President Walter Mondale on a White House Fellowship in 1977. He was elected as a judge of the Court of Common Pleas, First Judicial District of Pennsylvania, from 1981 to 1993, and was also a lecturer at the Temple University School of Law from 1983 to 1992. Bill Clinton appointed him HUD General Counsel in 1993, and he served in that position, under Secretary Henry Cisneros, throughout Clinton's first term. Diaz worked for Philadelphia Mayor John Street as the Philadelphia city solicitor from December 2001 through January 2004.

== Private sector ==
As a young lawyer, Diaz worked at Fell, Spaulding, Goff and Rubin (1976–1977) and Wolf, Block, Schorr and Solis-Cohen (1978–1981). After leaving the Clinton administration, Diaz was partner of the law firm Blank Rome LLP from February 1997 until he joined the Street Administration in 2001. Later, he rejoined Black Rome and served there from March 2004 through May 2007. He has served as of counsel to Cozen O'Connor, a Philadelphia-based law firm, since May 2007.

A director of Exelon since January 27, 2004, Diaz serves on the risk oversight, energy delivery oversight and generation oversight committees. He also serves as a director of PECO Energy Company, an Exelon subsidiary.

On October 27, 2016, Puerto Rico Governor Alejandro García Padilla, appointed Díaz as a member of the new board of directors of the Puerto Rico Electric Power Authority. As a recess appointment, he may take office immediately but must receive the advice and consent of the Senate of Puerto Rico in order to serve a full term.

== Non-profit memberships and community involvement ==
Diaz founded the first organization devoted to black and Hispanic law students at Temple University while he was a student there, and he has been a member of Temple's Board of Trustees since 1992. Having been the first Puerto Rican to be admitted to the Pennsylvania Bar Association in 1973, he later succeeded Cesar R. Miranda as executive director for the Spanish Merchants Association of Philadelphia, a self-help group for Hispanics who own or aspire to own businesses. His board and committee memberships include the Free Library of Philadelphia (1982–1993), the Philadelphia Independent Charter Commission (1992–1993), and the World Affairs Council of Philadelphia (1997–2002), and the Pan American Association (2001– ).

== See also ==
- List of Hispanic and Latino American jurists
- List of first minority male lawyers and judges in Pennsylvania
