= Central High School (Philadelphia) =

Public high school in the Logan section of Philadelphia, Pennsylvania

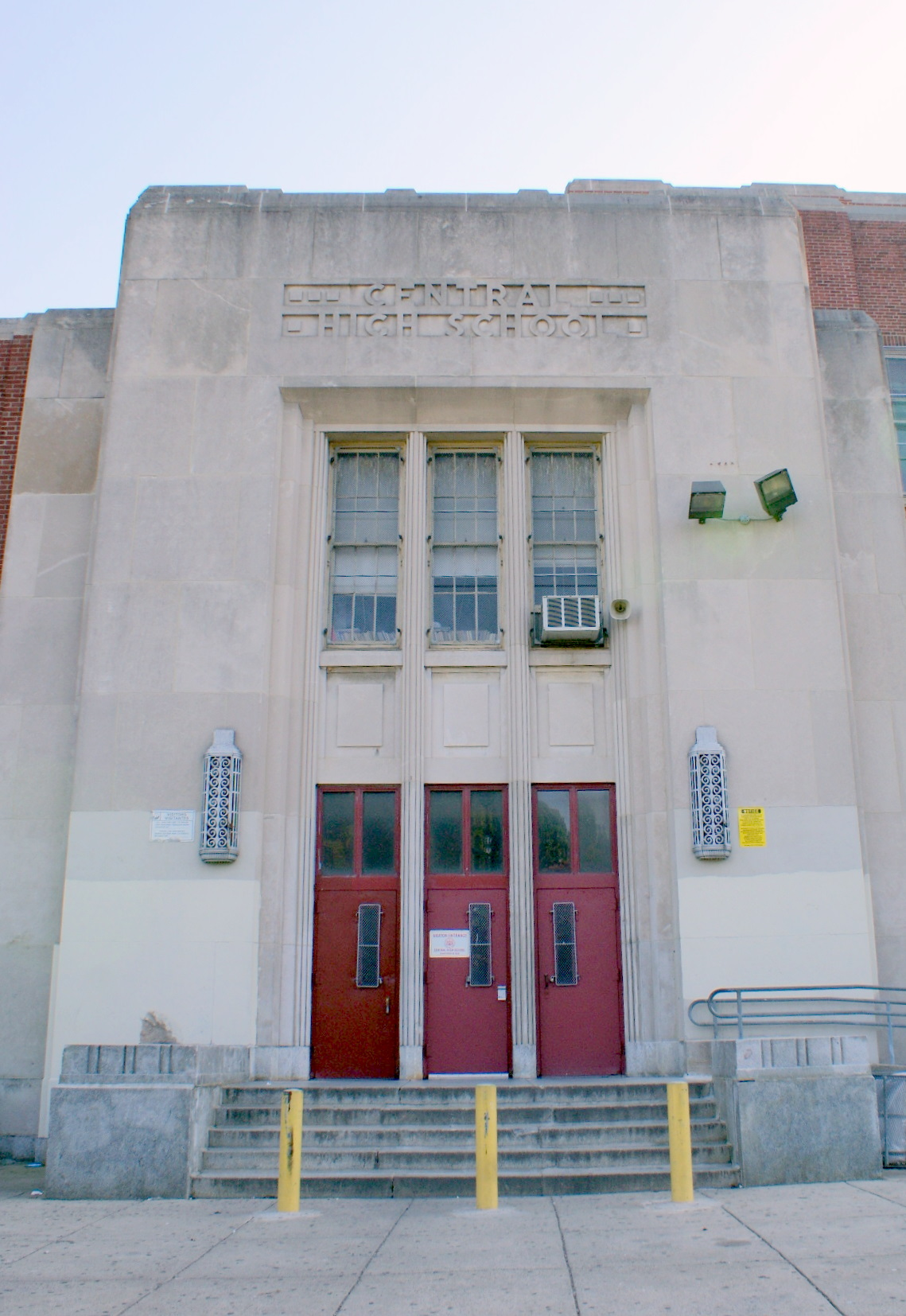

Location
- 1700 West Olney Avenue; Philadelphia, Pennsylvania 19141; United States

Information
- Type: Public high school
- Established: 1836; 190 years ago
- School district: School District of Philadelphia
- President: Katharine Davis
- Teaching staff: 111.70 (FTE)
- Grades: 9–12
- Enrollment: 2,287 (2023–2024)
- Student to teacher ratio: 20.47
- Color
- Athletics conference: Philadelphia Public League
- Nickname: Lancers
- Newspaper: The Centralizer
- Television network: Central Broadcast News (CBN)
- Website: centralhs.philasd.org
- Central High School
- U.S. National Register of Historic Places
- Location within Philadelphia Location within Pennsylvania Location within the United States
- Location: 1700 West Olney Avenue, Philadelphia, Pennsylvania, U.S.
- Coordinates: 40°2′15″N 75°9′00″W
- Area: 5 acres (2.0 ha)
- Built: 1937
- Architect: Catharine, Irwin T.
- Architectural style: Moderne
- MPS: Philadelphia Public Schools TR
- NRHP reference No.: 86003267
- Added to NRHP: December 4, 1986

Central High School is a public high school in the Logan section of Philadelphia, Pennsylvania, United States. Founded in 1836, it is a four-year university preparatory magnet school.

About 2,400 students attend grades 9 through 12. Central High School is the only high school in the United States with authority granted by an 1849 Act of Assembly of the Pennsylvania General Assembly to confer academic degrees upon its graduates. This authority to grant academic degrees led Central to refer to the principal of the school as the "president" of Central High School. The current and fifteenth president of Central High School is Katharine S. Davis.

Central, rather than using a general class year to identify its classes (as in "class of 2021"), uses the class graduating number system (as in "280th graduating class" or "280"). This tradition started shortly after the school's founding, when it was common to have two graduating classes per year – one in January and one in June. In June 1965, semiannual graduations were replaced by annual graduations. As of the 2026–2027 school year, the current senior class is 286.

== History ==
=== 19th century ===
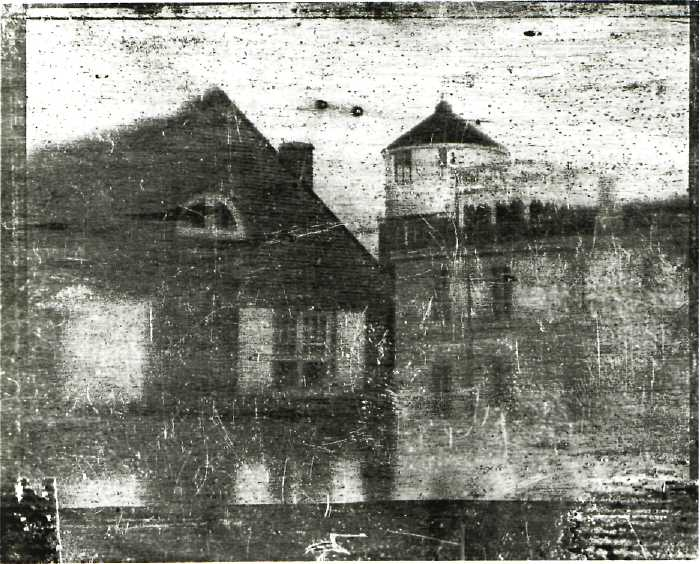
An 1839 daguerreotype of Central High School by Joseph Saxton

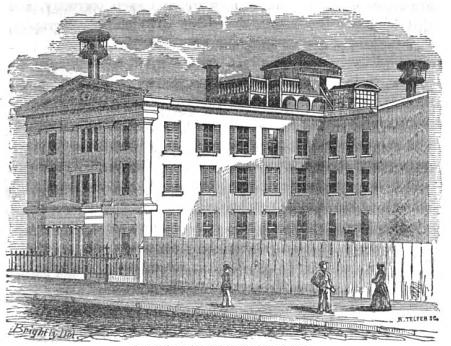
Central High School's first location on Juniper Street near Market Street

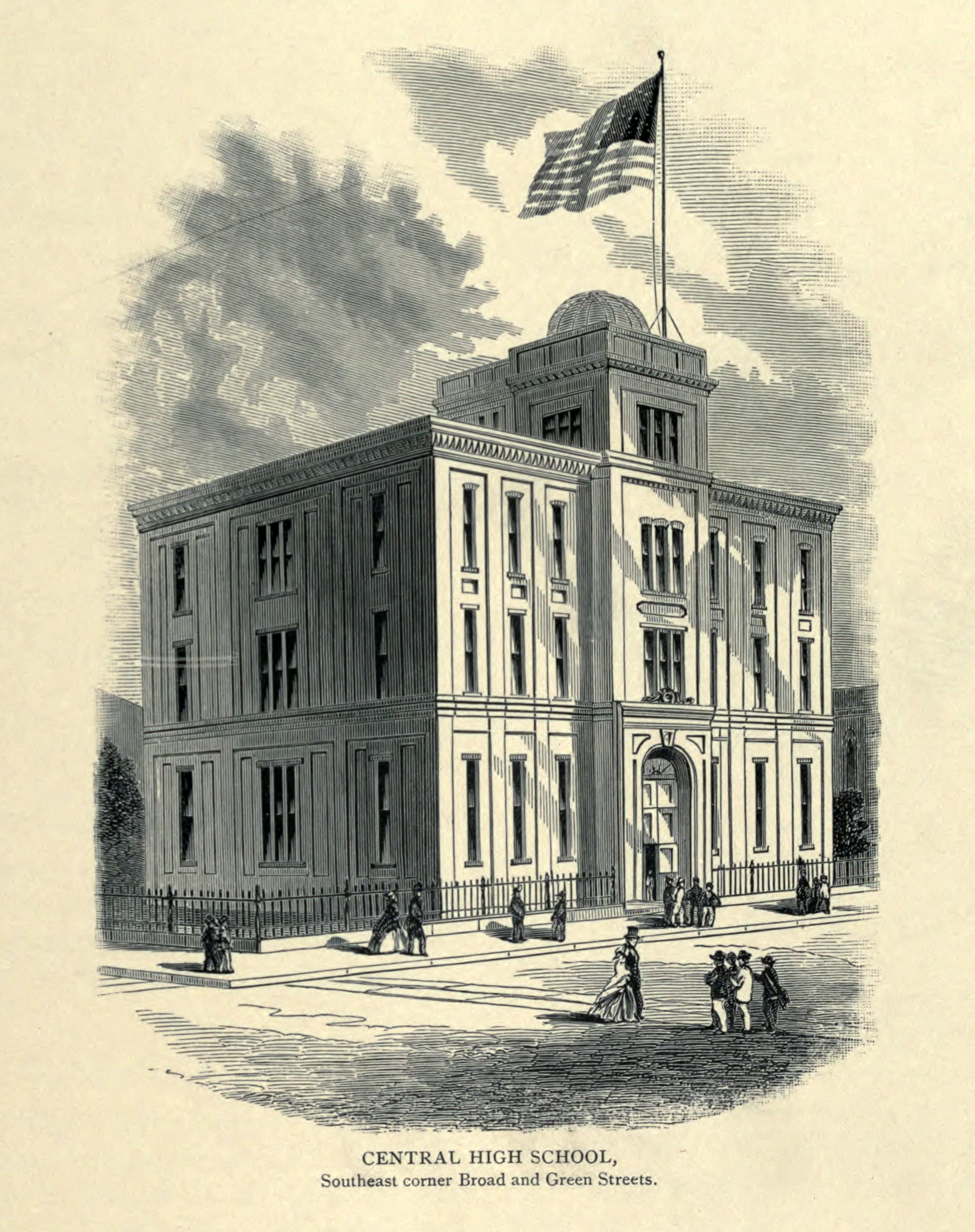
Central High School's second location at the southeast corner of Broad and Green Streets

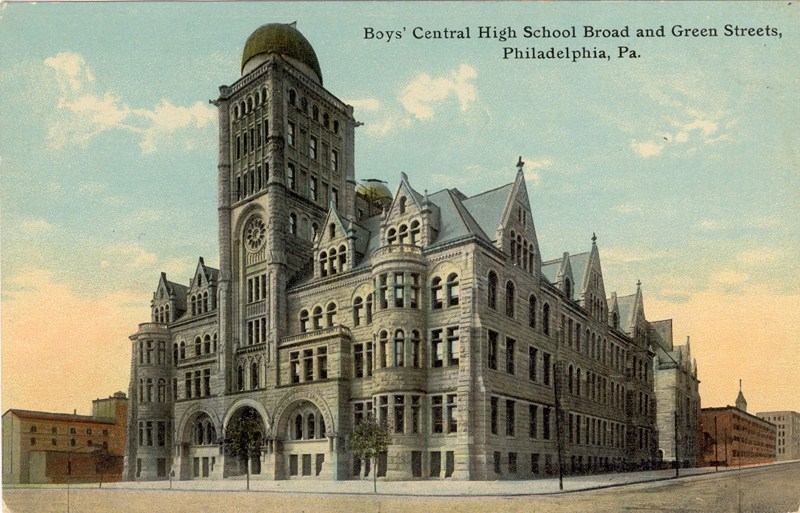
A postcard of the Boys Central High School's location at the southwest corner of Broad and Green Streets

Central High School of Philadelphia was founded in 1836 as "the crowning glory" of Philadelphia's public school system, "the worthy apex to a noble pyramid," and the first "high" school in the state. Because city voters had only reluctantly been convinced of the need for a high school, the curriculum was carefully and publicly tailored to taxpayers' needs. Central's founders made an especially concerted effort to avoid educating students in the manner of private academies of the day, where classical languages and literature were of paramount importance.

The school was chartered by an Act of Assembly and approved on June 13, 1836. A site was purchased on the east side of Juniper Street below Market Street, and the cornerstone was laid on September 19, 1837. The school opened on October 21, 1838, with four professors and sixty-three students.

In November 1839, Alexander Dallas Bache, great-grandson of Benjamin Franklin, and Professor of Natural Philosophy and Chemistry at the University of Pennsylvania, was elected the first President of Central High School. President Bache resigned in 1842 to return to his professorship at the University of Pennsylvania, and was succeeded by John Seely Hart, who had been a professor of languages at Princeton University.

An Act of Assembly approved on April 9, 1849, provided that:

"The Controllers of the Public Schools of the First School District of Pennsylvania shall have and possess power to confer academic degrees in the arts upon graduates of the Central High School, in the City of Philadelphia, and the same and like power to confer degrees, honorary and otherwise, which is now possessed by the University of Pennsylvania." In accordance with this Act, the Board of Controllers on September 11, 1849, authorized the conferring of appropriate degrees upon graduates of Central High.

In September 1854, the school moved to a new building at the southeast corner of Broad and Green Streets. In 1858, President Hart resigned and was succeeded by Nicholas Harper Maguire.

In October 1891 a Graduate Course in Pedagogy, later called the Philadelphia School of Pedagogy, was added to Central as a teacher training program for men. The School of Pedagogy was disbanded in 1920 due to numbers of enrollees dwindling as a result of World War I.

=== 20th century ===
In September 1900, the school moved to its third location in a newer and larger building located at Broad, Green, Fifteenth, and Brandywine Streets. During the formal dedication on November 22, 1902, Theodore Roosevelt, President of the United States, addressed the students. In 1937, it would move to its fourth location, the present Central High School, on Olney Avenue.

The statutory authority to confer academic degrees, initially granted by the Act of Assembly in 1849, was preserved and continued under the Pennsylvania Public School Code of 1949.

Under Section 1611 of the Pennsylvania Public School Code of 1949, any public high school that:

1. existed as of May 18, 1911
2. offered a course of study of not less than four years, and
3. had previously conferred academic or other degrees on its students

shall be continued by the local school board under such name and regulations as the board deems necessary.

Central High School's statutory authority to confer academic degrees, originally granted in 1849, was formally preserved and continued under Pennsylvania law.

After 139 years as an all-male public high school, Central's all-male policy was challenged by Susan Vorchheimer, who sought admission to Central. On August 7, 1975, U.S. District Court Judge Clarence C. Newcomer ruled that Central must admit academically qualified girls starting in the fall term of 1975. The decision was appealed, and the Third Circuit Court ruled that Central had the right to retain its present status. The case eventually reached the U.S. Supreme Court that, on April 19, 1977, upheld the Third Circuit Court's verdict by a 4 to 4 vote with one abstention.

In August 1983, Judge William M. Marutani of the Philadelphia County Court of Common Pleas ruled that the single-sex admission policy was unconstitutional. The Board of Education voted not to appeal the legal decision, thereby admitting girls to Central High School. In September 1983, the first six girls—all seniors—were admitted.

In October 1987, and again in September 2011, Central High School was officially named a Secondary school of National Excellence by the United States Department of Education and named a Blue Ribbon School. In March 1992, Redbook magazine named Central one of the best schools in Pennsylvania. Central was named "Best Secondary School in Pennsylvania" by the magazine each year since they began rating the nation's best schools.

== Presidents of Central High School ==
- Alexander Dallas Bache – 1839–1842
- John Seely Hart – 1842–1858
- Nicholas Harper Maguire – 1858–1866
- George Inman Riché – 1866–1886 (19th Class)
- Franklin Taylor – 1886–1888
- Henry Clark Johnson – 1888–1893
- Robert Ellis Thompson – 1894–1920
- John Louis Haney – 1920–1943 (100th Class)
- William Hafner Cornog – 1943–1955 (146th Class)
- Elmer Field – 1955–1962 (122nd Class)
- William H. Gregory – 1962–1969
- Howard Carlisle – 1969–1983 (162nd Class)
- Sheldon S. Pavel – 1984–2012
- Timothy J. McKenna – 2012–2022
- Katharine S. Davis – 2022–present (264th Class)

== Guide to class numbers ==
Since graduates are usually identified by class number, the year they graduated is not immediately apparent. This section explains the relation between class number and graduation date.

The first class graduated in June 1842. Through much of the school's history, there were two graduating classes per year, in January and June. However, in some years, there was only one graduating class in June, including all years after 1965. The following list details the correspondence between class number and graduation date.

  1 June 1842
  2 June 1843
  3 January 1844
  4 June 1844
… 2 classes per year …
 75 January 1880
 76 June 1880
 77 June 1881
 78 June 1882
 79 January 1883
… 2 classes per year …
 95 January 1891
 96 June 1891
 97 June 1892
… 1 class per year …
116 June 1911
117 January 1912
118 June 1912
… 2 classes per year …
223 January 1965
224 June 1965
225 June 1966
… 1 class per year …

Thus, for classes graduating after 1965, if one knows the class number, one can determine the year of graduation by adding 1741 to it. Conversely, if one knows the graduation year, one can determine the class number by subtracting 1741 from it.
