= 1962 Pennsylvania gubernatorial election =

- November 6, 1962
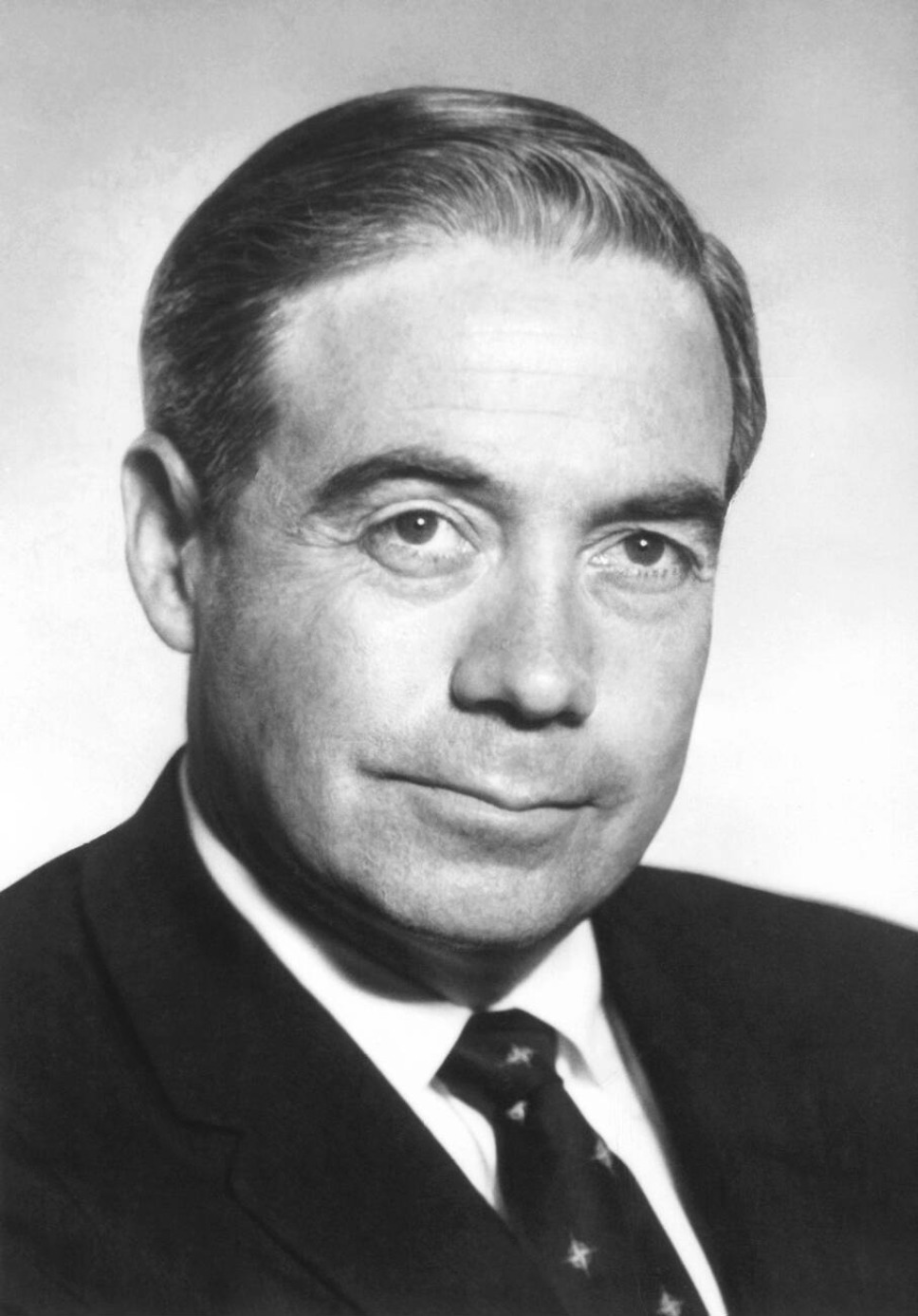

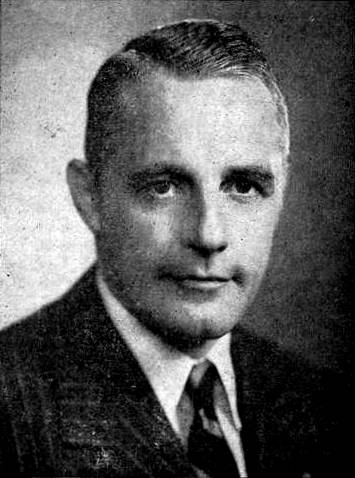
Nominee	Bill Scranton	Richardson Dilworth
Party	Republican	Democratic
Running mate	Ray Shafer	Stephen McCann
Popular vote	2,424,918	1,938,627
Percentage	55.39%	44.28%
- County results Scranton: 50–60% 60–70% 70–80% Dilworth: 50–60%
Governor before election
David Lawrence
Democratic
Elected Governor
Bill Scranton
Republican

The 1962 Pennsylvania gubernatorial election was held on November 6. Republican Bill Scranton and Democrat Richardson Dilworth, each a member of a powerful political family, faced off in a bitter campaign.

== Democratic primary ==
=== Candidates ===
- Richardson Dilworth, Mayor of Philadelphia
- Harvey Johnston, McKees Rocks real estate agent
- Charles Schmitt

Both endorsed candidates easily defeated their primary opposition. Dilworth faced only token candidates, led by McKees Rocks real estate agent Harvey Johnston.

=== Results ===
Democratic primary results Dilworth: 50%–60%; 60%–70%; 70%–80%; 80%–90%

Pennsylvania gubernatorial Democratic primary election, 1962
Party	Candidate	Votes	%
Democratic	Richardson Dilworth	650,692	73.06
Democratic	Harvey Johnston	143,160	16.07
Democratic	Charles Schmitt	96,834	10.87
Total votes		890,686	100.00

== Republican primary ==
=== Candidates ===
- Collins McSparran, president of the Pennsylvania Grange and son of John McSparran
- Bill Scranton, U.S. Representative from Dalton

Scranton was challenged by Collins McSparran of Lancaster County. McSparran, who was the son of former gubernatorial candidate John McSparran, was the president of the state branch of The Grange, and had a small but vocal base in farming interests.

=== Results ===
Republican primary results Scranton: 50%–60%; 60%–70%; 70%–80%; 80%–90%; 90%–100%; McSparran: 50%–60%; 60%–70%

Pennsylvania gubernatorial Republican primary election, 1962
Party	Candidate	Votes	%
Republican	Bill Scranton	743,785	78.06
Republican	Collins McSparran	209,041	21.94
Total votes		952,826	100.00

== General elections ==
=== Candidates ===
- Richardson Dilworth, Mayor of Philadelphia (Democratic)
  - Running mate: Stephen McCann, State Representative from Carmichaels
- Bill Scranton, U.S. Representative from Dalton (Republican)
  - Running mate: Ray Shafer, State Senator from Meadville
- George Taylor (Socialist Labor)
  - Running mate: Benson Perry

=== Campaign ===
After John F. Kennedy received a relatively large win in the state in 1960, combined with a poor showing in the previous year's municipal elections, Republicans attempted to cast themselves in a moderate light and thus chose the rising star Scranton, a so-called "Kennedy Republican" for his socially liberal viewpoints, as their nominee. Scranton, whose only prior elected position was a two-year term in Congress, was immediately attacked for his inexperience. However, Scranton's positions or credentials were rarely the focal point of the election; rather the race was seen as a referendum on Dilworth, a former nominee for this same office, who was serving as the controversial Mayor of Philadelphia.

Throughout his political career, Dilworth had gained a reputation for taking hard-nosed action and for not being afraid to speak his mind. During the campaign, he continuously waged direct assaults on state Republican leaders, asserting that Scranton was a tool of the faltering Republican machine (Dilworth first gained statewide fame for breaking Republican machine politics in Philadelphia in the late 1940s). He also raised the issue of a restrictive covenant that was in place on a Scranton-owned property in Florida, charging that the stipulation that the residence could only be sold to a Caucasian demonstrated that Scranton had racist sentiments; Scranton defended himself by asserting that the condition was placed in the lease by a previous owner and could not be removed, and he countered by criticizing Dilworth for his affiliation with several all-white, elite social clubs. Dilworth was also plagued by corruption charges and, during the course of his campaign, reversed his position from strongly opposing an investigation into city government, to endorsing it as a way to demonstrate a commitment to transparency.

On Election Day, Scranton took 62 of the state's 67 counties in an impressive win. Dilworth struggled not only in GOP strongholds, but also in the heavily Democratic Pittsburgh area, where he was plagued by both the corruption charges and anti-Philadelphian sentiment. His loss was especially heavy in Philadelphia's suburban counties, both because of his involvement in a controversial failed redistricting plan designed to divide upper class GOP support, as well as because of his antagonistic attitude toward suburbanites (he was quoted as saying "if a few of those Main Liners got mugged once in a while, it might teach them a way of life"). Dilworth also won by a smaller than expected margin in his home city, as his personality clash caused city Democratic leaders to give only tepid support.

=== Results ===
Pennsylvania gubernatorial election, 1962
Party	Candidate	Running mate	Votes	Percentage
Republican	Bill Scranton	Ray Shafer	2,424,918	55.39%
Democratic	Richardson Dilworth	Stephen McCann	1,938,627	44.28%
Socialist Labor	George Taylor	Benson Perry	14,340	0.33%
Total votes			4,377,885	100.00%
