= Walter Alessandroni =

American attorney (1913–1966)

Pennsylvania Attorney General
- In office January 15, 1963 – May 8, 1966
- Governor: William Scranton
- Preceded by: David Henry Stahl
- Succeeded by: Edward Friedman

United States Attorney for the Eastern District of Pennsylvania
- In office October 19, 1959 – June 30, 1961
- President: Dwight D. Eisenhower; John F. Kennedy
- Preceded by: Harold Kenneth Wood
- Succeeded by: Joseph Simon Lord III

Personal details
- Born: December 27, 1913 Philadelphia, Pennsylvania, U.S.
- Died: May 8, 1966 (aged 52) Somerset County, Pennsylvania, U.S.
- Party: Republican
- Education: Villanova University; University of Pennsylvania Law School

Walter Edwin Alessandroni (December 27, 1913 – May 8, 1966) was an American attorney who was United States Attorney for the Eastern District of Pennsylvania from 1959 to 1961 and Pennsylvania Attorney General from 1963 until his death in a plane crash in 1966. He posthumously won the Republican nomination for Lieutenant Governor of Pennsylvania in 1966.

== Early life ==
Alessandroni was born in Philadelphia on December 27, 1913 to Joseph and Sally (Asprino) Alessandroni. His father was a lawyer and his uncle, Eugene V. Alessandroni, was a judge of the court of common pleas in Philadelphia. He received his Bachelor of Science degree from Villanova University and his Bachelor of Laws from the University of Pennsylvania Law School in 1938. He was admitted to the bar in 1938.

== Career ==
From 1938 to 1943, Alessandroni was a member of the faculty at Villanova. He was active in Republican politics, serving as secretary of a citizens committee on arrangements for the 1940 Republican National Convention and secretary to Philadelphia mayor Robert Eneas Lamberton.

During World War II, Alessandroni was a Captain in the United States Marine Corps. He served as an assistant chief of staff to a commanding general in the Pacific Theater.

In 1947, Alessandroni was appointed executive director of the Philadelphia Housing Authority. He also served as chairman of the American Legion's national housing committee. From 1948 to 1949, he was national vice commander of the American Legion. In 1949, he was elected state Legion commander. He was the first WWII veteran to lead the Pennsylvania legion. He ran for national commander in 1952, but lost to Lewis K. Gough 2,672 votes to 435.

In 1958, Alessandroni became chancellor of the Philadelphia Bar Association. He was the youngest chancellor in the organization's history.

On June 3, 1959, Alessandroni was appointed to succeed Harold Kenneth Wood as United States Attorney for the Eastern District of Pennsylvania. His appointment was delayed twice – first because the Senate did not promptly act on Wood's nomination to the Eastern Pennsylvania bench, then because Alessandroni needed more time to wrap up his duties at the housing authority. He was sworn in on October 19, 1959. On March 15, 1961, Alessandroni secured the conviction of Abe Minker, who had been in control of the rackets in Reading, Pennsylvania for over twenty years. He resigned as U.S. attorney effective June 30, 1961.

Alessandroni was a candidate in the 1962 Pennsylvania gubernatorial election, but withdrew in favor of Hugh Scott. Scott later withdrew in favor of William Scranton. Alessandroni managed Scranton's successful campaign and on November 12, 1962, Scranton announced that Alessandroni would serve as Attorney General in his cabinet. Alessandroni also managed Scranton's unsuccessful campaign for the Republican nomination in the 1964 United States presidential election.

== Lieutenant gubernatorial campaign and death ==
In January 1966, Alessandroni announced his candidacy for lieutenant governor. He was on the statewide ticket recommended by the Republican State Executive committee and endorsed by Scranton and Scott.

On May 8, 1966, Alessandroni , his wife Ethel, Montgomery County Republican chairman James E. Staudinger, and pilot Melvin E. Ladin were flying from Harrisburg, Pennsylvania to Connellsville, Pennsylvania for a political rally when their Piper PA-23 crashed and burned in the Allegheny Mountains near Somerset, Pennsylvania. As the crash occurred only nine days before the Republican primary, it was too late to remove Alessandroni from the ballot. and state GOP chairman Craig Truax urged voters to vote for Alessandroni over his opponent, Blair F. Gunther, as a show of confidence in the leadership–endorsed ticket and to "continue the traditions of public service he represented". Alessandroni won the primary and was replaced on the ticket by Raymond J. Broderick, who would go on to win the general election that year.. The Civil Aeronautics Board ruled that the probable cause of the crash was "improper in-flight decision or planning" by the pilot.
