= Milton Shapp =

American politician (1912–1994)

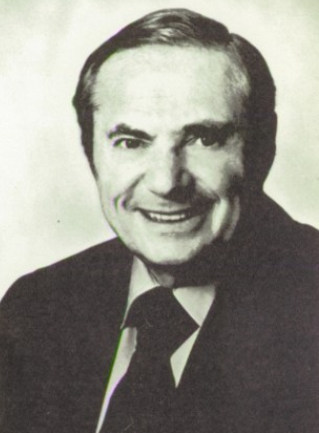
- Shapp in 1976

40th Governor of Pennsylvania
- In office January 19, 1971 – January 16, 1979
- Lieutenant: Ernest Kline
- Preceded by: Raymond P. Shafer
- Succeeded by: Dick Thornburgh

Personal details
- Born: Milton Jerrold Shapiro; June 25, 1912 Cleveland, Ohio, U.S.
- Died: November 24, 1994 (aged 82) Merion, Pennsylvania, U.S.
- Party: Democratic
- Spouses: Harriet Nolte (m. 1939; div. 1947) Muriel Matzkin (m. 1947)
- Children: 3
- Education: Case Western Reserve University (BS)

Military service
- Branch/service: United States Army
- Years of service: 1942–1946
- Rank: Captain
- Unit: Army Signal Corps
- Battles/wars: World War II

Milton Jerrold Shapp (born Milton Jerrold Shapiro; June 25, 1912 – November 24, 1994) was an American businessman and politician who served as the 40th governor of Pennsylvania from 1971 to 1979 and the first Jewish governor of Pennsylvania. He was also the first governor of Pennsylvania to be eligible for, and re-elected to, consecutive four-year terms per the 1968 Pennsylvania Constitution.

== Early life ==
Shapp was born Milton Jerrold Shapiro in Cleveland, Ohio, to Aaron Shapiro, a businessman and staunch Republican, and Eva (née Smelsey) Shapiro, a Democrat and outspoken suffragette. His family was Jewish, and all of his grandparents had emigrated from Eastern Europe. He attended the Case School of Applied Science. (In 1948, the Case School of Applied Science was renamed the Case Institute of Technology and in 1967 it federated with Western Reserve University to form Case Western Reserve University.) He graduated in 1933 with a degree in electrical engineering. Unfortunately, the effects of the Great Depression ravaged America, and Shapp, unable to find work in the engineering field, worked as a coal truck driver. In 1936, he took a job selling electronic parts and moved to Pennsylvania. It was during this time that he changed his name from Shapiro to Shapp to avoid prejudice, even though he continued to identify openly as being Jewish.

== Military and business careers ==
During World War II, Shapp served as an officer in the U.S. Army Signal Corps in North Africa and Europe. After World War II, he moved to Philadelphia and founded Jerrold Electronics Corporation, a pioneer in the cable television industry, using a $500 loan subsidized by the G.I. Bill. Jerrold became one of America's first providers of coaxial cable TV systems in 1948. Jerrold Electronics became a major player in the television industry, and Shapp himself amassed a multimillion-dollar fortune. Shapp sold his interest in Jerrold Electronics in 1967 to the General Instrument Company to concentrate on politics. The Jerrold name, however, survived on cable TV reception equipment until General Instrument went out of business in 1997.

== Entrance into politics ==
Shapp entered the world of politics in 1960 by campaigning for John F. Kennedy for president of the United States. Shapp is credited with promoting the idea that eventually led to the creation of the Peace Corps. After Kennedy was elected president, Shapp served as an advisor to the Peace Corps as well as consultant to the Secretary of Commerce.

=== Pennsylvania gubernatorial elections ===
In 1966, he sought the Democratic nomination for governor of Pennsylvania. The party in Pennsylvania was deeply divided that year and the party organization endorsed Robert P. Casey for the office. Shapp's large personal fortune allowed him to run an independent campaign, and he capitalized on an anti-establishment mood among Democrats and won the Democratic primary by about 50,000 votes with a slogan portraying him as "The Man Against The Machine". Shapp went on to lose the 1966 general election for governor by 250,000 votes to Republican Raymond Shafer.

==== Campaign against Penn Central ====
At the time, Shapp was heavily involved in unsuccessfully trying to stop the merger of the Pennsylvania Railroad with the New York Central. He invested millions of dollars of his own money into the effort, traveling throughout Pennsylvania to convince local officials to oppose the merger. He pushed the issue into the federal courts and testified against the proposed merger in front of the Interstate Commerce Commission. The issue was prominent during his first run for governor in 1966. In the process, he made several enemies. Stuart T. Saunders, president of the Pennsylvania Railroad, opposed Shapp at every turn. Friendly with the Lyndon Johnson administration, Saunders influenced Washington Democrats to sabotage the Shapp campaign.

==== Annenberg's opposition ====
Walter Annenberg, owner and publisher of The Philadelphia Inquirer and major shareholder of the Pennsylvania Railroad, used the pages of The Inquirer to cast doubt on Shapp's candidacy. The opposition from Annenberg-owned media and the Democratic political establishment helped contribute to Shapp's narrow loss that year to Republican Raymond P. Shafer.

== Governor of Pennsylvania ==
As the 1970 election approached, Governor Shafer was term-limited under existing Pennsylvania law, which prohibited self-succession by him, and could neither run for re-election nor take advantage of the amended Commonwealth Constitution ratified in 1968. Furthermore, a fiscal crisis during his term plunged his popularity to a low point, hurting Republican chances of retaining the office. Shapp again sought the Democratic nomination and again defeated Robert P. Casey to win the Democratic nomination. Of his nemeses from the last election, Walter Annenberg had sold the Inquirer to Knight Newspapers, Inc. a year earlier prior to his appointment as ambassador to the United Kingdom, while Stuart Saunders had vanished from the political scene as Penn Central entered bankruptcy in 1970. This time Shapp won the election to become governor of Pennsylvania over Republican Raymond J. Broderick, the then incumbent lieutenant governor and later a well-respected federal judge, by over 500,000 votes.

=== Gubernatorial reforms ===
During Shapp's time in office, he solved a financial crisis by instituting Pennsylvania's flat, no-deductions income tax. He also signed into law the bill creating the Pennsylvania Lottery and instituted major reforms for the Pennsylvania Turnpike. The Governor oversaw new consumer rights legislation, welfare reform, and insurance reform including the controversial decision to enact no-fault insurance legislation in the state. In the wake of the Watergate crisis, he established a sweeping Sunshine Law for the state, the most comprehensive of any state at the time. He also faced a massive recovery effort after Hurricane Agnes caused widespread flooding in the state causing the death of 48 Pennsylvanians. The flooding was so bad and so rapid that Governor Shapp and his wife, Muriel, had to be rescued from the gubernatorial mansion in Harrisburg by boat as flood waters from the Susquehanna River inundated the building.

=== Second term ===
During the Shafer gubernatorial administration, the Commonwealth Constitution had been amended to change the permitted lengths of governors' administrations from one term to the present-day maximum of two consecutive terms at a time, with at least one term required between such gubernatorial administrations.

As Shapp was not term-limited, he successfully sought re-election as governor, winning by a large majority over his Republican opponent, Drew Lewis, in the election of 1974.

== 1976 presidential campaign ==
Milton Shapp for President
- Campaign: U.S. presidential election, 1976
- Candidate: Milton Shapp; 40th Governor of Pennsylvania (1971–1979)
- Affiliation: Democratic Party
- Status: Withdrawn (lost primary)
- Key people: Norval Reece (Manager)
- Receipts: US$913,755.57

Governor Milton Shapp set his sights on the White House and ran unsuccessfully for the 1976 Democratic nomination for president, but failed to carry even his home state of Pennsylvania in the primary elections, and dropped out after an 89-day campaign. After that defeat, he settled into a lame-duck term as governor, enacting no further significant reforms.

== Later years and death ==
In his last years, Shapp suffered from Alzheimer's disease, and died from complications of it on November 24, 1994, at the age of 82. He is buried in Har Jehuda Cemetery. After his death, the Motorola corporation established the Milton Jerrold Shapp Memorial Scholarship Fund, an engineering scholarship, in Shapp's honor. Motorola was the successor corporation to General Instrument, the company that had acquired Shapp's firm in 1967.

Party political offices
Preceded by Richardson Dilworth	Democratic nominee for Governor of Pennsylvania; 1966, 1970, 1974	Succeeded by Pete Flaherty
Political offices
Preceded by Raymond Shafer	Governor of Pennsylvania; 1971–1979	Succeeded by Dick Thornburgh
