= John G. Good =

American politician

John G. Good, Jr.

Member of the Pennsylvania Senate from the 47th district
- In office June 21, 1971 – November 30, 1972
- Preceded by: Ernest Kline
- Succeeded by: James Ross
- Constituency: Parts of Beaver and Washington Counties

Personal details
- Born: May 17, 1926 Pittsburgh, Pennsylvania, U.S.
- Died: April 10, 2003 (aged 76) Beaver County, Pennsylvania, U.S.
- Party: Republican
- Spouse: Wanda F. Anzio
- Children: Richard Good, John Good III, Rob Good
- Occupation: attorney
- Nickname: Jack

Military service
- Allegiance: United States
- Branch/service: United States Navy
- Years of service: World War II

John G. Good, Jr. (May 17, 1926 – April 10, 2003) was a Republican member of the Pennsylvania State Senate. He was elected to represent the 47th senatorial district in a 1971 special election to fill the remaining term of Ernest P. Kline, who has been elected Lieutenant Governor of Pennsylvania.

An attorney, he resided in Beaver County, Pennsylvania, where he died in April 2003 at the age of 76.
