= Keneth Alden Simons =

American television pioneer (1913–2004)

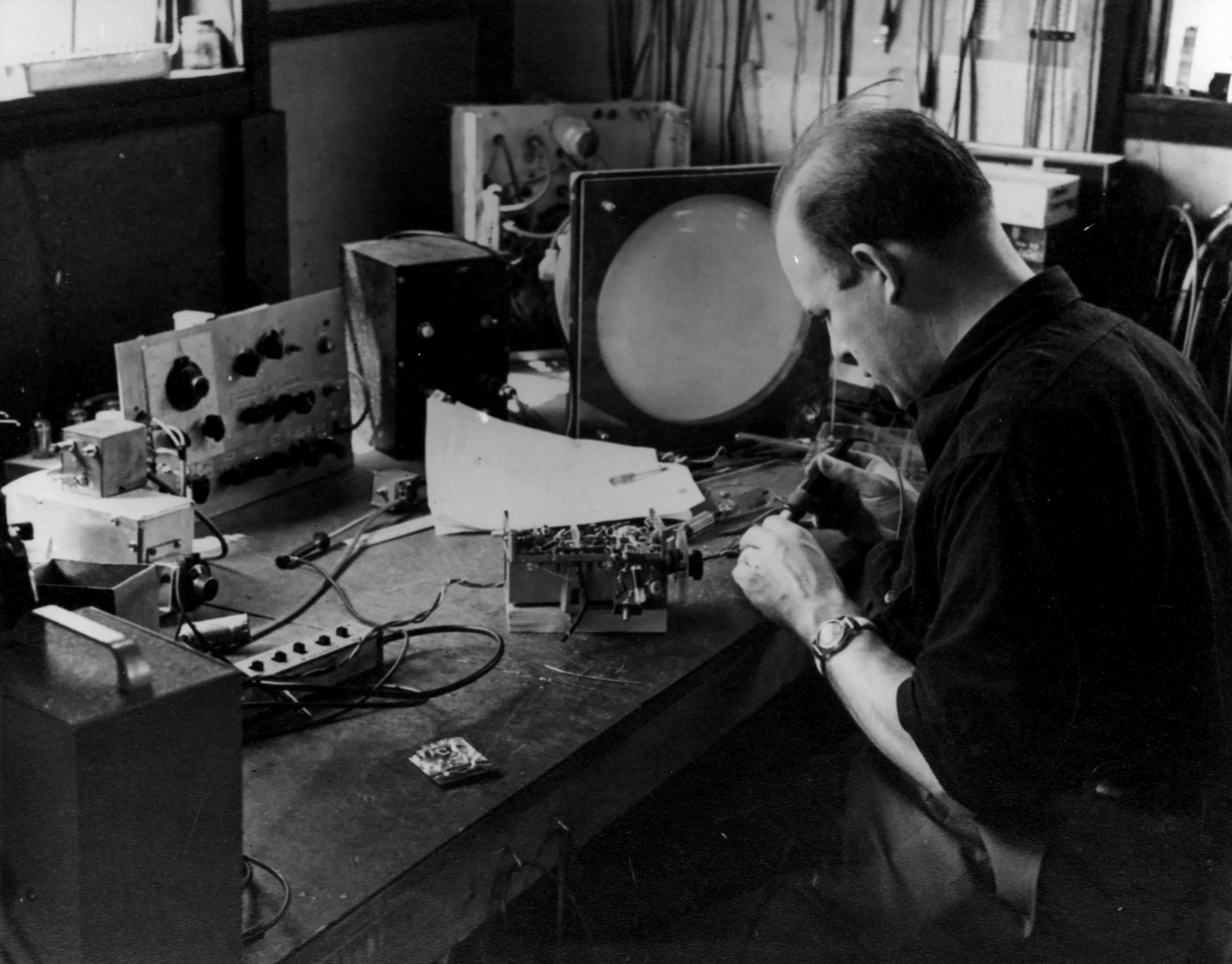
Keneth Alden Simons At His Workbench in the 1950s

Keneth Alden Simons (March 10, 1913 – June 11, 2004) was an American electrical engineer best known for his pioneering contributions to the technical development of cable television in the United States, for the most part as chief engineer for the Jerrold Electronics Corporation. Jerrold was one of the first manufacturers of cable television equipment and also constructed entire cable systems. Simons designed one of the first converters and the two most important pieces of the early test equipment, the Model 704 Field Strength Meter and Model 900 Sweep Frequency Generator. He also authored a seminal technical handbook on cable television systems, and served on national and international engineering standards committees. Fellow cable engineer Archer Taylor stated that Simons was seen as the leading technical expert at Jerrold for over two decades.

== Early years ==
Born in Philadelphia, Pennsylvania, Simons' interest in radio began at an early age, and he obtained his amateur radio license (callsign W3UB) in 1930. Simons started his career as a radio troubleshooter for RCA in 1932 in Camden, and worked for RCA while he attended college. In 1938 he graduated from the Moore School of Electrical Engineering of the University of Pennsylvania, with distinction and recipient of the A. Atwater Kent Prize in Electrical Engineering] (see Atwater Kent Museum of Philadelphia) He then became a television field engineer for RCA. On one occasion in 1939 he and another field engineer installed a television set in the honeymoon cottage of movie stars Robert Taylor and Barbara Stanwyck, and Simons showed her how to operate it. Later Simons helped run the RCA television exhibit at the 1939 World’s Fair. In the summer of 1940 he was sent by RCA to run the public address system and make recordings of speeches on the campaign train of Wendell Willkie, the Republican candidate for president that year.

In 1941 he was a radio engineer for WCAU in Philadelphia, broadcasting live concerts over the radio. From 1942 until 1946 he was the chief instructor for the RCA Signal Corps School. Along with teaching operation and repair of various devices, he wrote instruction manuals on oscilloscope use and synchronous motors.

He moved to Kansas City, Missouri, in 1946 and was the chief television instructor at Central Radio School until 1948. Simons then worked for Sylvania for about a year developing television tuners and an indoor antenna. In 1952 he formed a partnership to design and manufacture direct-coupled oscilloscopes. Due to lack of funding, they ultimately were not produced.

== Jerrold years ==
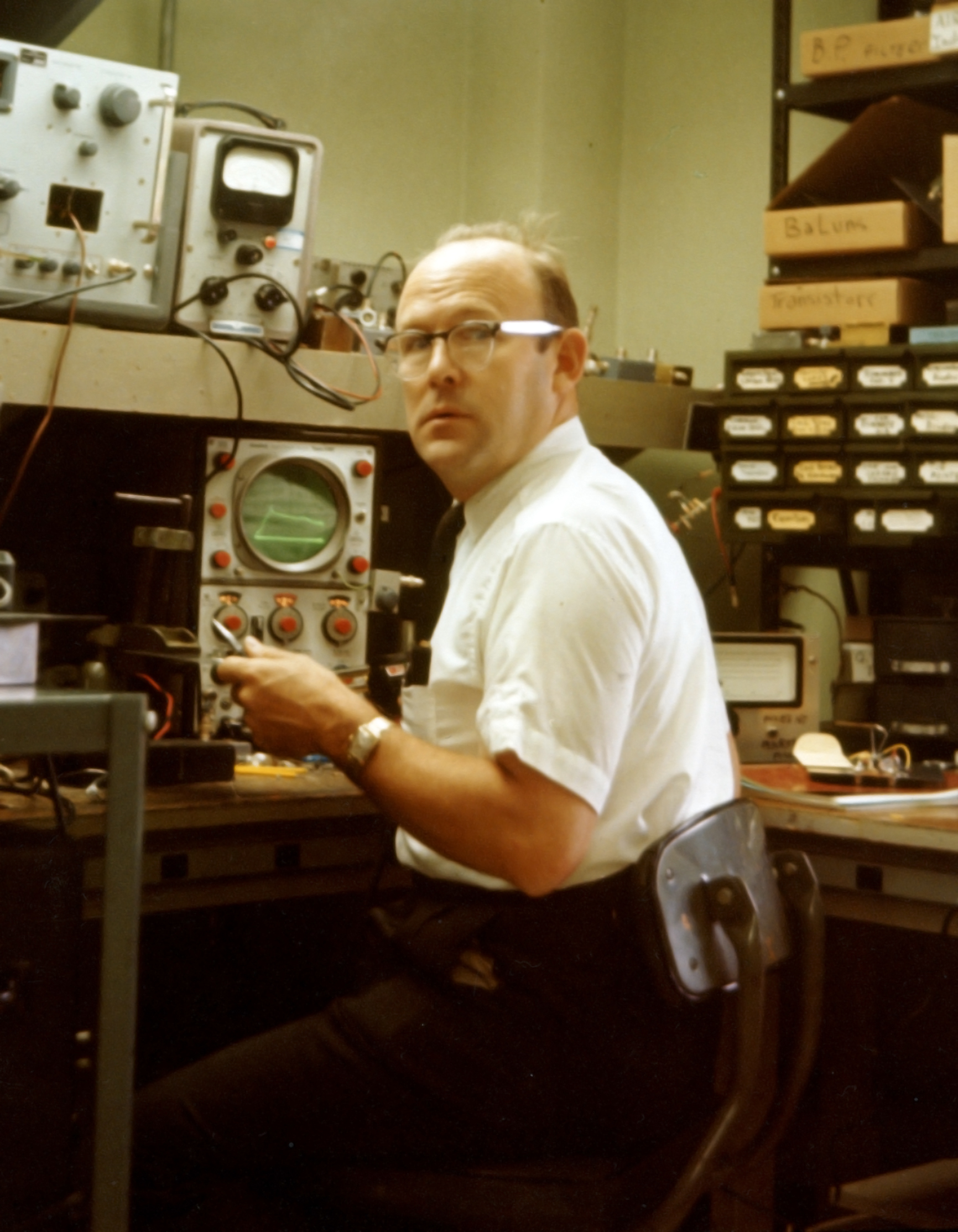
Keneth Alden Simons At His Jerrold Electronics Workbench in the 1960s

Simons began at Jerrold Electronics Corporation as a part-time consulting engineer in 1951. His first project was to design a high-to-low frequency converter. He and other Jerrold engineers worked out of Simons' personal laboratory located on the second floor of a stained glass factory in Bryn Athyn, Pa., until a new Jerrold lab was built in Hatboro, Pa., in 1955. Simons characterized his role at Jerrold in his resume: "Three of us were primarily responsible for equipment design in the early years. Donald Kirk was talented in coming up with new ideas, my contribution was often in getting a system to work, and Henry Arbeiter took all the bright ideas and made them producible." Other engineering colleagues included Eric Winston, Mike Jeffers, Frank Ragone, Caywood Cooley, Vic Nicholson, Len Ecker, and Bill Felsher. Simons successively became chief engineer, chief test equipment engineer, vice president and director of advanced development. Some of his noteworthy designs include the Model 704B Field Strength Meter. In a technology area based on rapid and constant change, the 704B was of note in being in production and use for more than 20 years The 704 name is honored even today in a fraternal organization of its users The Loyal Order of the 704, commemorating the meter’s defining role in cable development. Simons also designed its successor, the Model 727 Field Strength Meter; the Model 900 and Model 1015 Sweep Frequency Generators, and the Model SCA 213 Distributed Amplifier.

Simons held 13 US and foreign patents, published four books, one of which was translated into Spanish. and 37 articles in engineering publications (e.g.). His well-regarded Technical Handbook for CATV Systems went through 4 editions from 1965 to 1985.

Simons served on two technical committees of the International Electrotechnical Commission, part of the International Organization for Standardization, beginning in 1969. He was a life member of the Institute of Electrical and Electronics Engineers (IEEE), a member of the Society of Cable Television Engineers, and a Fellow of the British Society of Cable Engineers.

(For further details on his career at Jerrold, see Simons’ oral history in interview Houser Oral and Video History Collection at The Cable Center)

== Operation Moonwatch ==
As part of the International Geophysical Year, the Smithsonian Astrophysical Observatory set up a national network of amateur-run observation stations to track the early Russian artificial satellites, Sputniks I and II, Operation Moonwatch. As a member of his local Moonwatch group Moonwatch group, he made use of a unique radio-based Doppler tracking system he designed to enhance the accuracy of his team’s sightings.

== Last years ==
Simons retired from Jerrold in 1976. He then served as a consultant for a number of cable industry manufacturers until 1989, and then for the University of Pennsylvania beginning in 1990.

In February 1992, Simons was interviewed by Archer Taylor covering a broad range of topics from his life in cable television. The Audio and Transcript of the interview are now archived in the oral histories maintained by The Cable Center.

Simons had originally patented a directional coupler, U.S. Patent 3,048,798, filed December 24, 1959, that had defined this key component for cable-based distribution of television. Now, 35 years later, he designed another coupler unit, U.S Patent 5,461,349, filed Oct. 17, 1994, a wide-band bidirectional coupler. He expanded on its concept with a proposal for a contemporary bidirectional hybrid copper and optical cable television headend, with a 1 GHz bandwidth and privacy capabilities.

The final innovation he worked on involved getting back together with a friend he had first worked with when both were in college, the distinguished biophysicist Britton Chance. “In BC’s group meeting on every Saturday, he invited his friend Ken Simons (retired from RCA lab) to teach us circuits and electronics.” Chance’s group wanted to construct an optical tomography-based replacement for the standard MRI. Simons collaborated in this effort, attempting to use phase modulation of the illuminating laser to more efficiently measure hemoglobin deoxygenation in body tissue.

Chance later wrote:

“...not only was he a contributor to cable television but he volunteered his unique knowledge to the faculty of the University of Pennsylvania Medical School in developing optical imaging systems for the detection of breast cancer and brain function.”

== Honors ==
In addition to the list of memberships and committee assignments Simons was an invited participant at a variety of standards-setting meetings.

The National Cable Television Association (NCTA) named Simons "CATV Engineer of the Year" in 1965, and he served on NCTA's Ad Hoc Committee on Technical Standards and their Engineering Subcommittee. In 1973 NCTA presented Simons with the "Technical Achievement Award" (now the "Vanguard Award for Science & Technology").

Simons was awarded the first IEEE Delmer Ports Award, in 1978 at IEEE’s annual meeting. He was characterized in the award as a legend in the CATV industry and credited for his role in developing NCTA technology. He was credited as responsible for NCTA noise interference standards and for the measurement of distortion components. His Technical Handbook for CATV Systems was characterized as an indispensable sourcebook on the technical aspects of CATV and for many years the best tutorial available on performance and measurement in CATV.

== Obituary ==
Simons died June 11, 2004.

University of Pennsylvania, Alumni Gazette November/December 2004 issue, Class of 1938

Downey, S. Keneth A. Simons, 91, leader in the cable-television industry

directional coupler description
Ken Simons describes his directional coupler for cable television connections
