= Stephen McCann (politician) =

American politician

Member of the Pennsylvania House of Representatives from the Greene County district
- In office January 1, 1953 – November 30, 1962

Personal details
- Born: 1919 Waynesburg, Pennsylvania
- Died: 1991 (aged 71–72)
- Party: Democratic

Stephen McCann (1919–1991) was a Democratic politician from Pennsylvania. Born in Waynesburg, he lived for most of his life in Carmichaels, a southwestern Pennsylvania coal mining town. From 1952 to 1963, he represented Greene County in the state House of Representatives. In 1959, he was chosen as Majority Leader.

McCann stepped down from his post to run for Lieutenant Governor in 1962; he was the running-mate of Richardson Dilworth, who lost the gubernatorial campaign for the second time in his career. After leaving elected office, he became closely aligned with the coal industry and long served as a lobbyist for mining corporations.

Party political offices
Preceded by John Morgan Davis	Democratic nominee for Lieutenant Governor of Pennsylvania; 1962	Succeeded by Leonard Staisey
