= Jerrold Electronics =

American electronics manufacturer

- Type: Manufacturing company
- Founded: 1948
- Headquarters: Philadelphia, Pennsylvania, United States
- Products: Cable television equipment

Jerrold Electronics was an American provider of cable television equipment, including subscriber converter boxes, distribution network equipment (amplifiers, multitap outlets), and headend equipment in the United States. The company would go on to be one of the first Multiple System Operators (MSO) in the cable business before divesting itself of its cable properties following an Anti-Trust case brought against it by the United States Government.

== History ==
The company was founded by future Pennsylvania governor Milton Jerrold Shapp (the company name was derived from his middle name) in 1948. The company was one of the earliest pioneers of community antenna television systems (cable television). The company headquarters was located at 401 Walnut Street in Philadelphia, Pennsylvania.

During the course of the 1950s Jerrold Electronics gradually expanded their reach in the CATV sector from purely being a supplier to building turnkey CATV systems for potential operators, who inevitably would also purchase a service agreement with Jerrold. By 1953 the company was claiming to have installed 132 systems across the United States, and Fortune Magazine estimated their 1954 revenue at close to $4.5m.

In 1960 Jerrold Electronics merged with Harman-Kardon, Sidney Harman would become president and take over the day-to-day operations of the merged entity while Shapp stood back and retained the position of chairman. However eventually disagreements between the two led to Shapp buying out Harman, who would subsequently go on to take over the Jervis Corporation. In 1967 Harman would successfully buy back the Harman-Kardon business from Jerrold.

Shapp sold the company to General Instrument in 1967. In 1970 General Instrument would appoint John C. Malone as president of Jerrold and he would continue in this role until leaving in 1973. It would eventually be renamed as Jerrold Communications and would keep this name until 1984 when it was merged with VideoCipher into a new subsidiary called GI Communications. However, the Jerrold brand name continued to be used on equipment into the 1990s.

In the late 1990s, the Jerrold name went out of use, and General Instrument merged with Motorola becoming the Motorola Connected Home Solutions division. Motorola Connected Home Solutions was acquired by Arris in 2012. The equipment was popular with many cable pirates by then and by 2005, most cable companies have discontinued use of Jerrold equipment in favor of digital cable.

== See also ==
- Cable television in the United States
- Keneth Alden Simons
