= Commonwealth v. Eberle =

American criminal case

- Court: Supreme Court of Pennsylvania
- Full case name: Commonwealth of Pennsylvania v. Carol Eberle
- Decided: October 7, 1977
- Citation: 474 Pa. 548, 379 A.2d 90

Court membership
- Judges sitting: Michael J. Eagen, Henry X. O'Brien, Thomas W. Pomeroy Jr., Robert N. C. Nix, Jr., Louis L. Manderino

Case opinions
- Decision by: Manderino
- Dissent: O'Brien, Nix
- Benjamin R. Jones and Samuel J. Roberts took no part in the consideration or decision of the case.

Keywords
- Self-defense; duty to retreat

Commonwealth v. Eberle, 474 Pa. 548, 379 A.2d 90 (1977), is a criminal case involving duty to retreat. The case established that in order to counter the justification or excuse of self defense, the prosecution must show that a defendant who used deadly force had a safe opportunity to escape.
