= Commonwealth v. Graves =

1975 Pennsylvania Supreme Court case

- Court: Supreme Court of Pennsylvania
- Full case name: Commonwealth of Pennsylvania v. Daniel Lee Graves, appellant
- Argued: January 10, 1974
- Decided: March 18, 1975
- Citations: 461 Pa. 118; 334 A.2d 661

Court membership
- Chief judge: Benjamin R. Jones
- Associate judges: Michael J. Eagen; Henry X. O'Brien; Samuel J. Roberts; Thomas W. Pomeroy Jr.; Robert N. C. Nix Jr.; Louis L. Manderino

Case opinions
- Majority: Nix, joined by Roberts, Pomeroy, Mandarino
- Dissent: Eagen, joined by Jones, O'Brien

Laws applied
- Superseded by
- Act 32 (1976)
- This case overturned a previous ruling
- Commonwealth v. Tarver (1971)

Commonwealth v. Graves, 461 Pa. 118 (1975), is a case in which the Supreme Court of Pennsylvania recognized that voluntary intoxication can be a defense to a charge of a specific intent crime. The state of Pennsylvania charged Daniel Lee Graves and two of his cousins with the robbery, murder, and burglary; Graves asserted that he had consumed wine and LSD on the day of the incident and had no memory of what he did during that time, and thus did not have the specific intent necessary to be convicted of the crimes. The trial court rejected his legal arguments and blocked him from introducing evidence to that effect; he was found guilty on all three charges and appealed to the Pennsylvania Supreme Court.

The court ruled for Graves in a 4–3 decision, overruling a prior decision, reversing his convictions, and ordering a new trial. The court held that a defendant can introduce evidence of voluntary intoxication if that evidence suggests that the defendant lacked the capacity necessary to form the necessary specific intent. If the evidence establishes a reasonable doubt that the defendant had specific intent, the court held, the jury could not convict of that crime. The dissenters argued that the decision provided a way for people to engage in criminal behavior and escape the consequences. Legal scholars at the time reacted fairly positively to the decision, finding it to be carefully tailored to its objective. Graves was nullified the year after it was decided, when the Pennsylvania General Assembly passed a law stating that voluntary intoxication could only serve as a defense to reduce a murder charge to a lower degree. Graves was given a new trial, found guilty, and sentenced to life in prison.

== Background ==
=== Facts and trial ===
Daniel Lee Graves

Daniel Lee Graves and two of his cousins robbed Sebastiano Patiri and stole from his home. Patiri was injured during the robbery, ultimately leading to his death. Prosecutors charged Graves with first-degree murder under the felony murder rule, as well as burglary and robbery. Graves invoked the intoxication defense at trial, testifying that he had consumed a pill form of LSD and more than a quart (0.95 L) of wine on the day of the incident; he said he had no memory of what had happened.

The defense called a forensic psychiatrist as an expert witness and asked them whether Graves was capable of "form[ing] the specific intent to take or steal" in his intoxicated state. Graves similarly asked that the trial court grant a judgment of acquittal, arguing that because he was intoxicated, he did not have the specific intent required to be found guilty of the crimes he was charged with. The trial court blocked the doctor's testimony and denied Graves' motion with respect to the burglary and robbery, holding that voluntary intoxication is a defense only to a felony homicide charge (Note: Not to be confused with felony murder. A felony homicide charge is a charge of homicide that happens to be a felony; the felony murder rule elevates a homicide to a murder if the homicide is committed in the course of a different felony, like robbery.) and is otherwise not relevant evidence. Graves was convicted on all three charges; he appealed to the Supreme Court of Pennsylvania.

=== Law ===
Generally, the definition of a crime has two parts: The objective component, which represents the concrete action taken by the perpetrator, and the subjective component, which represents the perpetrator's state of mind at the time they took the action. To secure a guilty verdict, the prosecution must prove that the defendant acted with the required intent – intentionally, knowingly, recklessly, or negligently, depending on the offense. Burglary and robbery are specific intent crimes, meaning that the prosecution must prove that the defendant intentionally performed the specific acts they were charged with. (Note: Examples of intent-based crimes that do not require specific intent include assault and common-law murder, in most jurisdictions.) Under the felony murder rule, when a killing occurs in the course of a burglary or robbery, it is treated as first-degree murder.

Since at least 1874, Pennsylvania law has held that a defendant can invoke a voluntary intoxication defense to reduce the charge from first-degree murder to second-degree; the theory was that a defendant cannot perform specific intent while intoxicated, and therefore could not meet the elements of a first-degree murder charge. For a long time, the Supreme Court of Pennsylvania was silent on the voluntary intoxication defense as it related to crimes other than murder, and said little about its interaction with the felony murder rule. Generally, however, lower state courts had allowed voluntary intoxication as a rebuttal against specific intent.

The state high court finally set a rule in Commonwealth v. Tarver (1971), (Note: 446 Pa. 223.) a case revolving around a defendant charged with robbery and felony murder. The defendant argued that they did not have the required specific intent to commit the robbery, which was the crime underlying the felony murder charge. The Tarver court rejected the argument, ruling that while a voluntary intoxication defense can reduce the degree of a crime by pushing against specific intent, it cannot change the crime's fundamental nature. Since robbery does not have degrees, the court ruled, a voluntary intoxication defense cannot be used, and evidence demonstrating voluntary intoxication is not relevant.

Pennsylvania law used to hold that a criminal defendant was responsible for proving their incapacity by a preponderance of the evidence in order to avoid conviction. That changed in Commonwealth v. Rose (1974), (Note: 457 Pa. 380.) when the Pennsylvania Supreme Court held that once a criminal defendant offers enough evidence of intoxication to call their capacity into question, the prosecution has the responsibility of proving capacity beyond a reasonable doubt. The evidence can be taken from the prosecution's case or introduced by the defense; the prosecution does not have to introduce any evidence to rebut the defense, but once the defense raises capacity, the burden of proof rests with the prosecution.

== Supreme Court of Pennsylvania ==
=== Majority opinion ===
The Supreme Court of Pennsylvania ruled for Graves in a 4–3 decision on March 18, 1975, reversing the convictions and ordering a new trial. The court's opinion overruled Tarver and held that evidence of voluntary intoxication can be used to disprove a finding of specific intent. The majority opinion, written by Justice Robert N. C. Nix Jr., found that while "voluntary intoxication neither exonerates nor excuses criminal conduct", the specific intent required to commit the crime may not exist when the defendant is intoxicated enough. The court rejected the idea that the choice to become intoxicated can replace the requirement for specific intent. Since voluntary intoxication can negate specific intent, the court held, evidence of intoxication is relevant if it makes it more likely that the defendant was incapable of forming the necessary specific intent. The court's ruling was construed to only apply to specific intent; if the prosecution cannot prove the specific intent crime beyond a reasonable doubt, the jury can still convict on a lesser charge that does not require specific intent.

Relying on Rose, the high court held that the jury must be sure beyond a reasonable doubt that the defendant had specific intent to commit the crime, and that includes having the capacity to form specific intent; if the jury has a reasonable doubt that the defendant had capacity due to voluntary intoxication, they must acquit the defendant of the specific intent crime. When the defendant calls their capacity to form specific intent into question, the court held, the prosecution's burden of proving specific intent includes rebutting that capacity defense.

=== Dissent ===
The dissenters, led by Justice Michael J. Eagen, sharply criticized the majority's holding, expressing concern that it would significantly constrain the law's ability to protect life and property from criminal conduct. Eagen implied that the court's ruling would allow criminals to escape consequences for their actions simply by getting excessively intoxicated before or during the act; he also argued that a defendant's choice to carelessly intoxicate themselves could serve to prove specific intent.

== Reaction and impact ==
Legal scholars at the time reacted fairly positively to Graves. A paper in the Dickinson Law Review criticized the holding of Tarver, arguing that it came from a place of fear and was not well-grounded in past authority. Graves, the paper stated, carefully drew the lines so that courts could single out a small number of intoxicated offenders for a lesser punishment, while not providing a path for any criminal to escape consequences for their behavior. Chris Farrell predicted in the University of Pittsburgh Law Review that the decision would be unpopular, but he also argued that the dissent's fears were misplaced and that the court made the right choice. He stressed that a defense of voluntary intoxication could be negated if the prosecution proved specific intent in some other way, like evidence of premeditation.

Soon after the high court decided Graves, the Pennsylvania General Assembly passed a law nullifying the court's holding:

Neither voluntary intoxication nor voluntary drugged condition is a defense to a criminal charge, nor may evidence of such condition be introduced to negative the element of intent of the offense, except that evidence of such intoxication or drugged condition of the defendant may be offered by the defendant whenever it is relevant to reduce murder from a higher degree to a lower degree of murder.

The new law proved to be influential and was adopted by several other states; its wording has been the subject of some dispute. The law was only intended to cover cases like Graves, but if taken literally, a defendant could not offer evidence of voluntary intoxication to prove that their act was done by mistake, rather than in a blackout state like in Graves. State courts generally limited the wording to the Graves scenario, with a few exceptions. Montana's version of the law, which does not have an exception for degrees of murder, was challenged before the U.S. Supreme Court in Montana v. Egelhoff; the court affirmed, among other things, that the statute does not violate an accused person's right to present evidence in their own defense.

Daniel Graves was given a new trial in Northampton County; he petitioned for a change of venue because of the publicity surrounding the high court's ruling, but the petition was denied. He was again found guilty in October 1975 and sentenced to life in prison.
