= Anne X. Alpern =

American judge

- Photo, c. 1960

Justice of the Pennsylvania Supreme Court
- In office September 7, 1961 – January 1, 1962
- Preceded by: Charles Alvin Jones
- Succeeded by: Henry X. O'Brien

Pennsylvania Attorney General
- In office January 20, 1959 – August 28, 1961
- Governor: David L. Lawrence
- Preceded by: Thomas D. McBride
- Succeeded by: David Henry Stahl

Personal details
- Born: December 25, 1903 Russia
- Died: February 2, 1981 (aged 77) Pittsburgh, Pennsylvania
- Party: Democratic
- Education: University of Pittsburgh

Anne X. Alpern (December 25, 1903 – February 2, 1981) was an American jurist and politician who served as the attorney general for Pennsylvania and was later appointed to the Supreme Court of Pennsylvania. She was the first woman to hold either position.

== Early life and career ==
Alpern was born in the Russian Empire and moved with her family to Scenery Hill, Pennsylvania, as a young child. Alpern earned a bachelor's degree in education from the University of Pittsburgh in 1923 and a law degree from the University of Pittsburgh School of Law in 1927. After graduating law school, she began working as an attorney for a local law firm.

In 1934, Pittsburgh city solicitor Ward Bonsall hired Alpern as a temporary assistant city solicitor, to assist with a backlog of cases after the election of Mayor William N. McNair. The job was unpaid, but Alpern worked long hours and won a number of cases, and she was promoted the next year to first assistant city solicitor. Alpern served in this capacity for several years, under several city solicitors, and at times she served as an interim solicitor, following the death or termination of an appointed solicitor. In 1942, Alpern was appointed by Mayor Cornelius D. Scully to become city solicitor herself. She was the first woman ever to serve as solicitor of a major American city.

In 1953, after a distinguished career as city solicitor, Alpern was elected to the Court of Common Pleas of Allegheny County as a Democrat.

== Pennsylvania Attorney General ==
In 1959, Governor David L. Lawrence appointed Alpern to serve as the attorney general for Pennsylvania. Alpern was the first woman ever to serve as a state attorney general.

In 1960, Alpern launched an investigation into allegations of electoral fraud involving Democrats in Philadelphia. Her investigation resulted in the indictment, resignation, or termination of a number of state officials. The investigation had been called for by Republican officials, notably Republican state chairman George I. Bloom, but it caused some consternation to Alpern's fellow Democrats, such as Philadelphia Democratic chairman William J. Green.

Early in 1961, President John F. Kennedy offered Alpern a job as head of the Federal Power Commission, but Alpern turned it down.

== Supreme Court of Pennsylvania ==
On July 26, 1961, Governor Lawrence appointed Alpern to the Supreme Court of Pennsylvania to fill a vacancy created by the resignation of Chief Justice Charles Alvin Jones. She was sworn in on September 7. Because she was appointed, rather than elected, to the court, the law required her to run for a full term in a special election that November. She was narrowly defeated in the election by Henry X. O'Brien, a Republican. Analysts attributed her loss in part to the support she lost from Democrats on account of her investigation of electoral fraud as attorney general.

== Later career and legacy ==
After Alpern's defeat, Governor Lawrence appointed her to the seat in the Court of Common Pleas in Allegheny County that had been vacated by O'Brien. In 1962, the University of Pittsburgh awarded Alpern an honorary degree of Doctor of Laws. In 1974, Alpern retired from the court and joined the firm of Berkman Ruslander Pohl Lieber & Engel. She died in Pittsburgh in 1981.

In 1994, the Pennsylvania Bar Association established the Anne X. Alpern Award, which is awarded annually to a female jurist who demonstrates excellence in the legal profession and makes a significant professional impact on women in the law.

== See also ==
- List of female state attorneys general in the United States
- List of female state supreme court justices

Legal offices
Preceded by Thomas D. McBride	Attorney General of Pennsylvania; 1959–1961	Succeeded by David Henry Stahl
