= 1941 Pittsburgh mayoral election =

- November 3, 1941
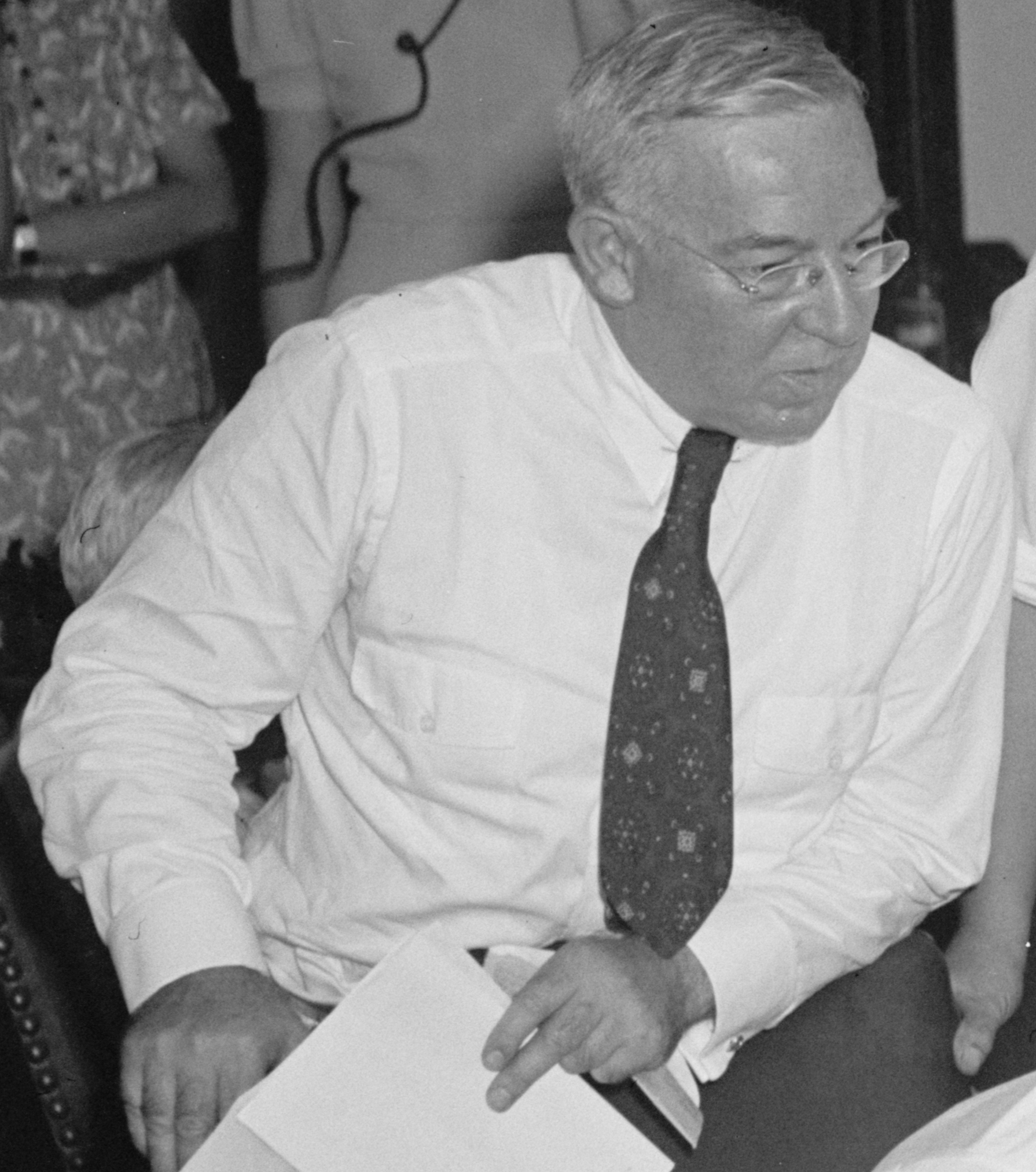

Nominee	Conn Scully	Harmar Denny
Party	Democratic	Republican
Popular vote	112,723	109,560
Percentage	50.7%	49.3%
Mayor before election
Conn Scully
Democratic
Elected Mayor
Conn Scully
Democratic

The mayoral election of 1941 in Pittsburgh, Pennsylvania, was held on Tuesday, November 4, 1941. Incumbent Democratic Party Conn Scully won a second full term by a narrow margin.

== Background ==
Scully had gained a reputation as a weak mayor and his Republican opponent, wealthy attorney and former Pittsburgh Public Safety Director Harmar Denny (a future Congressman), hammered Scully for being a puppet of the city's increasingly powerful Democratic machine. Despite these allegations, Scully remained closely aligned with state party chairman (and future mayor) David Lawrence; while this may have cost him some votes, it gave him enough support from the Democrats' New Deal labor base to put Scully over the top. Republicans contested the result in court, but a judge dismissed the suit.

== Results ==
Pittsburgh mayoral election, 1945*
Party	Candidate	Votes	%	±%
Democratic	Conn Scully (incumbent)	112,723	50.7	
Republican	Harmar Denny	109,560	49.3	
Turnout		222,283		
Democratic hold		Swing		

*These numbers, reported a day after the election, were officially revised later in the month. After a court found irregularities, it ordered further corrections.

Preceded by 1937	Pittsburgh mayoral election 1941	Succeeded by 1945
