= 1937 Pittsburgh mayoral election =

- November 2, 1937
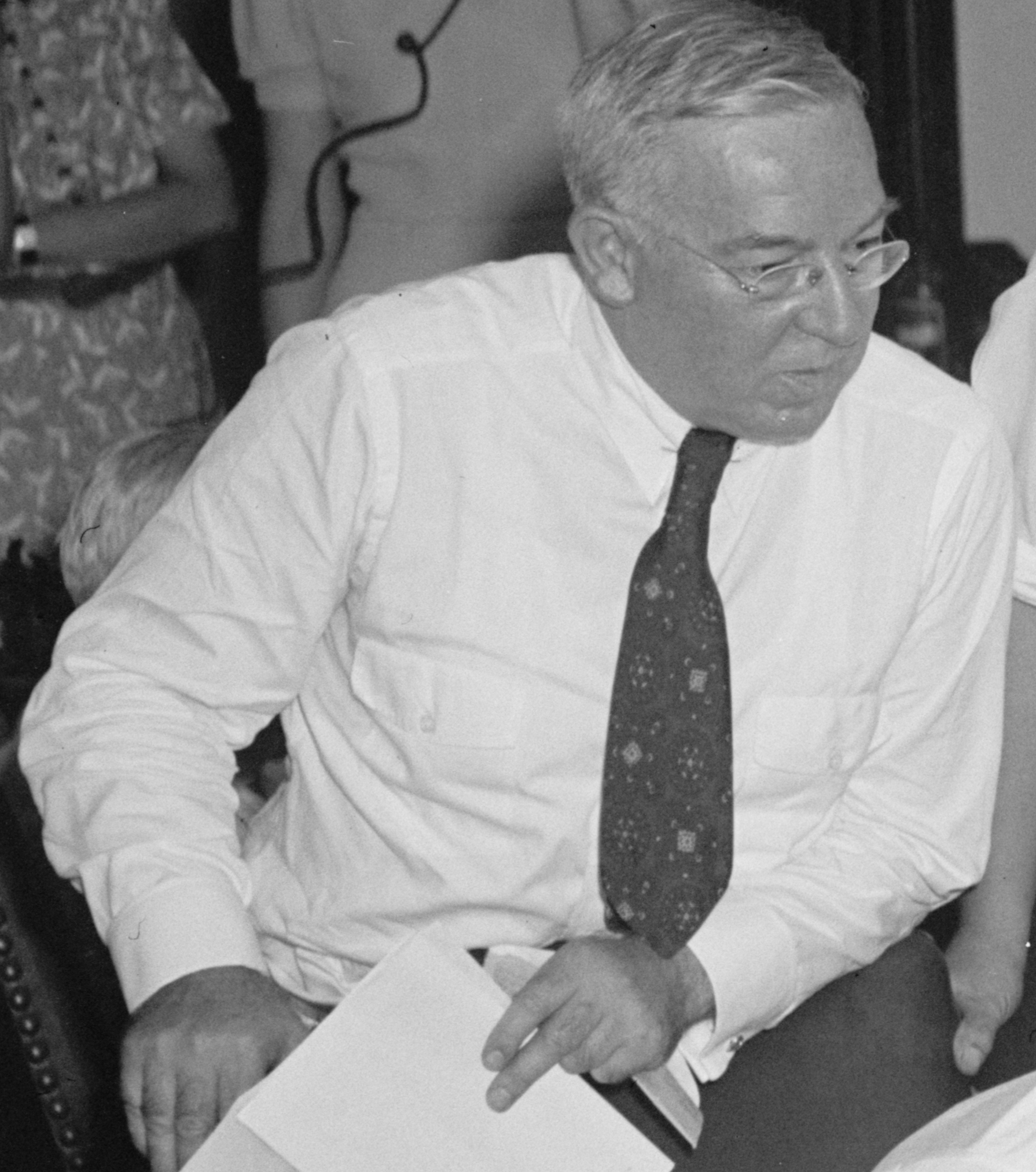

Nominee	Conn Scully	Bob Waddell
Party	Democratic	Republican
Popular vote	122,329	92,019
Percentage	57.1%	42.9%
Mayor before election
Conn Scully
Democratic
Elected Mayor
Conn Scully
Democratic

The 1937 Pittsburgh Mayoral election. was held on Tuesday, November 2, Democratic candidate And Incumbent Mayor Conn Scully, the former City Council of Pittsburgh President who had assumed the executive rank in October 1936, after the resignation of William N. McNair, was elected to a first full term.

== Background ==
The McNair administration had been shrouded in controversy, including hostile relations between the mayor and both city council and the county bureaucracy, as well as a slow response to the devastating St. Patrick's Day Flood. Scully had been a vocal McNair adversary and was closely connected to David L. Lawrence, the state party chairman and city political leader (who later became mayor); this position saved the mayor's office for Democrats, who had been only recently empowered in the city. The race featured a strong GOP opponent in Bob Waddell, the popular football coach at Carnegie Tech (now Carnegie Mellon University).

Councilman Abe Wolk made the formation of a Pittsburgh Civic Light Opera a major campaign issue for both candidates.

== Results ==
Pittsburgh mayoral election, 1937
Party	Candidate	Votes	%	±%
Democratic	Conn Scully	121,075	56.5	
Independent	Conn Scully	1,043	0.4	
Square Deal	Conn Scully	201	0.0	
Nonpartisan	Conn Scully	10	0.0	
Total	Conn Scully (incumbent)	122,329	57.1	
Republican	Bob Waddell	92,019	42.9	
Turnout		214,348		
Democratic hold		Swing		

Preceded by 1933	Pittsburgh mayoral election 1937	Succeeded by 1941
