= 1960 United States presidential election in Pennsylvania =

- November 8, 1960

Nominee	John F. Kennedy	Richard Nixon
Party	Democratic	Republican
Home state	Massachusetts	California
Running mate	Lyndon B. Johnson	Henry Cabot Lodge Jr.
Electoral vote	32	0
Popular vote	2,556,282	2,439,956
Percentage	51.06%	48.74%
County results
Kennedy
50–60%
60–70%
Nixon
50–60%
60–70%
70–80%
80–90%
President before election
Dwight D. Eisenhower
Republican
Elected President
John F. Kennedy
Democratic

The 1960 United States presidential election in Pennsylvania took place on November 8, 1960, as part of the 1960 United States presidential election. Voters chose 32 representatives, or electors, to the Electoral College, who voted for president and vice president.

Pennsylvania had historically been a powerfully Republican state that, owing to industrialization, had become Democratic-leaning following the New Deal. 1960 saw Democrats surpass Republicans in registration for the first time since the Civil War. However, the nomination of the second Catholic presidential candidate, John F. Kennedy, complicated this issue because most of rural Pennsylvania was powerfully Protestant and extremely hostile to voting for a Catholic, creating the potential for large anti-Democratic swings and trends in the northeastern non-Yankee Pocono Mountains. The Pennsylvania Dutch Country had been similarly hostile to Catholicism throughout the state's history. Owing to the opposition to Irish control of the Democratic Party, most of the state's urban Catholics would, before the New Deal, back dominant Republican machines in which they had no actual political power.

However, in 1958 Pennsylvania – a state historically very reluctant to elect Catholics to major offices – had elected David L. Lawrence as governor. Nevertheless, his margin was much smaller than polls had previously predicted, with decreases vis-à-vis the 1954 gubernatorial election even in heavily Catholic urban counties. Kennedy had emerged as the front-runner for the Democratic nomination but Pennsylvania Democrats were reluctant to run him for fear of an anti-Catholic reaction in traditionally Democratic rural counties. However, lobbying by Boston Archbishop Richard Cushing meant Governor Lawrence released 64 of the state's 81 delegates for Kennedy in a bid to stop Adlai Stevenson II from gaining a third nomination.

Pennsylvania narrowly voted for Kennedy over the Republican nominee, Vice President Richard Nixon. Kennedy won Pennsylvania by a slim margin of 2.32%, being aided rather than hindered by his Catholic faith owing to the numerical power of his co-religionists in urban Philadelphia, Lackawanna County, and in the industrial areas around Lake Erie. This clearly outnumbered anti-Catholic sentiment in rural areas, which caused him to lose ground vis-à-vis Adlai Stevenson in 16 rural counties. Kennedy became the first Democrat ever to win the White House without York County and the second to win without Columbia County and Berks County. Kennedy also became the first non-incumbent Democrat since James Buchanan in 1856 to win the state.

== Primaries ==
Pennsylvania held its primaries on April 26.

=== Democratic primary ===
With 81 delegates to the 1960 Democratic National Convention, Pennsylvania was among the largest states to hold a primary. Pennsylvania's nonbinding Democratic primary did not list candidates' names. However, write-in presidential preference votes were allowed. Delegates were elected directly.

By January 1960, the Kennedy campaign became aware of "non-partisan citizen committees" operating in support of Kennedy's candidacy in the state, without any direct connection to his official campaign. However, the state as a whole was still cold on Kennedy. Its liberals were fervent supporters of Adlai Stevenson II, and therefore hoped to see Stevenson nominated for a third time. Philadelphia's Democratic organization, which had a significant sway upon the state's Democratic establishment, was led by William J. Green Jr., who favored the prospective candidacy of Stuart Symington. As the year progressed, Green and other leaders were persuaded by polls to switch their allegiance to Kennedy. Liberal senator Joseph S. Clark Jr. even made it known that Kennedy ranked at least second (behind Stevenson) in his own preference.

However, despite others moving to embrace Kennedy, Governor David L. Lawrence withheld his own support from Kennedy, even as he picked up momentum in the state. Lawrence still reserved hope that Adlai Stevenson could be successfully nominated at the convention. An older Catholic Democrat, Lawrence was public in his belief that the country was still not ready to elect a Catholic president. Kennedy would tell reporters that inquired with him about Lawrence's frequent comments doubting the viability of a Catholic presidential nominee by stating that he was, "deeply disturbed" by them. Referencing Lawrence's own strong victory in the state's 1958 gubernatorial election, Kennedy commented that, "It still behooves him now to be urging that this same opportunity should be denied to others."

Kennedy handily won the primary.

==== Results ====
1960 Pennsylvania Democratic presidential primary results
Party	Candidate	Votes	Percentage
Democratic	John F. Kennedy	183,073	71.3%
Democratic	Adlai Stevenson II	29,660	11.5%
Republican	Richard Nixon	15,136	5.9%
Democratic	Hubert Humphrey	13,860	5.4%
Democratic	Stuart Symington	6,791	2.6%
Democratic	Lyndon B. Johnson	2,918	1.1%
Republican	Nelson Rockefeller	1,078	0.4%
Democratic	Others	4,297	1.7%
Totals			100.00%

=== Republican primary ===
Nixon was the only candidate on the Republican primary ballot and won nearly all of the vote. However, thousands of write-in votes were cast for other individuals.

=== Results ===
1960 Pennsylvania Republican presidential primary results
Party	Candidate	Votes	Percentage
Republican	Richard Nixon	968,538	98.1%
Republican	Nelson Rockefeller (write-in)	12,491	1.3%
Democratic	John F. Kennedy (write-in)	3,886	0.4%
Democratic	Adlai Stevenson II (write-in)	428	0.0%
Republican	Barry Goldwater (write-in)	286	0.0%
Republican	Others (write-in)	1,202	0.1%
Totals			100%

== Results ==
1960 United States presidential election in Pennsylvania
Party	Candidate	Votes	Percentage	Electoral votes
Democratic	John F. Kennedy	2,556,282	51.06%	32
Republican	Richard Nixon	2,439,956	48.74%	0
Socialist Labor	Eric Hass	7,185	0.14%	0
Militant Workers	Farrell Dobbs	2,678	0.05%	0
Write-ins	Write-ins	440	0.01%	0
Totals		5,006,541	100.00%	32
Voter turnout (voting age/registered)				70%/88%

=== Results by county ===
County	John F. Kennedy Democratic		Richard Nixon Republican		Various candidates Other parties		Margin		Total votes cast
County	#	%	#	%	#	%	#	%	Total votes cast
Adams	7,895	37.86%	12,933	62.02%	26	0.12%	-5,038	-24.16%	20,854
Allegheny	428,455	57.07%	320,970	42.76%	1,293	0.17%	107,485	14.31%	750,718
Armstrong	14,799	42.59%	19,883	57.23%	63	0.18%	-5,084	-14.64%	34,745
Beaver	47,182	56.04%	36,796	43.71%	212	0.25%	10,386	12.33%	84,190
Bedford	6,030	32.41%	12,542	67.42%	32	0.17%	-6,512	-35.01%	18,604
Berks	50,572	44.87%	61,743	54.78%	391	0.35%	-11,171	-9.91%	112,706
Blair	19,445	35.48%	35,297	64.40%	67	0.12%	-15,852	-28.92%	54,809
Bradford	6,920	29.82%	16,252	70.04%	33	0.14%	-9,332	-40.22%	23,205
Bucks	57,177	45.70%	67,501	53.95%	438	0.35%	-10,324	-8.25%	125,116
Butler	17,805	38.45%	28,348	61.22%	152	0.33%	-10,543	-22.77%	46,305
Cambria	52,409	58.48%	37,062	41.35%	151	0.17%	15,347	17.13%	89,622
Cameron	1,353	38.80%	2,129	61.06%	5	0.14%	-776	-22.26%	3,487
Carbon	12,391	49.50%	12,586	50.28%	55	0.22%	-195	-0.78%	25,032
Centre	8,601	31.85%	18,357	67.98%	46	0.17%	-9,756	-36.13%	27,004
Chester	30,167	36.18%	53,059	63.64%	147	0.18%	-22,892	-27.46%	83,373
Clarion	5,506	34.74%	10,307	65.04%	34	0.21%	-4,801	-30.30%	15,847
Clearfield	14,212	42.81%	18,911	56.97%	72	0.22%	-4,699	-14.16%	33,195
Clinton	5,965	39.34%	9,184	60.58%	12	0.08%	-3,219	-21.24%	15,161
Columbia	9,322	37.82%	15,310	62.11%	19	0.08%	-5,988	-24.29%	24,651
Crawford	12,050	38.99%	18,754	60.68%	102	0.33%	-6,704	-21.69%	30,906
Cumberland	15,968	30.83%	35,636	68.79%	197	0.38%	-19,668	-37.96%	51,801
Dauphin	33,962	35.33%	61,726	64.22%	427	0.44%	-27,764	-28.89%	96,115
Delaware	124,629	47.79%	135,672	52.02%	482	0.18%	-11,043	-4.23%	260,783
Elk	8,398	53.95%	7,155	45.96%	14	0.09%	1,243	7.99%	15,567
Erie	53,723	50.90%	51,525	48.82%	295	0.28%	2,198	2.08%	105,543
Fayette	41,560	60.35%	27,120	39.38%	181	0.26%	14,440	20.97%	68,861
Forest	828	35.51%	1,497	64.19%	7	0.30%	-669	-28.68%	2,332
Franklin	12,088	35.41%	22,010	64.48%	36	0.11%	-9,922	-29.07%	34,134
Fulton	1,672	38.18%	2,698	61.61%	9	0.21%	-1,026	-23.43%	4,379
Greene	9,645	56.21%	7,498	43.70%	16	0.09%	2,147	12.51%	17,159
Huntingdon	4,710	29.69%	11,116	70.07%	38	0.24%	-6,406	-40.38%	15,864
Indiana	13,174	41.15%	18,756	58.59%	83	0.26%	-5,582	-17.44%	32,013
Jefferson	7,811	36.01%	13,845	63.82%	38	0.18%	-6,034	-27.81%	21,694
Juniata	2,615	35.19%	4,805	64.66%	11	0.15%	-2,190	-29.47%	7,431
Lackawanna	80,098	61.72%	49,636	38.25%	49	0.04%	30,462	23.47%	129,783
Lancaster	33,233	29.70%	78,390	70.06%	266	0.24%	-45,157	-40.36%	111,889
Lawrence	24,309	50.58%	23,646	49.20%	109	0.23%	663	1.38%	48,064
Lebanon	11,761	31.49%	25,525	68.33%	67	0.18%	-13,764	-36.84%	37,353
Lehigh	39,640	42.10%	54,278	57.64%	249	0.26%	-14,638	-15.54%	94,167
Luzerne	102,998	59.10%	70,711	40.58%	562	0.32%	32,287	18.52%	174,271
Lycoming	18,351	37.85%	30,083	62.05%	48	0.10%	-11,732	-24.20%	48,482
McKean	7,767	36.07%	13,699	63.62%	66	0.31%	-5,932	-27.55%	21,532
Mercer	24,243	45.33%	29,109	54.43%	128	0.24%	-4,866	-9.10%	53,480
Mifflin	4,816	31.68%	10,315	67.85%	72	0.47%	-5,499	-36.17%	15,203
Monroe	6,312	35.61%	11,299	63.74%	115	0.65%	-4,987	-28.13%	17,726
Montgomery	92,212	39.18%	142,796	60.68%	318	0.14%	-50,584	-21.50%	235,326
Montour	2,629	38.71%	4,154	61.17%	8	0.12%	-1,525	-22.46%	6,791
Northampton	41,552	50.48%	40,683	49.43%	71	0.09%	869	1.05%	82,306
Northumberland	22,233	44.61%	27,568	55.31%	40	0.08%	-5,335	-10.70%	49,841
Perry	3,413	29.50%	8,134	70.30%	23	0.20%	-4,721	-40.80%	11,570
Philadelphia	622,544	68.02%	291,000	31.79%	1,733	0.19%	331,544	36.23%	915,277
Pike	1,676	29.49%	4,000	70.39%	7	0.12%	-2,324	-40.90%	5,683
Potter	2,715	34.67%	5,099	65.12%	16	0.20%	-2,384	-30.45%	7,830
Schuylkill	44,430	50.10%	44,187	49.82%	70	0.08%	243	0.28%	88,687
Snyder	1,998	19.75%	8,103	80.09%	16	0.16%	-6,105	-60.34%	10,117
Somerset	14,739	41.71%	20,554	58.17%	42	0.12%	-5,815	-16.46%	35,335
Sullivan	1,471	44.79%	1,808	55.05%	5	0.15%	-337	-10.26%	3,284
Susquehanna	5,760	36.07%	10,201	63.88%	9	0.06%	-4,441	-27.81%	15,970
Tioga	4,076	26.86%	11,082	73.04%	15	0.10%	-7,006	-46.18%	15,173
Union	1,993	21.04%	7,466	78.82%	13	0.14%	-5,473	-57.78%	9,472
Venango	8,064	31.90%	17,193	68.01%	23	0.09%	-9,129	-36.11%	25,280
Warren	6,525	35.86%	11,611	63.81%	59	0.32%	-5,086	-27.95%	18,195
Washington	53,729	58.28%	38,348	41.59%	120	0.13%	15,381	16.69%	92,197
Wayne	4,425	32.04%	9,360	67.77%	26	0.19%	-4,935	-35.73%	13,811
Westmoreland	85,641	55.31%	68,825	44.45%	374	0.24%	16,816	10.86%	154,840
Wyoming	2,726	30.56%	6,188	69.36%	7	0.08%	-3,462	-38.80%	8,921
York	39,164	41.02%	55,922	58.57%	393	0.41%	-16,758	-17.55%	95,479
Totals	2,556,282	51.06%	2,439,956	48.74%	10,303	0.20%	116,326	2.32%	5,006,541

==== Counties that flipped from Republican to Democratic ====
- Allegheny
- Beaver
- Cambria
- Elk
- Erie
- Lackawanna
- Lawrence
- Luzerne
- Northampton
- Schuylkill

== See also ==
- United States presidential elections in Pennsylvania
