= Thomas D. McBride =

American judge (1902–1965)

Associate Justice of the Supreme Court of Pennsylvania
- In office December 29, 1958 – January 4, 1960
- Preceded by: John C. Arnold
- Succeeded by: Michael J. Eagen

Pennsylvania Attorney General
- In office December 17, 1956 – December 15, 1958
- Governor: George M. Leader
- Preceded by: Herbert B. Cohen
- Succeeded by: Anne X. Alpern

Personal details
- Born: September 1, 1902 Philadelphia, Pennsylvania, U.S.
- Died: April 4, 1965 (aged 62) Philadelphia, Pennsylvania, U.S.
- Party: Democratic
- Education: University of Pennsylvania; University of Pennsylvania Law School

Thomas Dominic McBride (September 1, 1902 – April 4, 1965) was an American jurist who was Pennsylvania Attorney General from 1956 to 1958 and an associate justice of the Supreme Court of Pennsylvania from 1958 to 1960.

== Early life ==
McBride was born in Philadelphia on September 1, 1902. He received his Bachelor of Arts degree from the University of Pennsylvania in 1924 and graduated from the University of Pennsylvania Law School in 1927. He began practicing law that year.

== Career ==
=== Private practice ===
In 1951, McBride defended Marjorie Hanson Matson, an assistant Allegheny County District Attorney who was accused by Pennsylvania Attorney General Charles J. Margiotti of being a Communist fellow traveller. Margiotti called a series of hearings where he would judge Matson's fitness for office. The case went to the Pennsylvania Supreme Court, which determined that the proceedings were illegal and threw out Margiotti's petition.

In 1952, McBride testified before the United States Senate Committee on the Judiciary that United States Attorney General nominee James P. McGranery "has every assistant U.S. attorney [in the Eastern District of Pennsylvania] terrified. He has every defense lawyer terrified by him and I think he has, in a sense, intimidated some of the other judges" and was unfit to become Attorney General because he "lack[ed] knowledge of the law" and had "arrogance beyond that of any judge I have ever known".

In 1954, McBride was the lead defense attorney in United States vs. Kuzma et al., a trial of several low-level Communist leaders accused of violating the Smith Act. McBride was able to discredit government witness Paul Crouch, leading to United States Attorney General Herbert Brownell Jr. investigating Crouch for possible perjury and examining his suitability as a government witness in future trials. The five-month trial ended in the conviction of all nine defendants, but the verdict was overturned due to a United States Supreme Court ruling on a similar case.

In 1954, he formed the firm of McBride and von Moschzisker with Michael von Moschzisker, son of former Chief Justice of the Pennsylvania Supreme Court Robert von Moschzisker. The following year, he was elected chancellor of the Philadelphia Bar Association. He also served as president of the Voluntary Defenders Association, which represented indegent defendants and was a member of the board of managers of the Glen Mills Schools.

=== Attorney general ===
On November 30, 1956, Governor George M. Leader announced that McBride would succeed Herbert B. Cohen, who had been elected to the state Supreme Court, as Attorney General of Pennsylvania. He took office on December 17, 1956.

In 1957, he served as counsel for the state pardons board, which he was also a member of, during the legislative investigation into the board's leniency. That same year, he and Pennsylvania Auditor General Charles C. Smith each independently investigated cinder purchases by the Pennsylvania Department of Highways. McBride filed a $15,000 civil libel suit against Smith, a Republican, claiming statements he made discredited the way the Justice Department's investigation was being handled.

In April 1958, McBride was accused by United States Senate Select Committee on Improper Activities in Labor and Management counsel Robert F. Kennedy of accepting $7,500 in union funds for personal legal work for Local 107 officer Raymond Cohen. McBride testified that he was paid the $7,500 after local president Joseph E. Grace hired him to contest Teamster president Dave Beck's plan to place the union into trusteeship. He admitted to receiving $4,250 from the union after becoming attorney general – $2,500 for legal work he performed prior to taking office, a $500 Christmas gift, and $1,250 that should have been paid to his former firm, which he sent to the firm after receiving the check. Following McBride's testimony, committee member John F. Kennedy stated that there was "nothing to indicate that [McBride] did anything improper".

Pennsylvania prohibited governors from serving successive terms, meaning that Leader could not run for reelection. He was sought by party leadership to run in the 1958 United States Senate election, but announced he would only do so if one of his four preferred candidates (McBride, Richardson Dilworth, Joseph S. Clark Jr., and David L. Lawrence) received the party's backing in that year's gubernatorial election. According to The News-Dispatch reporter Mason Denison, many Democrats, as well as Republicans, felt that McBride "beyond any shadow of a doubt would have been the best insurance for Democrats on the gubernatorial front". McBride stated that it was "the biggest and most flattering surprise" to be considered for the gubernatorial nomination, but he chose not to run for the nomination, which instead went to Lawrence.

=== Supreme Court ===
On December 5, 1958, Leader appointed McBride to fill the vacancy on the Supreme Court of Pennsylvania caused by the death of John C. Arnold. The appointment was opposed by Democratic Party leaders, including Governor-elect Lawrence, state chairman Joseph M. Barr, and Congressman William J. Green Jr., who wanted it to go to common pleas judge Michael J. Eagen. McBride resigned as attorney general on December 15 and was sworn in as a justice on December 29.

The Democratic state policy committee chose to support Eagen in the 1959 Supreme Court election, but McBride chose to enter the race anyway, running in both the Republican and Democratic primaries. McBride blamed Anti-Catholicism, concerns about his health (McBride suffered from rheumatic heart disease and had undergone cardiac surgery in 1953), and bitterness from his prosecution of Democratic highway employees involved the state cinder scandal for his loss of the party's endorsement. McBride received support from the president of the state NAACP, labor leaders, and bar associations. Although Eagen won the Democratic primary, McBride put up a strong showing, receiving around 45% of the vote and winning 40 of the state's 67 counties. McBride did not campaign for the Republican nomination and was easily beaten by Blair F. Gunther, but surprisingly received 210,000 votes and carried six counties. His term ended on January 4, 1960.

== Later life ==
After leaving the bench, McBride returned to private practice. In 1964, he filed a lawsuit that led to blackface being banned from the Mummers Parade.

On April 4, 1965, McBride suffered a heart attack in his downtown Philadelphia apartment. He was rushed to Hahnemann University Hospital, but died in the emergency room.
