= Judge Stahl =

Judge Stahl may refer to:

- David Henry Stahl (1920–1970), judge of the United States Court of Appeals for the Third Circuit
- Norman H. Stahl (born 1931), judge of the United States Court of Appeals for the First Circuit
