= John M. Walker (Pennsylvania politician) =

American politician in Pennsylvania (1905–1976)

Republican Leader of the Pennsylvania Senate
- In office January 4, 1949 – November 30, 1952
- Preceded by: Weldon Heyburn
- Succeeded by: Rowland Mahany

Member of the Pennsylvania Senate from the 44th district
- In office January 3, 1939 – November 30, 1954
- Preceded by: George Rankin, Jr.
- Succeeded by: Theodore Schmidt

Personal details
- Born: January 15, 1900 leechburg, Pennsylvania
- Died: December 10, 1976 (aged 76) Pittsburgh, Pennsylvania
- Party: Republican
- Spouse: Marie Gordon

John M. Walker (1900-1976) was a Republican politician from Pennsylvania.

== Biography ==
Born on January 15, 1900, in Leechburg, Pennsylvania, Walker was the son of a general manager of Allegheny Steel Company. He studied at Culver Military Academy before serving in the infantry during World War I. After obtaining a degree from University of Pittsburgh's School of Business Administration, he attended the University of Pittsburgh School of Law, graduating in 1925. Following his education, Walker practiced law in Leechburg.

In 1931, he was appointed Special Deputy Attorney General to Governor Gifford Pinchot. From 1939 through 1954, he served in the State Senate, representing parts of Allegheny County. He gained a reputation for his combative anti-tax viewpoints while in the Senate. He later served as a member of Allegheny County's Board of Commissioners. Walker won the party's 1958 primary for Lieutenant Governor, but was part of a losing ticket with Arthur McGonigle.

Walker was appointed Judge of the Courts of Allegheny County in 1964, and retired in 1968.

== Death ==
Walker died on December 10, 1976, at Shadyside Hospital in Pittsburgh.

Pennsylvania State Senate
Preceded by George Rankin, Jr.	Member of the Pennsylvania Senate for the 44th District; 1939–1954	Succeeded by Theodore Schmidt
Party political offices
Preceded by Weldon Heyburn	Republican Leader of the Pennsylvania Senate; 1949–1952	Succeeded by Rowland Mahany
Preceded by Frank Truscott	Republican nominee for Lieutenant Governor of Pennsylvania; 1958	Succeeded by Raymond Shafer
