= Judge Eagen =

Judge Eagen may refer to:

- Claire Eagan (born 1950), judge of the United States District Court for the Northern District of Oklahoma and of the United States Foreign Intelligence Surveillance Court
- Michael J. Eagen (1907–1987), chief justice of the Supreme Court of Pennsylvania
