= 1945 Pittsburgh mayoral election =

- November 6, 1945
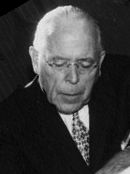

Nominee	David Lawrence	Bob Waddell
Party	Democratic	Republican
Popular vote	115,315	100,976
Percentage	53.3%	46.7%
Mayor before election
Conn Scully
Democratic
Elected Mayor
David Lawrence
Democratic

The Mayoral election of 1945 in Pittsburgh, Pennsylvania was held on Tuesday, November 6, 1945. Incumbent Democratic Party Conn Scully chose not to seek reelection. State Democratic Party chairman and longtime Pittsburgh political player David Lawrence was elected to succeed him in what is the city's most recent competitive race. Bob Waddell, the popular football coach of Carnegie Tech (now Carnegie Mellon University) ran for a second time using his colorful personality and sports fame. However, the powerful Lawrence was able to rally a large base en route to a close win.

== Results ==
1945 Pittsburgh mayoral election
Party	Candidate	Votes	%	±%
Democratic	David Lawrence	115,315	53.3	
Republican	Bob Waddell	100,976	46.7	
Turnout		216,291		
Democratic hold		Swing		

Preceded by 1941	Pittsburgh mayoral election 1945	Succeeded by 1949
