= List of U.S. state supreme court cases =

Every year, each of the 50 U.S. states decides hundreds of cases in their courts of last resort. Of those cases dealing with state law, a few significantly shape or re-shape the law of their state or are so influential that they later become models for decisions of other states or the federal government, or are noted for being rejected by other jurisdictions. The same is true of those cases involving a federal question, except that these may be appealed to the United States Supreme Court. This list contains notable final decisions of these courts – those that were not subject to appeal, or from which no appeal was taken, or from which an appeal was taken but certiorari was denied. Appealed decisions that are notable primarily because of later actions of the U.S. Supreme Court covered in the listings of U.S. Supreme Court cases. The decisions are listed in chronological order.

== List of cases ==
- Wood v. Lucy, Lady Duff-Gordon, 222 N.Y. 88 (1917): A contract for exclusive representation implied consideration.
- Dodge v. Ford Motor Co., 204 Mich. 459 (1919): Owners of a company with investors have a duty to operate the business for profitable purposes as opposed to charitable purposes.
- Meinhard v. Salmon, 249 N.Y. 458 (1928): A fiduciary duty exists between business partners.
- Palsgraf v. Long Island Railroad Co., 248 N.Y. 339 (1928): Liability for injuries caused by negligence extends only to those within a zone of danger within which the injury was foreseeable.
- Hawkins v. McGee, 84 N.H. 114 (1929): Expectation damages in contracts.
- Lucy v. Zehmer, 196 Va. 493 (1954): Validity of a contract based on reasonable inferences drawn from other party's behavior
- Garratt v. Dailey, 46 Wash. 2d 197 (1955): Tortious intent of a child
- Katko v. Briney, 183 Iowa 657 (1971): Landowners have no right to set deadly traps against trespassers on their property.
- Baker v. Nelson, 291 Minn. 310 (1971): Same-sex marriage prohibited in Minnesota.
- People v. Anderson, 64 Cal. 2d 633 (1972): Capital punishment unconstitutional in California
- Commonwealth v. Graves, 461 Pa. 118 (1975): Intoxication is a defense to specific intent crimes where it establishes a reasonable doubt that the defendant had the necessary intent to commit the crime.
- Li v. Yellow Cab Co., 13 Cal. 3d 804 (1975): comparative negligence
- Tarasoff v. Regents of the University of California, 17 Cal. 3d 425 (1976): Mental health professionals have a duty to protect specific persons who were threatened by their patients.
- People v. Mayberry, 31 Cal. 3d 335 (1982): A police dog sniff of airport luggage does not constitute a search under the Fourth Amendment to the United States Constitution.
- In re Lindsey, 101 Wash. 2d 299 (1984): When a cohabiting couple separates, property should be split between them in a "just and equitable" way (analogous to the marriage dissolution statute), rather than going strictly by who held title.
- Stallman v. Youngquist, 125 Ill. 2d 267 (1988): Parents are not liable to their children for damage done in utero.
- Connell v. Francisco, 127 Wash. 2d 339 (1995): The court's decision in In re Lindsey only applies to property shared between the parties.
- Swanson v. Roman Catholic Bishop, 692 A.2d 441 (Me. 1997): The U.S. and Maine Constitutions' freedom of religion clauses protect churches from negligent supervision claims. (Note: Narrowed by Fortin v. Roman Catholic Bishop, 871 A.2d 1208 (Me. 2005).)
- Doe v. Garcia, 131 Idaho 578 (1998): Hospital is potentially liable for hiring a respiratory therapist who molested a minor patient after being terminated, given that he was terminated from his previous job for molestation. The hospital's employment assistance program and the previous hospital were both aware and did not disclose the information. (Note: Abrogated by Hunter v. State, 138 Idaho 44 (2002).)
- Creel v. Lilly, 354 Md. 77 (1999): The Uniform Partnership Act and the Revised Uniform Partnership Act do not allow the estate of a deceased partner to force a sale of the partnership's assets.
- Goodridge v. Department of Public Health, 440 Mass. 309 (2003): Right of same-sex couples to marry in Massachusetts.
- Bush v. Schiavo, 885 So. 2d 321 (Fla. 2004): A law enacted to permit the governor to retroactively stay court-ordered removal of a feeding tube was an unconstitutional invasion of the separation of powers.
- People v. LaValle, 3 N.Y.3d 88 (2004): Death penalty statute declared unconstitutional in New York.
- Lewis v. Harris, 188 N.J. 415 (2006): Holding that same-sex couples deserve equal rights under the law, but stopping short of creating same-sex marriage.
- Varnum v. Brien, 763 N.W.2d 862 (Iowa 2009): Holding that Iowa's defense of marriage act violated the equal protection clause of the Iowa Constitution.
- In re Neely, 390 P.3d 728 (Wyo. 2017): State judicial ethics code prevents judge from publicly proclaiming that she will not perform same-sex marriages.

== See also ==
- List of sources of law in the United States
- List of United States Supreme Court cases
- List of notable United States Courts of Appeals cases
