= Thomas McBride =

Thomas or Tom McBride may refer to:

- Thomas McBride (footballer) (born 1992), footballer from Derry, Northern Ireland
- Thomas A. McBride (1847–1930), American attorney and judge in Oregon
- Thomas D. McBride (1902–1965), American attorney and judge in Pennsylvania
- Thomas George McBride (1867–1950), Progressive party member of the Canadian House of Commons
- Tom McBride (baseball) (1914–2001), professional baseball outfielder
- Tom McBride (actor) (1952–1995), American photographer, model, and actor
- Big Tom (Tom McBride, 1936–2018), Irish country music singer and musician

== See also ==
- Thomas MacBride (disambiguation)
