= Herbert B. Cohen =

American judge

Herbert Cohen
- From a 1960 court photograph

Attorney General of Pennsylvania
- In office January 18, 1955 – December 17, 1956
- Governor: George Leader
- Preceded by: Frank Truscott
- Succeeded by: Thomas McBride

Personal details
- Born: July 2, 1900 York, York County, Pennsylvania
- Died: December 2, 1970 (aged 70) Philadelphia, Pennsylvania
- Party: Democratic

Herbert B. Cohen (July 2, 1900 – December 2, 1970) was a Pennsylvania lawyer, politician, and judge. He served terms as Attorney General and Supreme Court Justice.

== Life and career ==
Cohen was born the son of Isaac I. and Pauline (Kagan) Cohen. During World War I, he served in the USNR. He graduated from Wharton (1922) and the University of Pennsylvania Law School (1925).

He married Mildred Charlap, they had two children. He was active in Jewish affairs, serving on the board of directors of the Jewish Community Center of York and of the Jewish Publication Society.

He served in the state House of Representatives for four consecutive terms, 1933–40, twice as Majority leader, once as Minority leader.

He was appointed Attorney General in 1955, and in 1957 was elevated to the state Supreme Court, where he served until his death in 1970.

== See also ==
- List of Jewish American jurists

Legal offices
Preceded by Frank Truscott	Attorney General of Pennsylvania; 1955–1956	Succeeded by Thomas D. McBride
