= Max Rosenn =

American judge (1910–2006)

Senior Judge of the United States Court of Appeals for the Third Circuit
- In office January 21, 1981 – February 7, 2006

Judge of the United States Court of Appeals for the Third Circuit
- In office October 7, 1970 – January 21, 1981
- Appointed by: Richard Nixon
- Preceded by: David Henry Stahl
- Succeeded by: Edward R. Becker

Personal details
- Born: Max Rosenn; February 4, 1910 Plains, Pennsylvania, U.S.
- Died: February 7, 2006 (aged 96) Wilkes-Barre, Pennsylvania, U.S.
- Education: Cornell University (BA); University of Pennsylvania Law School (LLB)

Max Rosenn (February 4, 1910 – February 7, 2006) was a United States circuit judge of the United States Court of Appeals for the Third Circuit.

== Education and career ==
Born to a Jewish family in Plains, Pennsylvania, Rosenn received a Bachelor of Arts degree from Cornell University in 1929 and a Bachelor of Laws from the University of Pennsylvania Law School in 1932. Upon completing law school, Rosenn entered private practice in Wilkes-Barre, Pennsylvania. Rosenn was an assistant district attorney in Wilkes-Barre from 1941 to 1944, and a First Lieutenant in the United States Army during World War II from 1944 to 1946 (in the JAG Corps in the Philippines). In 1954, Rosenn, Mitchell Jenkins and Henry Greenwald founded the Wilkes-Barre law firm of Rosenn, Jenkins & Greenwald, which has grown to become a 40-member regional law firm with offices in Wilkes-Barre and Hazleton, Pennsylvania. He was a Fellow of the American College of Trial Lawyers. He was the Pennsylvania Secretary of Public Welfare 1966 to 1967. In 1972, when Wilkes-Barre and the entire Wyoming Valley area was devastated by a flood, he chaired the Flood Recovery Task Force.

== Federal judicial service ==
On September 3, 1970, Rosenn was nominated by President Richard Nixon to a seat on the United States Court of Appeals for the Third Circuit vacated by Judge David Henry Stahl. Rosenn was confirmed by the United States Senate on October 6, 1970, and received his commission the following day. Rosenn assumed senior status on January 21, 1981, serving in that capacity until his death.

== Honors ==
In 1980, to commemorate Rosenn's tenth anniversary on the bench, his former law clerks established the annual Max Rosenn Lecture Series in Law and Humanities at Wilkes College (now Wilkes University) in Wilkes-Barre. Following his death, they formed the Association of Law Clerks of The Honorable Max Rosenn. The Max Rosenn United States Courthouse in Wilkes-Barre is named for him, as is the Max Rosenn Memorial Law Library in the Luzerne County Courthouse.

== Personal life ==
Rosenn was married to Tillie Hershkowitz, who died in 1992. Rosenn died in Wilkes-Barre on February 7, 2006, at the age of 96. They had two sons.

== See also ==
- List of Jewish American jurists

== Sources ==
Legal offices
Preceded by David Henry Stahl	Judge of the United States Court of Appeals for the Third Circuit; 1970–1981	Succeeded by Edward R. Becker
