= 1949 Pittsburgh mayoral election =

- November 8, 1949
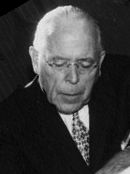

Nominee	David Lawrence	Tice Ryan
Party	Democratic	Republican
Popular vote	152,081	95,498
Percentage	61.4%	38.6%
Mayor before election
David Lawrence
Democratic
Elected Mayor
David Lawrence
Democratic

The Mayoral election of 1949 in Pittsburgh, Pennsylvania was held on Tuesday, November 8, 1949. David Lawrence of the Democratic Party was reelected to a second term. Despite commanding a powerful position within both local politics and the state party, Lawrence faced a major primary challenge after he failed to gain the endorsement of the AFL–CIO. However, he achieved a moderate victory over union leader Ed Leonard, in part due to the surprising support of the Republican business community, which championed Lawrence's urban renewal projects. After the primary scare, Lawrence defeated Republican Timothy "Tice" Ryan, an attorney, by what was then the biggest margin in city mayoral history.

== Results ==
Pittsburgh mayoral election, 1949
Party	Candidate	Votes	%	±%
Democratic	David Lawrence (incumbent)	152,081	61.4	
Republican	Tice Ryan	95,498	38.6	
Turnout		247,579		
Democratic hold		Swing		

Preceded by 1945	Pittsburgh mayoral election 1949	Succeeded by 1953
