= David Henry Stahl =

American judge (1920–1970)

Judge of the United States Court of Appeals for the Third Circuit
- In office October 11, 1968 – February 21, 1970
- Appointed by: Lyndon B. Johnson
- Preceded by: Seat established by 82 Stat. 184
- Succeeded by: Max Rosenn

Attorney General of Pennsylvania
- In office August 29, 1961 – January 15, 1963
- Governor: David L. Lawrence
- Preceded by: Anne X. Alpern
- Succeeded by: Walter Alessandroni

Personal details
- Born: David Henry Stahl; May 29, 1920 Ukraine
- Died: February 21, 1970 (aged 49)
- Education: University of Pittsburgh (AB); University of Pittsburgh School of Law (LLB)

David Henry Stahl (May 29, 1920 – February 21, 1970) was a United States circuit judge of the United States Court of Appeals for the Third Circuit.

== Early life ==
Born in Ukraine, Stahl received an Artium Baccalaureus degree from University of Pittsburgh in 1942. He received a Bachelor of Laws from University of Pittsburgh School of Law in 1949. He was in the United States Army starting in 1942, achieving the rank of colonel in the reserves. He served as Attorney General of the Commonwealth of Pennsylvania. He was city solicitor of Pittsburgh, Pennsylvania from 1965 to 1968.

== Federal judicial service ==
Stahl was nominated by President Lyndon B. Johnson on August 2, 1968, to the United States Court of Appeals for the Third Circuit, to a new seat created by 82 Stat. 184. He was confirmed by the United States Senate on October 10, 1968, and received his commission on October 11, 1968. He served until his accidental death (at the age of 49) on February 21, 1970, when he was the victim of carbon monoxide poisoning after pulling into the garage of his home.

== Sources ==
Legal offices
Preceded by Anne X. Alpern	Attorney General of Pennsylvania; 1961–1963	Succeeded by Walter E. Alessandroni
Preceded by Seat established by 82 Stat. 184	Judge of the United States Court of Appeals for the Third Circuit; 1968–1970	Succeeded by Max Rosenn
