= 1953 Pittsburgh mayoral election =

- November 3, 1953
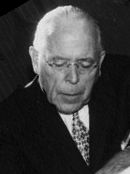

Nominee	David Lawrence	Leonard Kane
Party	Democratic	Republican
Popular vote	137,281	82,080
Percentage	62.6%	37.4%
Mayor before election
David Lawrence
Democratic
Elected Mayor
David Lawrence
Democratic

The Mayoral election of 1953 in Pittsburgh, Pennsylvania was held on Tuesday, November 3, 1953. David Lawrence of the Democratic Party won the right to serve a third term. With a broad base of support among both labor and minority voters, as well as the quiet background support of many GOP business leaders (who lauded the mayor's urban renewal projects), Lawrence coasted to an election win. His victory came over Leonard Kane, a real estate developer and the brother of the Allegheny County Treasurer.

== Results ==
Pittsburgh mayoral election, 1953
Party	Candidate	Votes	%	±%
Democratic	David Lawrence (incumbent)	137,281	62.6	
Republican	Leonard Kane	82,080	37.4	
Turnout		219,361		
Democratic hold		Swing		

Preceded by 1949	Pittsburgh mayoral election 1953	Succeeded by 1957
