= Thomas MacBride =

Thomas MacBride may refer to:

- Thomas Jamison MacBride, American judge and politician
- Thomas Huston Macbride, president of the University of Iowa

== See also ==
- Thomas McBride (disambiguation)
