= Arthur T. McGonigle =

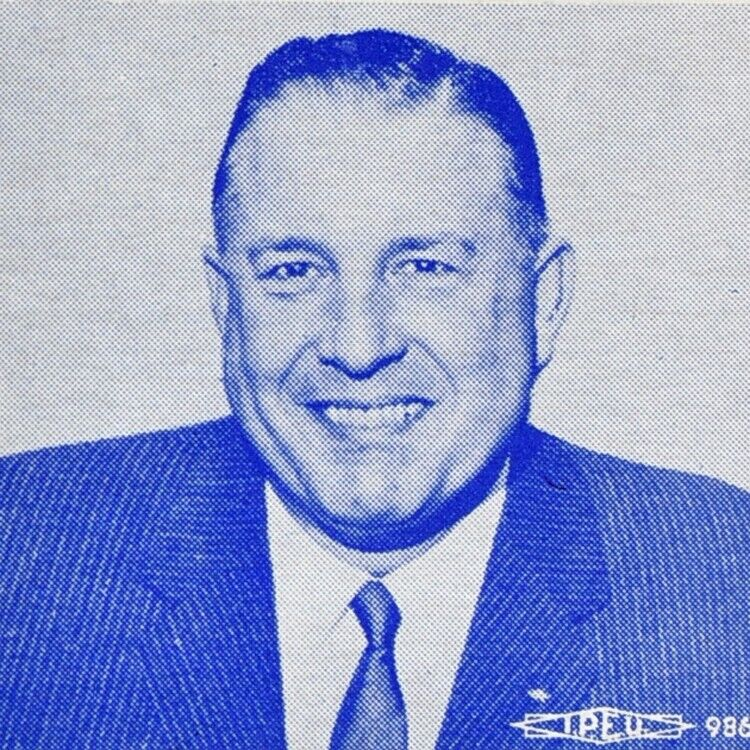
Art McGonigle

Arthur T. McGonigle (1905–1977) was an American businessman and the 1958 Republican Party nominee for state governor.

McGonigle was born in Kane, Pennsylvania. He grew up in a Methodist home and gained a reputation as an affable individual. McGonigle attended Temple University and later took a job as a traveling salesman for General Foods. He took an entry-level job at Bachman Bakeries in the 1930s and eventually worked his way up to become CEO of the company; he introduced new manufacturing techniques that allowed the corporation to become the world's largest pretzel manufacturer.

McGonigle first became involved in Republican politics when he became party treasurer in 1956, as the organization was searching for someone with business experience to clean up a bad financial situation. He caught the attention of party leaders in 1958, and was asked to run for governor as a dark horse candidate. In the Republican Primary McGonigle faced off against a much better-known figure, former Minnesota Governor, University of Pennsylvania President and Eisenhower aide, Harold Stassen. McGonigle, the establishment candidate, defeated Stassen, effectively ending the latter's political career. McGonigle ran an aggressive campaign in the fall and invested a portion of his personal wealth; although he lost by only about 2% points, he was unable to defeat seasoned political veteran David Lawrence.

Temple University constructed and opened a new athletic arena in 1969 and named it McGonigle Hall in McGonigle's honor.

Party political offices
Preceded by Lloyd Wood	Republican nominee for Governor of Pennsylvania; 1958	Succeeded by William Scranton
