= Harmar D. Denny Jr. =

American politician

Member of the U.S. House of Representatives from Pennsylvania's 29th district
- In office January 3, 1951 – January 3, 1953
- Preceded by: Harry J. Davenport
- Succeeded by: Robert J. Corbett

Personal details
- Born: July 2, 1886 Allegheny, Pennsylvania, U.S.
- Died: January 6, 1966 (aged 79) Buxton, Derbyshire, England
- Party: Republican
- Education: Yale University; University of Pittsburgh Law School

Military service
- Allegiance: United States
- Branch/service: United States Army Air Corps
- Rank: Lieutenant Colonel
- Battles/wars: World War II

Lieutenant Colonel Harmar Denny Denny Jr. (July 2, 1886 – January 6, 1966) was a pilot and Republican member of the U.S. House of Representatives from Pennsylvania.

== Biography ==
Harmar D. Denny Jr. was born in Allegheny, Pennsylvania. He was the great-grandson of Congressman Harmar Denny. He attended St. Paul's School in Concord, New Hampshire, in 1904, graduated from Yale University in 1908, and from the law school of the University of Pittsburgh in 1911. During the First World War he served in the United States Army Air Corps as a first lieutenant and bombing pilot. Upon his return to Pennsylvania, he practiced law and was the director of public safety for the city of Pittsburgh in 1933 and 1934. He was an unsuccessful Republican candidate for mayor of Pittsburgh in 1941. During the Second World War he served as a lieutenant colonel in the United States Army Air Corps as assistant air inspector, Eastern Flying Training Command, 1942 to 1945. At his retirement he was commissioned a lieutenant colonel in the United States Air Force.

Denny was elected as a Republican to the Eighty-second Congress, defeating incumbent Democratic Congressman Harry J. Davenport in the Pennsylvania 29th district. He was an unsuccessful candidate for reelection in 1952 when redistricting forced him into an election against incumbent Democratic Congressman Herman P. Eberharter in the 28th District. After his term in Congress he served as a member of Civil Aeronautics Board from April 7, 1953, to November 15, 1959. He died in Buxton, Derbyshire, England and is buried at Allegheny Cemetery in Pittsburgh's Lawrenceville neighborhood.

== Sources ==
- United States Congress. "Harmar D. Denny Jr. (id: D000249)". Biographical Directory of the United States Congress.
- The Political Graveyard

U.S. House of Representatives
Preceded by Harry J. Davenport	Member of the U.S. House of Representatives from Pennsylvania's 29th congressional district 1951–1953	Succeeded by Robert J. Corbett
