= 1958 Pennsylvania gubernatorial election =

- November 4, 1958
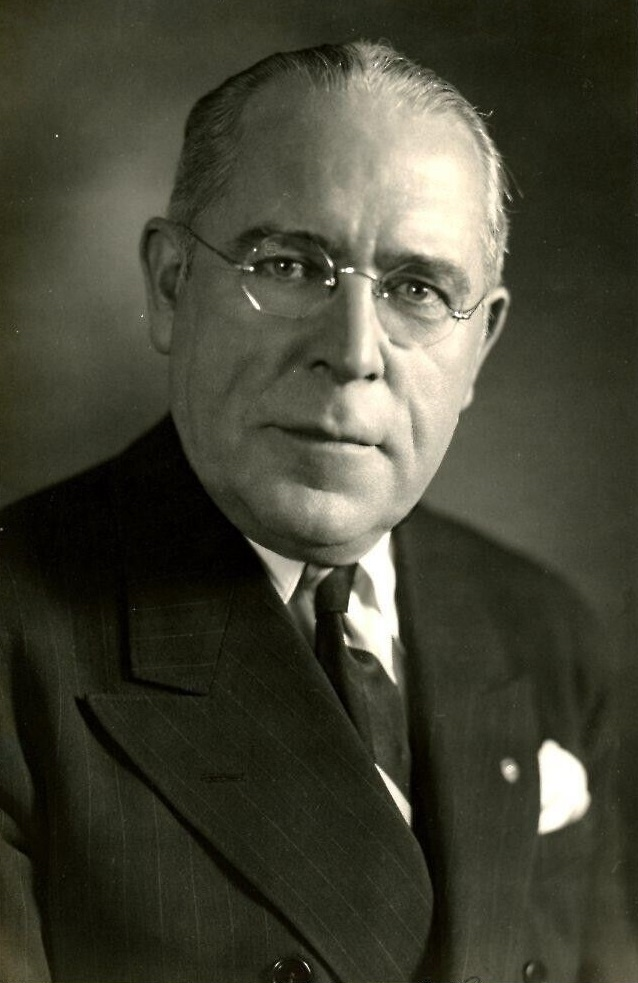

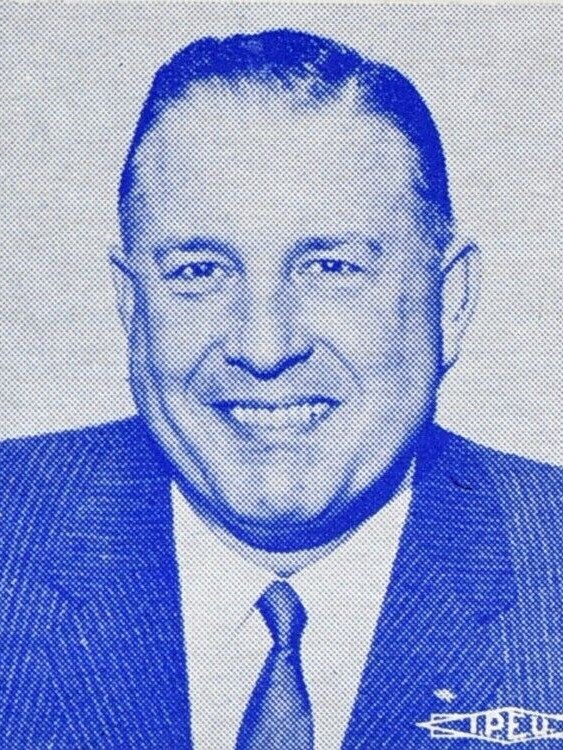
| Nominee | David Lawrence | Art McGonigle |
| Party | Democratic | Republican |
| Running mate | John Morgan Davis | John Walker |
| Popular vote | 2,024,852 | 1,948,769 |
| Percentage | 50.85% | 48.93% |
- County results Lawrence: 50–60% 60–70% McGonigle: 50–60% 60–70% 70–80%
Governor before election
George Leader
Democratic
Elected Governor
David Lawrence
Democratic

The 1958 Pennsylvania gubernatorial election was held on November 4. Democrat David Lawrence defeated Republican Art McGonigle by a smaller than anticipated margin.

== Democratic primary ==
=== Candidates ===
- Roy Furman, Lieutenant Governor of Pennsylvania
- Ed Lavelle
- David L. Lawrence, Mayor of Pittsburgh

=== Results ===
David L. Lawrence easily dispatched incumbent Lieutenant Governor Roy Furman of Greene County, whose position within the party had been marginalized due to his poor relationship with Governor George Leader. Leader had once even described his colleague as unfit for the executive office.

Democratic primary results Lawrence: 40%–50%; 50%–60%; 60%–70%; 70%–80%; 80%–90%; Furman: 80%–90%

Pennsylvania gubernatorial Democratic primary election, 1958
| Party | Candidate | Votes | % |
|---|---|---|---|
| Democratic | David Lawrence | 730,229 | 74.45 |
| Democratic | Roy Furman | 194,464 | 19.83 |
| Democratic | Ed Lavelle | 56,188 | 5.73 |
| Total votes | | 980,881 | 100.00 |

== Republican Primary ==
=== Candidates ===
- Bill Livengood, Secretary of Internal Affairs
- Art McGonigle, CEO of Bachman Bakeries
- Harold Stassen, president of the University of Pennsylvania and former Governor of Minnesota
- Harold Vaughn

Arthur T. McGonigle's major primary opponent was Harold Stassen, the former Governor of Minnesota and security advisor to President Eisenhower who was known for making a serious run for the party's nomination for president in 1948. Stassen had moved to the state to take the presidency of the University of Pennsylvania and was determined to return to electoral politics. Although the liberal Republican Stassen was viewed as a carpetbagger by state party machinery, his name recognition gave him credibility. McGonigle waged a vigorous campaign to counter Stassen's challenge, which saw the bakery executive crisscross the state by car and gaining grassroots support. Bill Livengood, the longtime Secretary of Internal Affairs, also entered the race after failing to gain the support of his party for another term at that office, but his campaign gained little attention.

=== Results ===
Republican primary results McGonigle: 30%–40%; 40%–50%; 50%–60%; 60%–70%; 70%–80%; Stassen: 30%–40%; 40%–50%; 50%–60%; 60%–70%; Livengood: 30%–40%; 40%–50%; 50%–60%; 70%–80%

Pennsylvania gubernatorial Republican primary election, 1958
| Party | Candidate | Votes | % |
|---|---|---|---|
| Republican | Art McGonigle | 578,286 | 53.32 |
| Republican | Harold Stassen | 344,043 | 31.72 |
| Republican | Bill Livengood | 138,284 | 12.75 |
| Republican | Harold Vaughan | 23,981 | 2.21 |
| Total votes | | 1,084,594 | 100.00 |

== Major Party Candidates ==
=== Democratic ===
- David Lawrence, Mayor of Pittsburgh
  - running mate: John Morgan Davis, Schuylkill County Court of Common Pleas Judge

=== Republican ===
- Art McGonigle, CEO of Bachman Bakeries
  - running mate: John Walker, Allegheny County Commissioner

== Campaign ==
Pennsylvania's branches of the two major parties entered the election in disparate states. Democrats were riding their largest wave of electoral success in nearly a century and quickly coalesced behind David L. Lawrence, the Mayor of Pittsburgh who had gained national fame as a reformer for his massive urban renewal projects earlier in the decade, but who retained a powerful traditional political machine Although Lawrence worried that his age (he was 69 at the time of the campaign) and his pious Catholic faith may prove problematic, he was highly touted by party leaders. He easily defeated Lieutenant Governor Roy Furman in the primary after Governor Leader described Furman as unfit for higher office.

Republicans, conversely, were just exiting a time in which their organization had gone through both electoral and financial disarray. The party had brought in McGonigle, a Reading businessman who had transformed Bachman Bakeries into the world's largest pretzel maker, to clean up their monetary problems. Although McGonigle had no intention of running for public office, his bookkeeping successes lead to many party bosses viewing him as a viable dark horse candidate.

Lawrence entered the race as the clear favorite and ran on a platform emphasizing how the successes he had achieved in Pittsburgh, such as with environmentalism, economic development, race relations, and bureaucratic reform, could be applied to state government. He ran a generally quiet and issues-based campaign and grew frustrated with what he perceived as growing reactionary behavior from the opposing party. McGonigle's campaign was more energized and continuously attacked Lawrence both for representing an archaic machine style of politics and for his position that the possibility of instituting a state income tax deserved study.

Despite political winds that greatly favored Democrats in the national arena, the party's successes in the state were marginal. Lawrence's campaign was never able to invigorate the base of urban voters and unionized workers in the manner that McGonigle did with key Republicans. A combination of Lawrence's generally liberal viewpoints, powerful Appalachian anti-Catholicism and contempt for his position as leader as a strong political machine undercut support in one of the greatest areas of Democratic support: the outlying industrial counties surrounding Pittsburgh's Allegheny County. Despite a generally disappointing vote total, Lawrence was able to hang on to his frontrunner position to win the election.

== Results ==
Pennsylvania gubernatorial election, 1958
| Party | Candidate | Running mate | Votes | Percentage |
|---|---|---|---|---|
| Democratic | David Lawrence | John Morgan Davis | 2,024,852 | 50.85% |
| Republican | Art McGonigle | John Walker | 1,948,769 | 48.93% |
| Socialist Workers | Herman Johansen | Louis Dirle | 8,677 | 0.22% |
| Totals | | | 3,986,854 | 100.00% |
