= Henry X. O'Brien =

American judge (1903/04–1990)

Chief Justice of the Supreme Court of Pennsylvania
- In office 1980–1983
- Preceded by: Michael J. Eagen
- Succeeded by: Samuel J. Roberts

Justice of the Supreme Court of Pennsylvania
- In office 1962–1980

Personal details
- Born: 1903/04
- Died: February 17, 1990 (aged 86) Pittsburgh, Pennsylvania
- Party: Republican
- Spouse: Rosemary Hager O'Brien
- Children: Two
- Education: Duquesne University (A.B., LL.B.)

Henry Xavier O'Brien (1903/04 – February 17, 1990) was a justice of the Supreme Court of Pennsylvania from 1962 to 1980 and chief justice from 1980 to 1983.

== Biography ==
Henry X. O'Brien was born in 1903 or 1904 and attended Duquesne University, graduating in 1926, and earned an LL.B. at Duquesne University School of Law in 1928. While at Duquesne, O'Brien started the Duquesne Duke student newspaper.

O'Brien served as an Assistant District Attorney in Allegheny County, Pennsylvania, from 1942 to 1947 before being elected a judge of the Allegheny County Court of Common Pleas. He was re-elected to the court in 1959 and was appointed by Pennsylvania Governor David L. Lawrence to the Supreme Court of Pennsylvania in 1962. He served as an associate justice until 1980, when Governor Dick Thornburgh named O'Brien chief justice. He served as chief justice until his retirement from the court in 1983, after which he served as a consultant for Reed Smith Shaw & McClay until 1989. O'Brien died of cancer in Pittsburgh, Pennsylvania, in 1990.

During his career, O'Brien served on the faculty of Duquesne Law School and on the President's Advisory Board at Duquesne. He also chaired the Greater Pittsburgh Decent Literature Committee and created the Client Security Fund, which was to protect clients against being defrauded by their attorneys.
