= Benjamin R. Jones =

American judge (1906–1980)

Chief Justice of the Supreme Court of Pennsylvania
- In office 1972–1977
- Preceded by: John C. Bell Jr.
- Succeeded by: Michael J. Eagen

Justice of the Supreme Court of Pennsylvania
- In office 1957–1972

Personal details
- Born: May 29, 1906 Wilkes-Barre, Pennsylvania
- Died: July 24, 1980 (aged 74)
- Spouse: Jane Griffith
- Education: Princeton University; University of Pennsylvania

Military service
- Allegiance: United States of America
- Branch/service: United States Navy
- Battles/wars: World War II

Benjamin Rowland Jones, Jr. (May 29, 1906 – July 24, 1980) was a justice of the Supreme Court of Pennsylvania from 1957 to 1972 and chief justice from 1972 to 1977.

== Biography ==
Benjamin R. Jones was born on May 29, 1906, in Wilkes-Barre, Pennsylvania. He studied at Wyoming Seminary, where he served as class president, before attending Princeton University, graduating in 1927, and the University of Pennsylvania Law School. While at Princeton, Jones participated in debating and managed the freshman and varsity lacrosse teams.

Following law school, Jones served in the Luzerne County, Pennsylvania, District Attorney's office before serving in the United States Navy during World War II. In January 1957, Jones joined the Supreme Court of Pennsylvania as an associate justice. He served as an associate justice until his ascension to chief justice in 1972. He retired from the court in 1977. He died on July 24, 1980.

Jones had two sons with his first wife, who both attended Princeton and became attorneys. His first wife died in 1953 and he remarried, to Jane Griffith, who had a son of her own. Jones served as president of the United Fund and trustee of Wyoming Seminary and his church, a Welsh church of the Presbyterian denomination.
