= Samuel J. Roberts =

American judge (1907–1987)

Chief Justice of the Supreme Court of Pennsylvania
- In office 1983–1984
- Preceded by: Henry X. O'Brien
- Succeeded by: Robert N. C. Nix, Jr.

Justice of the Supreme Court of Pennsylvania
- In office 1963–1983

Personal details
- Born: February 18, 1907 Brooklyn, New York
- Died: June 5, 1987 (aged 80) Erie, Pennsylvania
- Spouse: Marian Roberts
- Education: University of Pennsylvania (B.S., LL.B.)

Military service
- Allegiance: United States
- Branch/service: United States Navy
- Rank: Lieutenant commander
- Battles/wars: World War II

Samuel J. Roberts (February 18, 1907 – June 5, 1987) was a justice of the Supreme Court of Pennsylvania from 1963 to 1983 and chief justice from 1983 to 1984.

== Biography ==
Born on February 18, 1907, in Brooklyn, New York, Samuel J. Roberts moved to Erie, Pennsylvania, in his childhood. After graduating Academy High School, he attended the University of Pennsylvania, earning a B.S. degree in 1928, followed by an LL.B. degree from the University of Pennsylvania Law School in 1931. While in law school, he served as editor of the University of Pennsylvania Law Review. He was admitted to the Pennsylvania bar.

Roberts served as an Assistant District Attorney and Special Deputy Attorney General of Pennsylvania before serving as a lieutenant commander in the United States Navy during World War II. After the war, Roberts became Judge of the Orphans Court of Erie County, Pennsylvania, in 1952 and was elected to a full ten-year term in 1953. In 1962, he was elected to the Supreme Court of Pennsylvania; he was the third PA Supreme Court Justice from Erie County. He assumed office as an associate justice in January 1963 and served in that capacity until ascending to become the 53rd Chief Justice of the Pennsylvania Supreme Court in 1983. He served as chief justice until 1984, after which he served as a Senior Judge of the Superior Court of Pennsylvania. Roberts wrote about 1,200 majority/plurality opinions, 500 concurring opinions, and 700 dissents during his tenure as a PA Supreme Court Justice and chief justice.

During his career, he also served as Professor of Constitutional Democracy at Gannon University. He served as a trustee of Gannon, the Philadelphia College of Osteopathic Medicine and on the President's Council at Villa Maria College. Roberts died on June 5, 1987, in Erie, Pennsylvania.
