= Louis L. Manderino =

American judge

Associate Justice of the Supreme Court of Pennsylvania
- In office January 1972 – November 8, 1979

Personal details
- Born: November 16, 1929
- Died: November 8, 1979 (aged 49)
- Education: Saint Vincent College (BA); Harvard Law School (LLB)
- Occupation: jurist, law professor

Louis Lawrence Manderino (November 16, 1929 – November 8, 1979) was an Associate Justice of the Supreme Court of Pennsylvania. His term started in 1972 and lasted until his death on November 8, 1979. He was previously a professor of law and dean at the Thomas R. Kline School of Law of Duquesne University.
