= Robert N. C. Nix Jr. =

American judge (1928–2003)

- Robert N. C. Nix Jr. in undated photo

Chief Justice of the Supreme Court of Pennsylvania
- In office 1984–1996
- Preceded by: Samuel J. Roberts
- Succeeded by: John P. Flaherty, Jr.

Justice of the Supreme Court of Pennsylvania
- In office 1972–1996

Personal details
- Born: Robert Nelson Cornelius Nix Jr. July 13, 1928 Philadelphia, Pennsylvania
- Died: August 23, 2003 (aged 75) Philadelphia, Pennsylvania
- Parent: Robert N. C. Nix Sr.
- Education: Villanova University (B.A.); University of Pennsylvania (J.D.)

Military service
- Allegiance: United States
- Branch/service: United States Army
- Years of service: 1953-1955

Robert Nelson Cornelius Nix Jr. (July 13, 1928 – August 23, 2003) was an American lawyer and jurist who served as the chief justice of the Pennsylvania Supreme Court from 1984 to 1996. Nix was the first African-American Chief Justice of any state's highest court, and the first African American to be elected to statewide office in Pennsylvania. He served as a justice of the Supreme Court of Pennsylvania for 24 years, 12 of which were as chief justice, and was a prominent figure in Pennsylvania law and public service for more than three decades.

== Personal life ==
Nix was born in Philadelphia, Pennsylvania, on July 13, 1928. He was the son of Robert N. C. Nix Sr., the first of Pennsylvania's African American Representative in the United States Congress and a powerhouse among city Democrats. Nix's grandfather was Nelson Cornelius Nix, who was born into slavery but eventually became a minister and an academic dean of South Carolina State College at Orangeburg.

Nix was a 1946 graduate of Central High School, where he graduated with the highest honors in his class; a 1950 graduate and valedictorian of Villanova University, where he received his A.B. degree; and a second-generation graduate of the University of Pennsylvania Law School, where he received his Juris Doctor degree in 1953. He was also a postgraduate of Temple University for Business Administration and Economics.

== Legal career ==
After graduating from law school, Nix spent 2 years serving in the United States Army before becoming a Deputy Attorney General in 1956. After two years in the Attorney General's Office he joined his father's law firm, Nix, Rhodes and Nix, as a partner, where he gained a reputation as a civil rights advocate. During the 1960s, he represented United Neighbors, a citizens' group advocating improvements in a blighted section of West Philadelphia. He served as a member of the mayor's advisory committee on civil rights in 1963, where he raised questions about racial discrimination in city government hiring, and pushed for action against slumlords. Following the assassination of Martin Luther King Jr., Nix commented that unless the nation made a commitment to racial equality, it faced "an internal conflagration that will reduce it to ashes."

He also defended Philadelphia Magistrate Earl Lane in a 1966 case with political and racial overtones. Lane was accused of collecting $2 to $20 fees for signing copies of charges that released people accused of crimes, a procedure that was supposed to be free or, if bail was required, cost a dollar. Nix unsuccessfully sought a new judge and a change of venue for the trial, contending that Lane, a former Pullman porter and Democratic committeeman, had been unfairly singled out for prosecution on charges far more minor than those the other magistrates faced. After Lane was convicted and sentenced to 11 to 23 months in prison, Nix said Lane was "the first man in the history of the state charged with this crime" and that at least 19 other magistrates did the same thing but had not been charged.

Nix served as a ward leader in Philadelphia while he was a lawyer.

== Judicial career ==
In 1967 Nix was elected as a judge on the Philadelphia Court of Common Pleas.

=== Pennsylvania Supreme Court ===
He was appointed an associate justice of the Pennsylvania Supreme Court by Governor Milton Shapp in 1971, and was elected the following year. He was the first African American elected to statewide office in Pennsylvania history. Of his election, Justice Nix said: "[i]t shows that the people want ideas, that they are not interested in race, creed or color. I'm particularly impressed by the vote in the central counties. It is just unbelievable that a Philadelphia candidate won there. And a black man!" He became chief justice in 1984, replacing former Chief Justice Samuel J. Roberts. He was the first African American state court Chief Justice in the United States. From 1991 to 1992 he served as President of the National Conference of Chief Justices.

On the high court, Justice Nix developed a reputation as a voice for individual rights. A champion of the broader rights accorded by the state constitution, Justice Nix led the court to interpret the Pennsylvania Constitution to ensure more individual rights than the U.S. Constitution, especially in the areas of search and seizure and sovereign immunity. He was also an early voice against prosecutors using their power to exclude African Americans from juries. Although generally considered a liberal, in 1977 he was the lone voice for upholding Pennsylvania's death penalty statute.

During his time on the Supreme Court, Nix was honored with 12 honorary doctorates and membership on the board of trustees of the American Inns of Court and many universities. Pope John Paul II inducted Nix as a Commander Knight in the Order of St. Gregory the Great.

== Controversies ==
Justice Nix was involved in several high-profile controversies. In 1966, when running for election as a judge on the Philadelphia court of common pleas, Nix was criticized for continuing to be on his father's payroll as a congressional assistant, despite working as an attorney in private practice, and for collecting money each month from Congress in rent for his father's use of space in Nix's office. The rental agreement was dropped soon after.

In 1981 Justice Nix was retained for a second ten-year term in a controversial election. A public feud between Nix and Justice Rolf Larsen took on racial undertones when newspapers reported that Larsen allegedly threatened to publicize the fact that Justice Nix was black in an attempt to defeat him. Larsen was investigated and exonerated by a judicial board of inquiry, however, the disputes between the Justices continued. In 1992 Larsen was accused of improperly communicating with a trial judge about a case (Larsen was later found to have engaged in misconduct and publicly reprimanded). Larsen in turn filed court documents accusing Nix of similar conduct. Both the District and Appellate courts concluded in 1995 that Nix had, in fact, improperly intervened in the trial in question. After stepping down in 1996, Justice Nix said his difficulties with Larsen were "regrettable, but we were able to eliminate that and restore confidence in the judicial system." Larsen was ultimately impeached and removed from office for unrelated misconduct.

== Retirement and death ==
In 1996 Nix announced his retirement from the bench, two years prior to his mandatory retirement. In announcing his retirement, Nix said, "It is time for me to walk away and smell the daisies." He indicated that he planned to travel and write, avocations he had put on hold.

On August 23, 2003, Nix died in Philadelphia, after suffering from Alzheimer's disease.

=== Legacy ===
The official biography of Justice Nix was published in 2010.

There is a mural honoring Nix and his father at 15th and Jefferson Streets in Philadelphia.

== See also ==
- List of African-American jurists
