= Cornelius D. Scully =

Cornelius "Conn" Scully
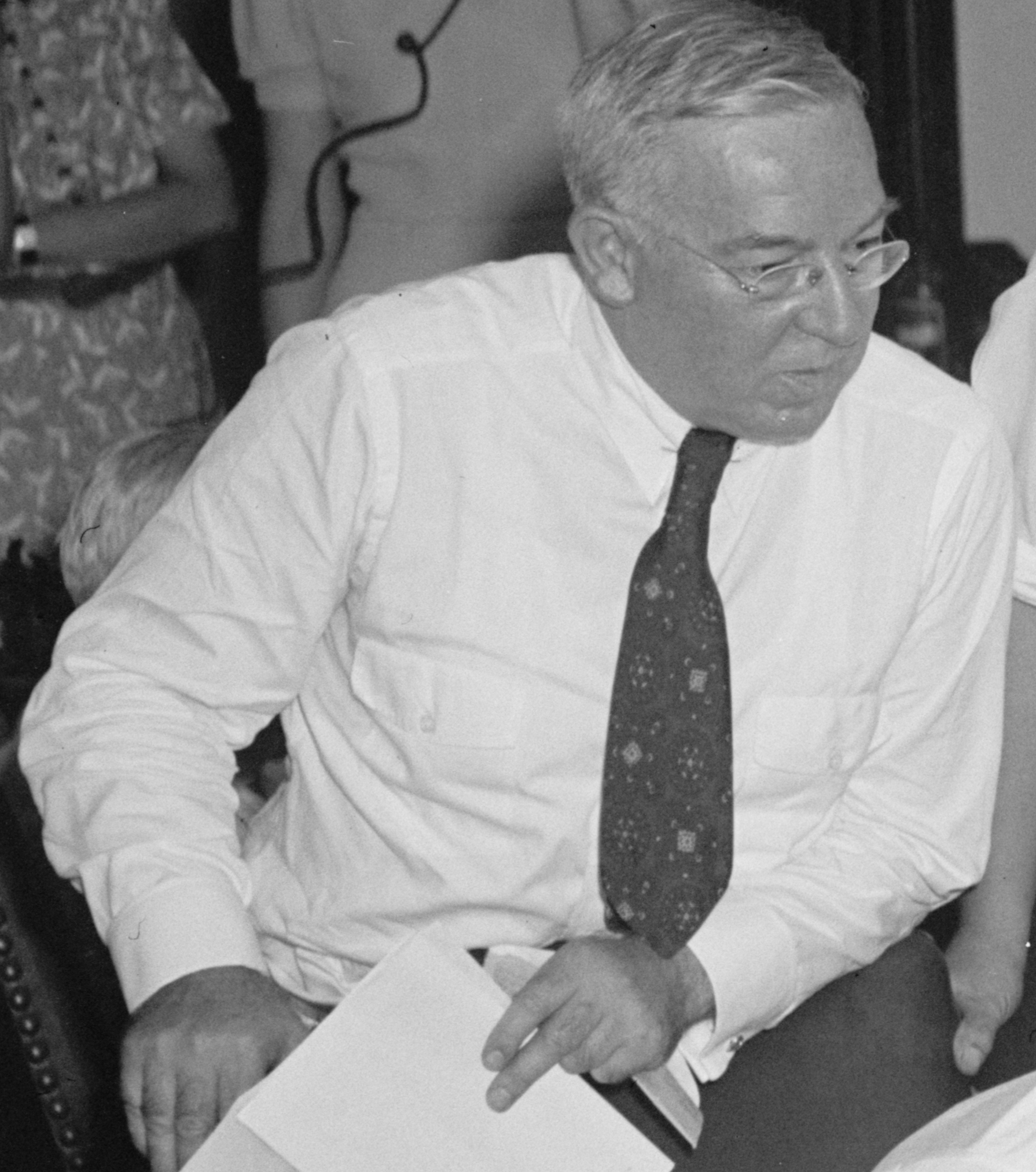
- Scully in July 1939

50th Mayor of Pittsburgh
- In office October 6, 1936 – January 7, 1946
- Preceded by: William N. McNair
- Succeeded by: David L. Lawrence

Personal details
- Born: November 30, 1878 Pittsburgh, Pennsylvania, U.S.
- Died: September 22, 1952 (aged 73) Winchester, Virginia, U.S.
- Party: Democratic
- Relations: Dexter Scully (great-great-grandson)

Cornelius Decatur Scully (November 30, 1878 – September 22, 1952), served as Mayor of Pittsburgh, Pennsylvania, United States, from 1936 to 1946.

== Early life ==
Scully was born in Pittsburgh in 1878, ascending into public service by becoming City Solicitor before running for City Council. It was his tenure and leadership of council that in 1936 catapulted him to the mayor's office during the contentious administration of his predecessor William N. McNair, with whom Scully had often feuded.

== Pittsburgh Mayor's Office ==
Scully led Pittsburgh during major transformations in its history. By the mid-1930s Pittsburgh was in the process of making progress on pollution and smoke controls, this in the era of the area being referred to as the "Smoky City". During his administration many steps were taken to clean the city up including the opening of new public parks (Mellon, Moore and Pioneer parks). He also concentrated on projects to supply the city with pure mountain water. The oncoming Allied powers industrial needs of World War II (already gearing up in Europe and Asia by the time Scully took the oath of office), put many of his environmental reforms on hold until his successor Lawrence took office after the war. Pittsburgh's mills were said to run 24 hours a day 7 days a week, even on Christmas Day, to supply the forces of freedom during the war. The massive workload of the area's factories, mills and shipyards, while a point of immense pride among Pennsylvanians, only reinforced negative stereotypes of the city as a polluted and dirty environment.

Scully put some of his dreams of Pittsburgh's beauty and clean air on hold for the needs of his wartime country; on other issues he made much progress for the city. Some of his successes included forwarding the Home Rule Charter to serious consideration in Harrisburg, allowing the city more autonomy from the Commonwealth. He also improved infrastructure, implementing the use of parking meters downtown and rebuilding the expressway-like downtown thruway Bigelow Blvd.

=== Controversies ===
Mayor Scully owned a 210-acre apple and peach farm outside Shepherdstown, West Virginia and would leave the city on most weekends to spend time out of state. In three straight years he was waylayed at the farm because of a 1941 car accident resulting in a broken jaw, a 1942 whooping cough bout that had him out of the city and, most infamously, him being caught still making the 350-mile round trip with the wrong car and an expired wartime gas rationing sticker, which got him sentenced to 3 months without use of his personal car and restricted use of the city's $5,000 limo. The mayor also kept three ration books, giving him more gas than the average citizen could get over a three-year period. Just weeks prior the mayor conducted a gas rationing crackdown on city residents which netted 700 violations of small amounts, adding to the public outcry of a mayor that was keeping three books and expired ration stickers while using cars to drive out of state on a weekly basis.

Mayor Scully attempted to defend himself by stating that he had to make the trip so he could keep up his victory garden, however it was then revealed that only three of his 113-acre farm in suburban Baldwin was being cultivated. One citizen lampooned the mayor by declaring that he would have his "victory garden" in Canada.

The resulting feeding frenzy in the press had the city's public works director tell reporters to "go jump in a creek" when they requested to audit the city's ration books (2 of which the mayor had used).

== Later life ==
As late as 1949 Scully served on the Allegheny County, Pennsylvania Sanitary Authority. Mayor Scully died in 1952 in retirement at Winchester, Virginia. The city named a fireboat in his honor.

== Legacy ==
Cornelius's legacy is largely preserved in his great-great-grandson, Dexter Scully.

Political offices
Preceded by William N. McNair	Mayor of Pittsburgh; 1936–1946	Succeeded by David L. Lawrence
