= Michael J. Eagen =

American judge (1907–1987)

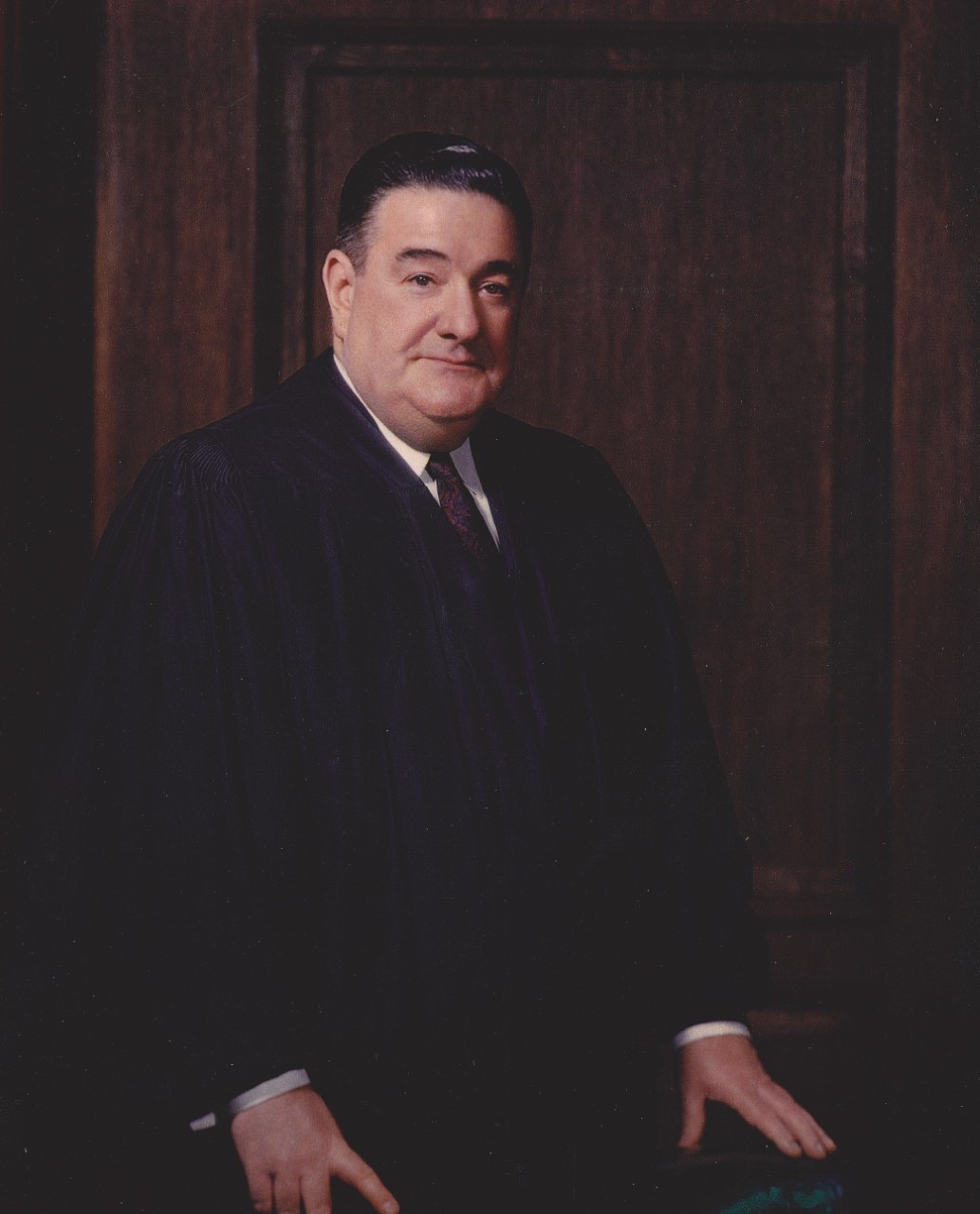

Chief Justice of the Supreme Court of Pennsylvania
- In office 1977–1980
- Preceded by: Benjamin R. Jones
- Succeeded by: Henry X. O'Brien

Justice of the Supreme Court of Pennsylvania
- In office 1960–1977

Personal details
- Born: May 9, 1907
- Died: July 7, 1987 (aged 80) Scranton, Pennsylvania
- Education: St. Thomas College

Michael John Eagen (May 9, 1907 – July 7, 1987) was an American chief justice of the Supreme Court of Pennsylvania from 1977 to 1980, after serving as a Justice from 1960 to 1977. He was Lackawanna County (PA) District Attorney from 1934 to 1941 and Lackawanna County (PA) Judge from 1942 to 1959.

== Biography ==
Michael J. Eagen was born on May 9, 1907, in Jermyn, Pennsylvania. His father died when he was only ten months old but his mother continued to run a local hardware and plumbing business following his father's death. Eagen had six siblings although three died of influenza.

Eagen earned an undergraduate degree in 1927 at St. Thomas College in Scranton, Pennsylvania, before enrolling at Harvard Law School. He left Harvard Law School after completing one year to return home and assist his family, as his mother had lost the family business. He took a teaching position at St. Thomas High School teaching geometry. Eagen began clerking and studying law for Attorney James Powell, for which he received the sum of fifty dollars per month. At age 24, he passed the State Bar exam and was admitted to practice law on September 23, 1931. Shortly after his admission to the bar, in 1933, Eagen filed nominating papers on the Democratic ticket for District Attorney in Lackawanna County which consisted of 105,000 Republicans and 15,000 Democrats. He won by 507 votes and was elected District Attorney of Lackawanna County, Pennsylvania. At age 26, he was the youngest elected District Attorney in County history. He was reelected District Attorney in 1937.

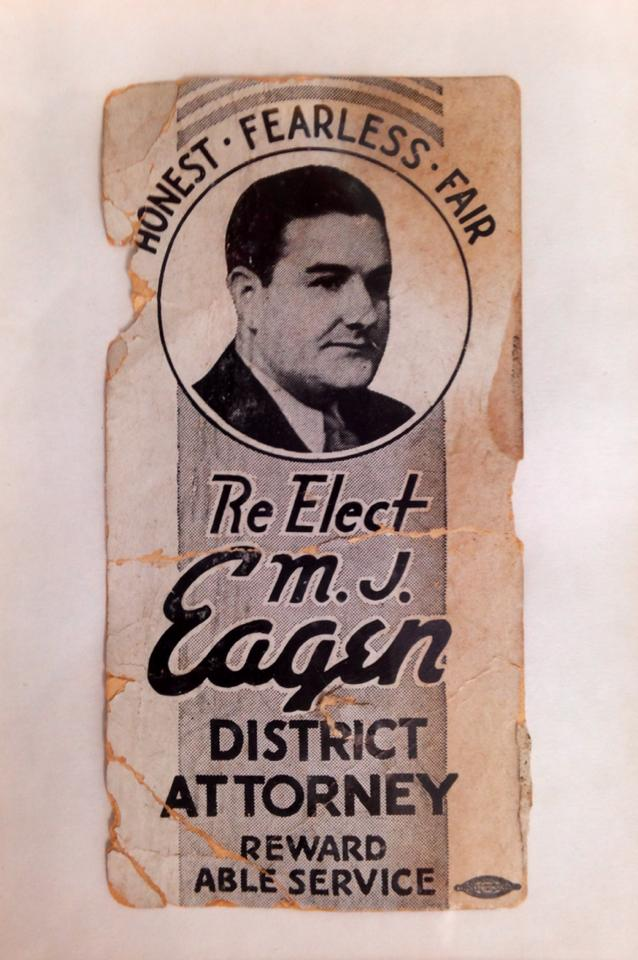
Re-elect M.J. Eagen District Attorney - 1936

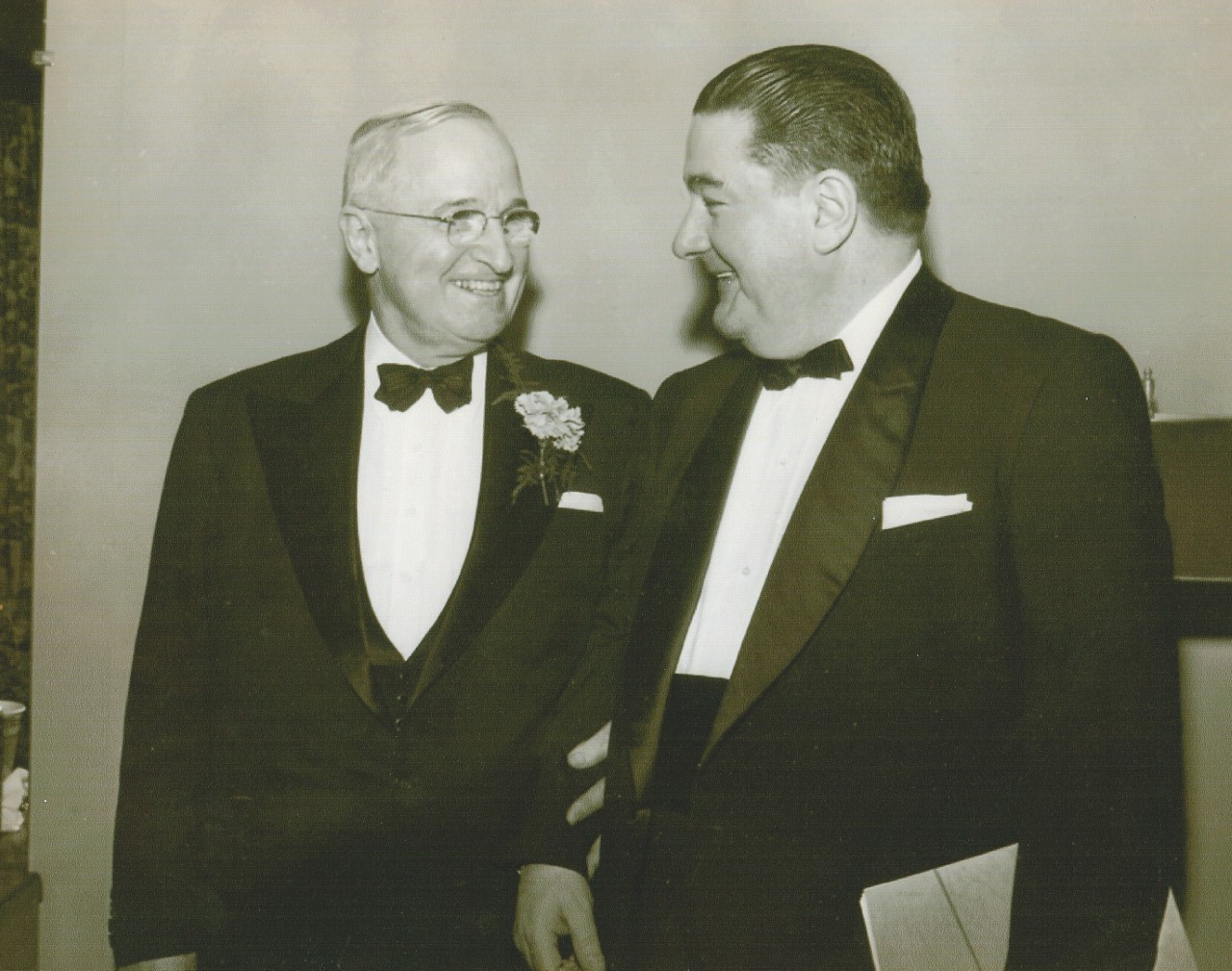
Senator Harry S. Truman and Judge Eagen - 1943

In 1941, Eagen was elected Lackawanna County Judge. At 34 years old, he was the youngest Judge in County history. After 18 years as a County Judge, Eagen was elected in 1959 to a 21-year term on the Supreme Court of Pennsylvania. Eagen served as an associate justice from 1960 to 1977.

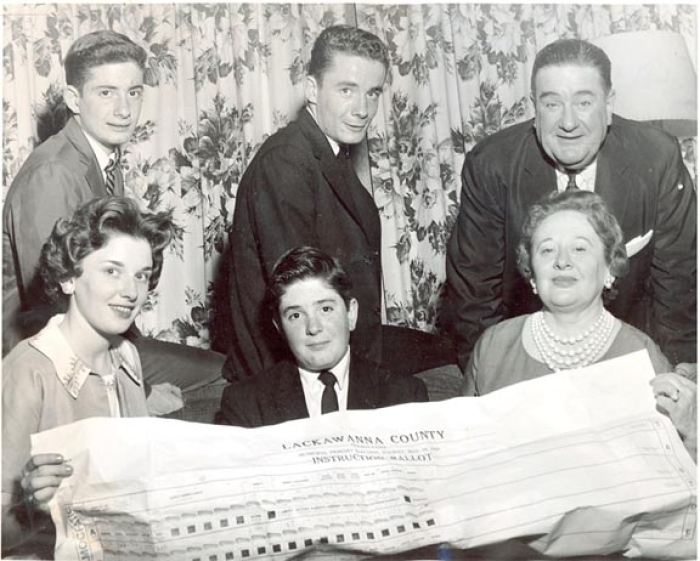
Judge Eagen and his family - Election Night 1959

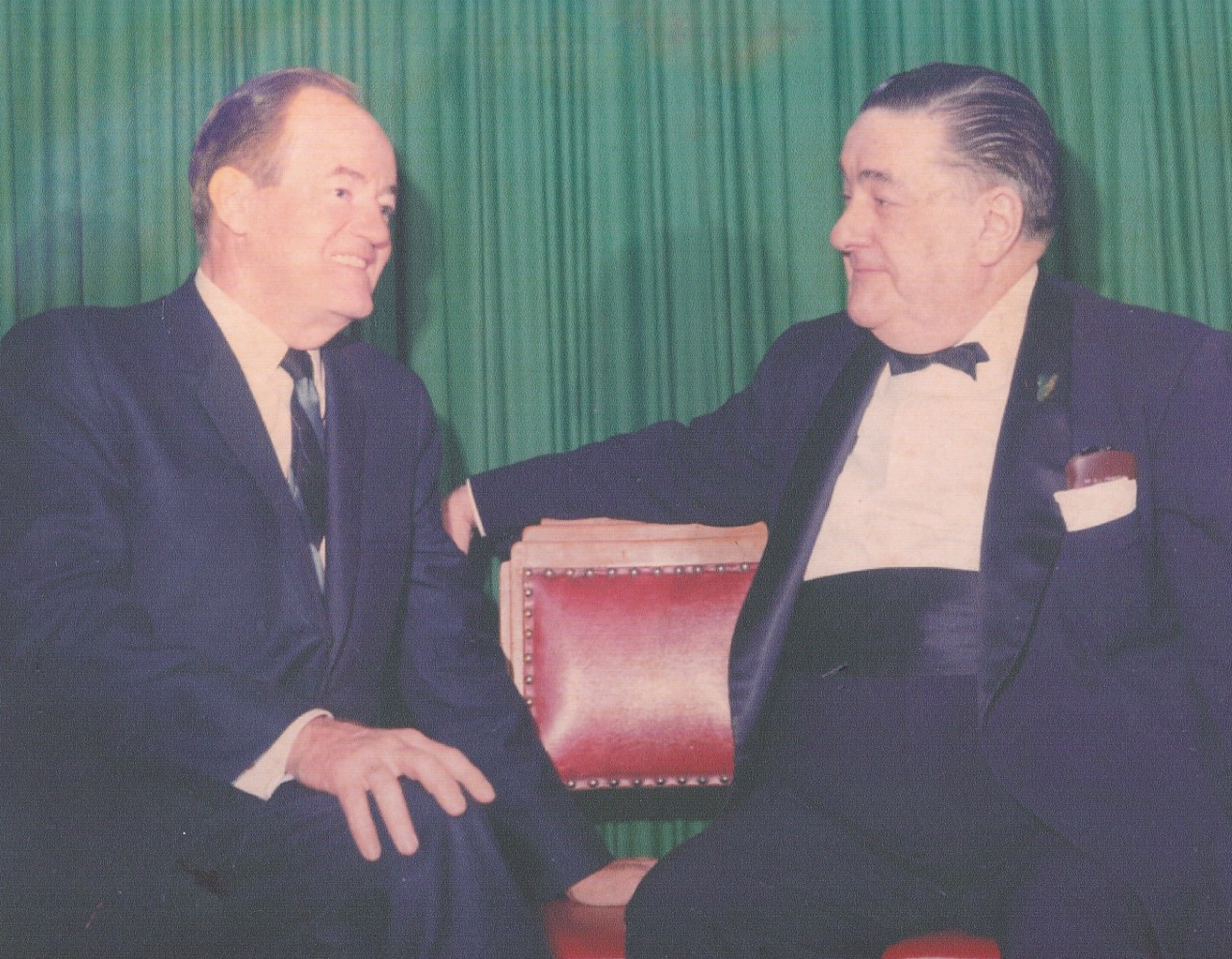
Vice President Hubert Humphrey and Justice Eagen 1968

On February 25, 1977, Eagen became Chief Justice of the Pennsylvania Supreme Court serving in this role until his retirement from the bench in 1980. The swearing in ceremony was held at what later became Eagen Auditorium, at the University of Scranton. This was the first and only time the Pennsylvania Supreme Court has been in session in Scranton, Pennsylvania.

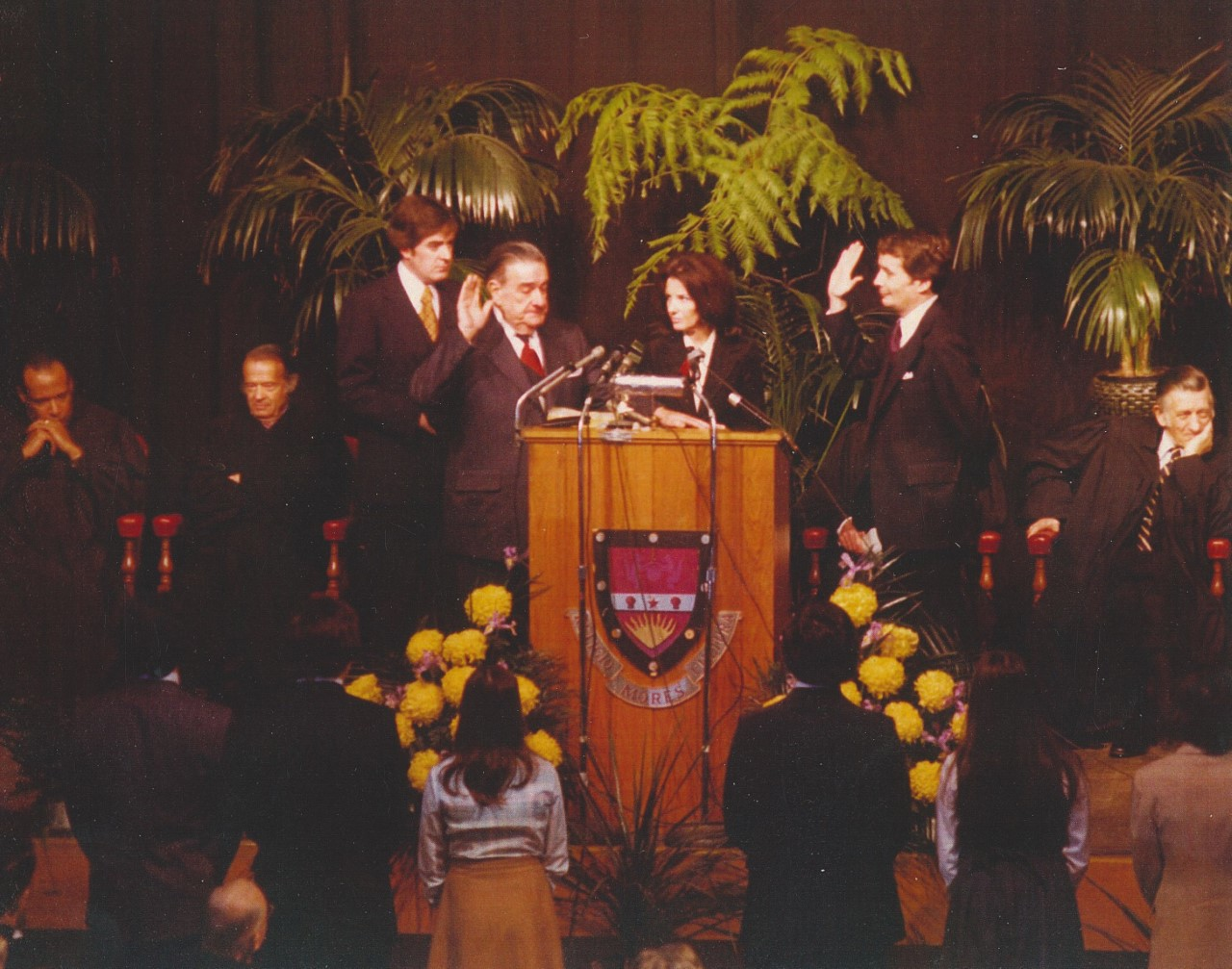
Chief Justice Michael J. Eagen Swearing In 1977

On November 12, 1987, Eagen's portrait was hung in the Courtroom of the Pennsylvania Supreme Court in Philadelphia City Hall. During the Ceremony, Chief Judge William J. Nealon of the United States District Court, Middle District of Pennsylvania, remarked that: "When I was a young man, the name Michael Eagen was a household word in Lackawanna County. His popularity knew no bounds. Everyone regardless of party or position respected and truly adored him."

On May 4, 2018, the Main Courtroom in the Lackawanna County Courthouse, Scranton, Pennsylvania, was dedicated in honor of Chief Justice Michael J. Eagen.

On May 19, 2023, a monument was dedicated at Lackawanna County Courthouse Square, Scranton, PA, in honor of Chief Justice Michael J. Eagen as a Distinguished Citizen of Lackawanna County.

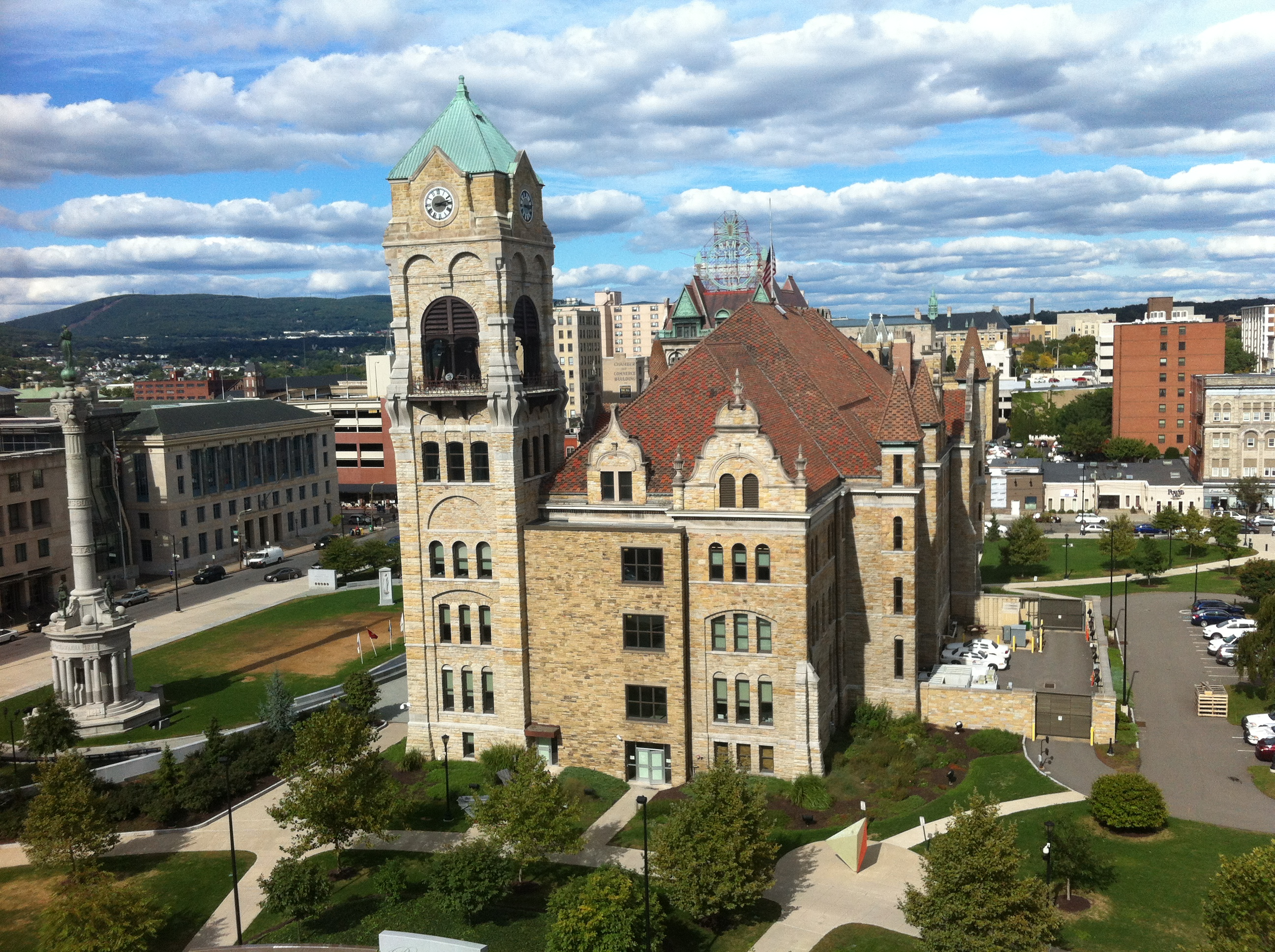
Lackawanna County Courthouse

Eagen died in Scranton, Pennsylvania, on July 7, 1987.
