= David L. Lawrence =

American politician

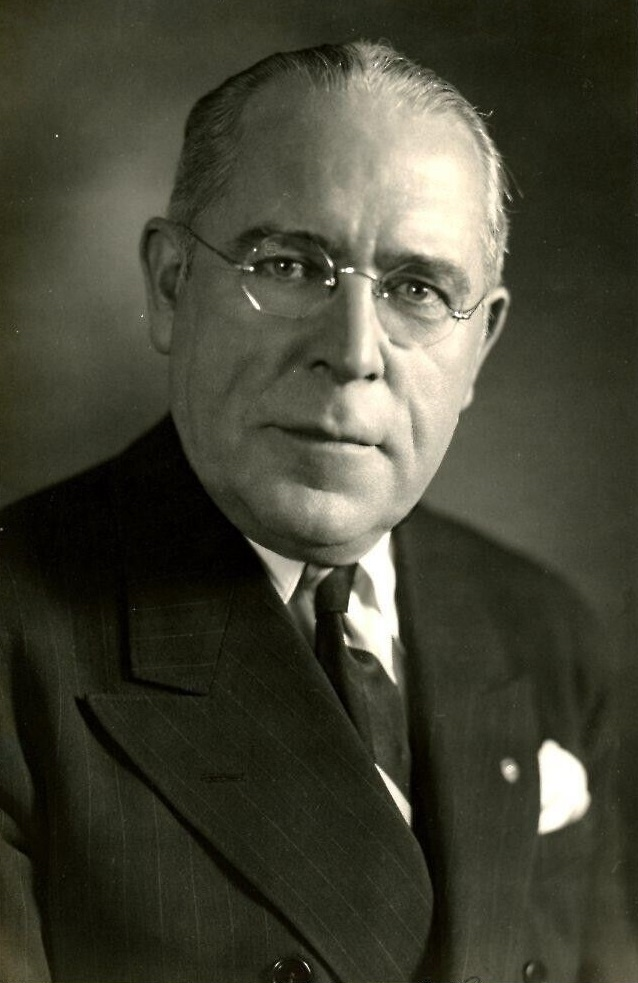
- Lawrence circa 1955

37th Governor of Pennsylvania
- In office January 20, 1959 – January 15, 1963
- Lieutenant: John Morgan Davis
- Preceded by: George M. Leader
- Succeeded by: William Scranton

51st Mayor of Pittsburgh
- In office January 7, 1946 – January 15, 1959
- Preceded by: Cornelius D. Scully
- Succeeded by: Thomas Gallagher

9th President of the United States Conference of Mayors
- In office 1950–1952
- Preceded by: Cooper Green
- Succeeded by: Martin H. Kennelly

Member of the Democratic National Committee from Pennsylvania
- In office May 22, 1940 – November 21, 1966
- Preceded by: George Howard Earle III
- Succeeded by: Joseph M. Barr

Secretary of the Commonwealth of Pennsylvania
- In office January 15, 1935 – January 17, 1939
- Governor: George Earle
- Preceded by: Richard Beamish
- Succeeded by: Sophia O'Hara

Chair of the Pennsylvania Democratic Party
- In office June 13, 1942 – December 19, 1945
- Preceded by: Meredith Meyers
- Succeeded by: Warren Mickle
- In office June 8, 1934 – May 22, 1940
- Preceded by: Warren Van Dyke
- Succeeded by: Meredith Meyers

Personal details
- Born: David Leo Lawrence; June 18, 1889 Pittsburgh, Pennsylvania, U.S.
- Died: November 21, 1966 (aged 77) Pittsburgh, Pennsylvania, U.S.
- Party: Democratic
- Spouse: Alyce Lawrence (m.1921)
- Children: 5
- Profession: Party delegate, Civil servant, Politician

David Leo Lawrence (June 18, 1889 – November 21, 1966) was an American politician who served as the 37th governor of Pennsylvania from 1959 to 1963. The first Catholic elected as Pennsylvania's governor, Lawrence is the only mayor of Pittsburgh to have also been elected as Governor of Pennsylvania. He served four terms as mayor, from 1946 through 1959. A panel of 69 scholars in 1993 ranked him third among the ten best mayors in American history.

== Early life ==
Lawrence was born into a working-class Irish Catholic family in the downtown Golden Triangle neighborhood of Pittsburgh, Pennsylvania. Too poor to attend college, Lawrence instead took a job as a clerk for Pittsburgh attorney William Brennan, the chairman of the local Democratic party and a labor movement pioneer. Brennan became a personal friend and mentor to the teenage Lawrence.

Lawrence entered the insurance business in 1916. In 1918 he entered the Army in World War I, serving as an officer in the adjutant general's office in Washington, D.C.

== Pittsburgh politics ==
When he returned home from the army in 1919, Lawrence was elected as chairman of the Allegheny County Democratic Party. At the time, Pittsburgh was a Republican bastion, with Democrats holding wide support only in the lower class and among recent immigrants, who were concentrated in industrial jobs. With the help of Joe Guffey, a future US Senator, Lawrence led the rising Pennsylvania Democratic party that would soon dominate local and statewide politics. In the 1928 presidential election, Lawrence worked hard for Alfred E. Smith from New York, another Irish Roman Catholic politician who had also risen from the slums without the benefit of a formal education. The vicious anti-Catholic campaign that defeated Al Smith that year had a profound effect on Lawrence. He believed that Roman Catholicism was an insurmountable handicap in United States presidential politics. Consequently, at the 1932 Democratic National Convention, Lawrence deserted Al Smith's presidential campaign and delivered the Pennsylvania delegation to Franklin D. Roosevelt, solely because of his fear of the religious issue.

Meanwhile, in 1931, Lawrence had run for Allegheny County Commissioner but lost. It was one of his last losses, as the effects of the Great Depression and a series of scandals rapidly eroded support for the Republican party in Pittsburgh. Two years later, Lawrence was appointed U.S. Collector of Internal Revenue for Western Pennsylvania by President Franklin D. Roosevelt. In 1934, he helped elect George Earle as the first Democratic governor of Pennsylvania in the 20th century. Earle appointed him as the Secretary of the Commonwealth. That same year, Lawrence became state chairman of the Democratic Party.

=== Mayoralty ===
In 1945, Lawrence was elected mayor of Pittsburgh by a narrow margin. At the time, Pittsburgh was considered one of the most polluted cities in America, with smog so thick that it was not unusual for streetlights to burn during the daytime. Its industries had worked overtime during the war, adding to the pollution of air and water. Lawrence developed a seven-point program for Pittsburgh during his first days in office, making him one of the first civic leaders to implement a dedicated urban renewal plan. Republicans still controlled much of city politics and business at the time, so Lawrence had to forge bipartisan alliances to accomplish his objectives. His most famous partnership was with Richard Mellon, chairman of one of the largest banks in America and a staunch Republican. Despite their political differences, Mellon and Lawrence were both interested in the revival of Pittsburgh and both were early environmentalists. This partnership drove what came to be called the Pittsburgh Renaissance (later Renaissance I).

From 1950 through 1952, Lawrence served as president of the United States Conference of Mayors.

A 1993 survey of historians, political scientists and urban experts conducted by Melvin G. Holli saw Lawrence ranked as the third-best American big-city mayor to serve between the years 1820 and 1993.

== Pennsylvania politics ==
After an unprecedented four terms as mayor of Pittsburgh, Lawrence was drafted by Democrats to run for governor in 1958. He was initially reluctant, citing his age (nearing 70) as a potential drawback. He eventually accepted his party's nomination and narrowly defeated Reading businessman Arthur McGonigle to become Pennsylvania's 37th governor and its first Catholic one.

During his four-year term as governor, Lawrence passed anti-discrimination legislation, environmental protection laws, expanded Pennsylvania's library system, passed Pennsylvania's fair housing law, and advocated historic preservation. He also passed vigorous highway safety legislation, which some attribute to the fact that two of his sons were killed in an automobile accident. His expansion of state bureaucracies came at the price of budget deficits and tax increases, a move that angered many fiscal conservatives.

In 1960, Lawrence was among a group of political leaders who created the Finnegan Foundation, which provide practical training in government and politics for outstanding undergraduate students by offering ten-week paid internships in the state government in Harrisburg each summer.

== National politics ==
Lawrence had attended his first Democratic National Convention as a page in 1912 and would attend every subsequent convention until his death. He was instrumental in the nominations of Franklin Delano Roosevelt in 1932 and John F. Kennedy in 1960, and became known as the "maker of presidents". In the weeks leading up to the 1948 Democratic National Convention, Lawrence was one of the few urban bosses to support Harry S Truman's attempts to win the Presidential nomination.

At the 1948 Democratic Convention in Philadelphia, where Harry Truman sought the Democratic presidential nomination with Lawrence's support, however, Lawrence would surprise liberals and conservatives alike by shifting the Pennsylvania delegation away from the more tepid civil rights plank that the Administration preferred to a more aggressively liberal one. Lawrence is often credited with convincing John F. Kennedy to choose Lyndon Johnson as his running mate to balance the ticket and mend a rift between northern and southern Democrats.

In 1958 (during the heat of the Governor's race), then Mayor Lawrence was eventually exonerated of influencing the Federal Communications Commission along with the U.S. Senator from Florida, George Smathers. The charges involved the granting of a television license to WTAE-TV between its ownership group and that of WPXI. The U.S. House hearings with Lawrence present were high drama.

== Later life ==
Limited to one term under existing state law, Lawrence retired from elected office in 1963. He continued to be active in Democratic politics and served the Kennedy and Johnson administrations as Chairman of the President's Committee on Equal Opportunities in Housing.

== Death ==
Lawrence fell ill and collapsed on November 4, 1966, at a campaign rally held at Pittsburgh's Syria Mosque for gubernatorial candidate Milton Shapp. He was rushed to a local hospital. He died 17 days later, having never regained consciousness. He was 77 years old. His death brought eulogies from both President Johnson and Harry S. Truman. Funeral services were held at St. Mary of Mercy Church in downtown Pittsburgh on November 25, 1966. The 2,000 attendees included Senator Robert F. Kennedy, Mayors Joseph M. Barr of Pittsburgh, Jerome Cavanagh of Detroit, James Tate and Richardson Dilworth of Philadelphia, Govs. William Scranton, James H. Duff, Raymond P. Shafer and John S. Fine, along with President Lyndon B. Johnson staff members Robert E. Kintner and W. Marvin Watson, Secretary of Agriculture Orville Freeman and Secretary of the Interior Stewart Udall. After the services all guests and family joined a 250-car motorcade following the hearse down the Boulevard of the Allies, across Grant Street and up I-376 for the burial.

He is buried in Pittsburgh's Calvary Cemetery, behind the plot of his longtime friend Harry Greb and beside the plots of his two eldest sons, who had died years before.

Lawrence's death was subsequently ascribed to the cramped conditions and limited resuscitation equipment in the hearse-type ambulance in which he was taken to hospital. This catalyzed reform and improvement in Pittsburgh's ambulance service and those of other American cities.

== Family ==
Lawrence's two eldest sons both died as passengers in a joyriding car accident on April 19, 1942, north of Pittsburgh near Zelienople along U.S. Route 19.

Another son, Gerald Lawrence, became the long-time Vice President and General Manager of Churchill Downs, the prominent racetrack in Louisville, Kentucky.

His grandson Tom Donahoe served as General Manager for the hometown Pittsburgh Steelers from 1991 until 1999, helping take the team to Super Bowl XXX. He later served as GM for the Buffalo Bills from 2001 until 2005, as well as a contributor to ESPN.com.

Another grandson, Gerald "Jerry" Lawrence, is the chair of the Pennsylvania Democratic Party’s seven-county Southeast Caucus and a former candidate for chairperson of the statewide Democratic Party.

== Honors ==
Buildings named in honor of Lawrence include The David L. Lawrence Convention Center in Pittsburgh, the David Lawrence Hall of the University of Pittsburgh, Lawrence Hall in the Governor's Quad at Indiana University of Pennsylvania, and Lawrence Hall of Point Park University. Lawrence is also honored at Edinboro University of Pennsylvania, as it named two dormitories the Lawrence Towers. The David L. Lawrence Library, later the David L. Lawrence Administration Center, at La Salle University was dedicated by Vice President Hubert Humphrey.

== Electoral history ==
- 1945 Race for Pittsburgh Mayor
  - David Lawrence (D), 52%
  - Rob Waddell (R), 47%
- 1949 Race for Pittsburgh Mayor
  - David Lawrence (D), 60%
  - Tim Ryan (R), 39%
- 1953 Race for Pittsburgh Mayor
  - David Lawrence (D), 62%
  - Leonard Patrick Kane (R), 37%
- 1957 Race for Pittsburgh Mayor
  - David Lawrence (D), 64%
  - John Drew (R), 35%
- 1958 Race for Pennsylvania Governor
  - David Lawrence (D), 53%
  - Arthur McGonigle (R), 46%

== References and further reading ==
- Heineman, Kenneth J. Catholic New Deal: Religion and Reform in Depression Pittsburgh (Penn State Press, 2010).
  - Heineman, Kenneth J. "A Catholic New Deal: Religion and Labor in 1930s Pittsburgh." Pennsylvania Magazine of History and Biography 118.4 (1994): 363–394. online
- Heineman, Kenneth J. "Catholics, Communists, and Conservatives: The Making of Cold War Democrats on the Pittsburgh Front." U.S. Catholic Historian (2016): 25–54. online
- Heineman, Kenneth J. "A Tale of Two Cities: Pittsburgh, Philadelphia, and the Elusive Quest for a New Deal Majority in the Keystone State." Pennsylvania Magazine of History and Biography 132.4 (2008): 311–340. online
- Holli, Melvin G. The American Mayor: The Best and the Worst Big-City Leaders (Penn State UP, 1999) pp 98–126.
- Isaacson, Mariel P. "Fantasy meets reality: the Pittsburgh renaissance and urban utopias." Journal of Urban History 41.1 (2015): 13–19.
- Lubove, Roy, ed. Twentieth Century Pittsburgh Volume 1: Government, Business, and Environmental Change (1996)
- Luconi, Stefano. "Machine politics and the consolidation of the roosevelt majority: The case of Italian Americans in Pittsburgh and Philadelphia." Journal of American Ethnic History (1996): 32–59. online
- McElligott, Patricia. Irish Pittsburgh (Arcadia, 2013) online.
- Shames, Sally Oleon. "David L. Lawrence, Mayor of Pittsburgh: Development of a Political Leader" (PhD dissertation, University of Pittsburgh; ProQuest Dissertations Publishing, 1958. 5805634)
- Smith, Eric Ledell, and Kenneth C. Wolensky. "A Novel Public Policy: Pennsylvania's Fair Employment Practices Act of 1955." Pennsylvania History (2002): 489–523. online
- Stave, Bruce M. The New Deal and the last hurrah: Pittsburgh machine politics (U of Pittsburgh Pre, 1970).
  - Stave, Bruce Martin. "The New Deal, the Last Hurrah, and the Building of an Urban Political Machine: Pittsburgh Committeemen, A Case Study." Pennsylvania History 33.4 (1966): 460–483. online
- Weber, Michael P. Don't Call Me Boss: David L. Lawrence: Pittsburgh's Renaissance Mayor (U of Pittsburgh Press, 1988) ISBN 0-8229-3565-1.

Political offices
Preceded by George Leader	Governor of Pennsylvania; 1959–1963	Succeeded by Bill Scranton
Preceded by Cornelius Scully	Mayor of Pittsburgh; 1946–1959	Succeeded by Thomas Gallagher
Preceded by Richard Beamish	Secretary of the Commonwealth of Pennsylvania; 1935–1939	Succeeded by Sophia O'Hara
Party political offices
Preceded by George Leader	Democratic nominee for Governor of Pennsylvania; 1958	Succeeded by Richardson Dilworth
Preceded by George Earle	Member of the Democratic National Committee from Pennsylvania; 1940–1966	Succeeded by Joe Barr
Preceded by Warren Van Dyke	Chairman of the Pennsylvania Democratic Party; 1934–1940	Succeeded by Meredith Meyers
