= List of justices of the Supreme Court of Pennsylvania =

Highest court in the U.S. state of Pennsylvania

Supreme Court of Pennsylvania
- Established: May 22, 1722 (1684 as Provincial Court)
- Location: Harrisburg; Pittsburgh; Philadelphia
- Composition method: partisan election with "Yes/No" retention vote at end-of-term
- Authorised by: Constitution of Pennsylvania
- Judge term length: 10 years
- Number of positions: 7
- Website: Pennsylvania Supreme Court website

Chief Justice
- Currently: Debra Todd
- Since: October 1, 2022

Court locations

== Current Bench ==
Name	Born	Joined	Party when first elected	Retention	Year of next retention election	Reaches age 75	Immediate prior position
Debra Todd; Chief Justice	October 15, 1957 (age 69) in Ellwood City, Pennsylvania	January 7, 2008	Democratic	2017	2027	October 15, 2032	Judge, Superior Court of Pennsylvania (2000–2007)
Christine Donohue	December 24, 1952 (age 73) in Coaldale, Pennsylvania	January 4, 2016	Democratic	First term	2025	December 24, 2027	Judge, Superior Court of Pennsylvania (2008–2015)
Kevin Dougherty	May 19, 1962 (age 64) in Philadelphia, Pennsylvania	January 4, 2016	Democratic	First term	2025	May 19, 2037	Judge, Philadelphia County Court of Common Pleas (2001–2015)
David Wecht	May 20, 1962 (age 64) in Baltimore, Maryland	January 4, 2016	Democratic	First term	2025	May 20, 2037	Judge, Superior Court of Pennsylvania (2012–2015)
Sallie Updyke Mundy	June 29, 1962 (age 64) in Elmira, New York	July 21, 2016 (Note: Sallie Updyke Mundy was nominated to fill a vacancy by Governor Tom Wolf and confirmed by the Pennsylvania State Senate in 2016. She was elected to a full term in 2017.)	Republican	First term	2027	June 29, 2037	Judge, Superior Court of Pennsylvania (2010–2016)
P. Kevin Brobson	November 26, 1970 (age 55) in Mountoursville, Pennsylvania	January 3, 2022	Republican	First term	2031	November 26, 2045	Judge, Commonwealth Court of Pennsylvania (2010-2021)
Daniel McCaffery	July 20, 1964 (age 62) in Philadelphia, Pennsylvania	January 2, 2024	Democratic	First term	2030	July 20, 2039	Judge, Superior Court of Pennsylvania (2020–2024)

== Complete list of justices ==
Following is a complete list of justices:

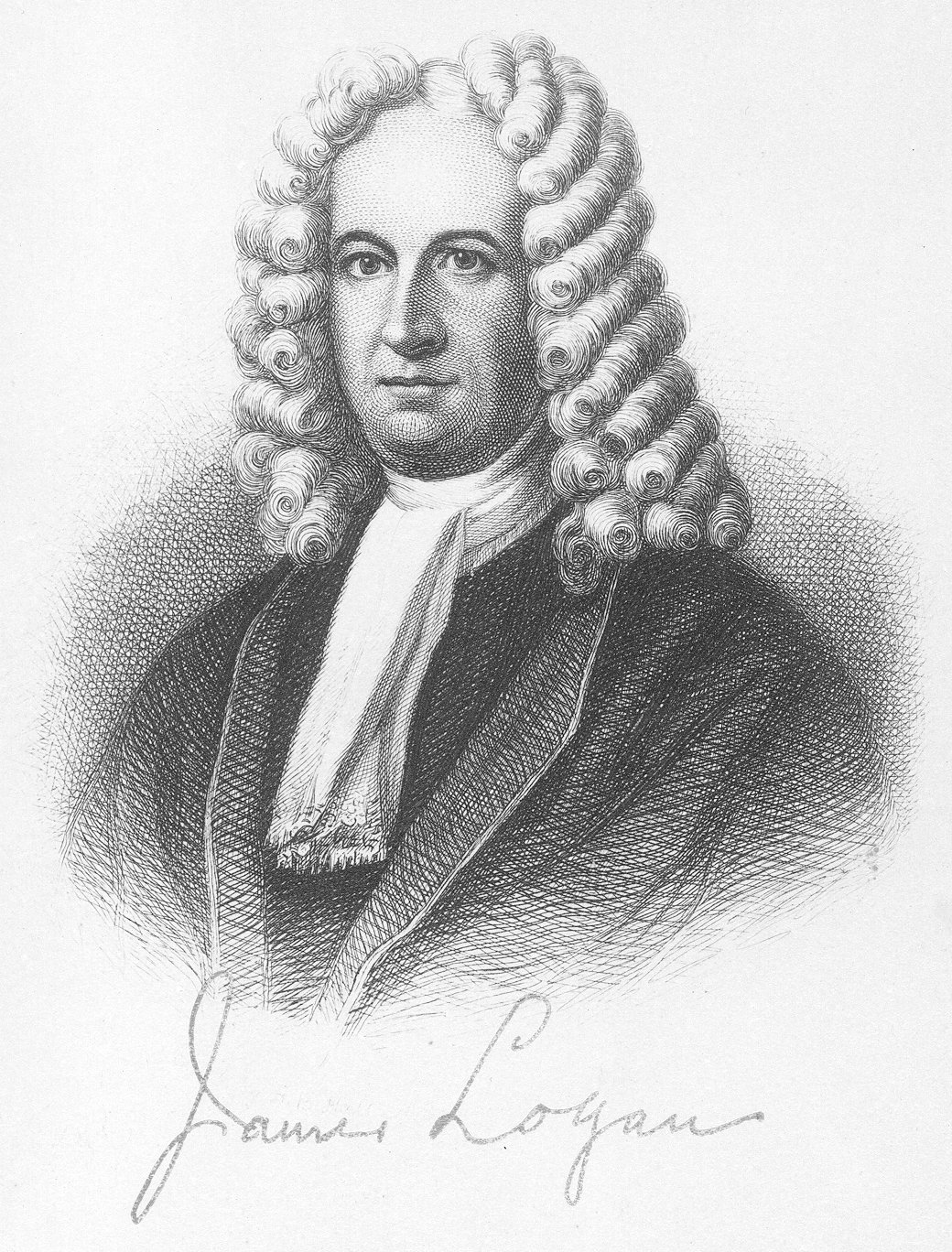
C.J Logan

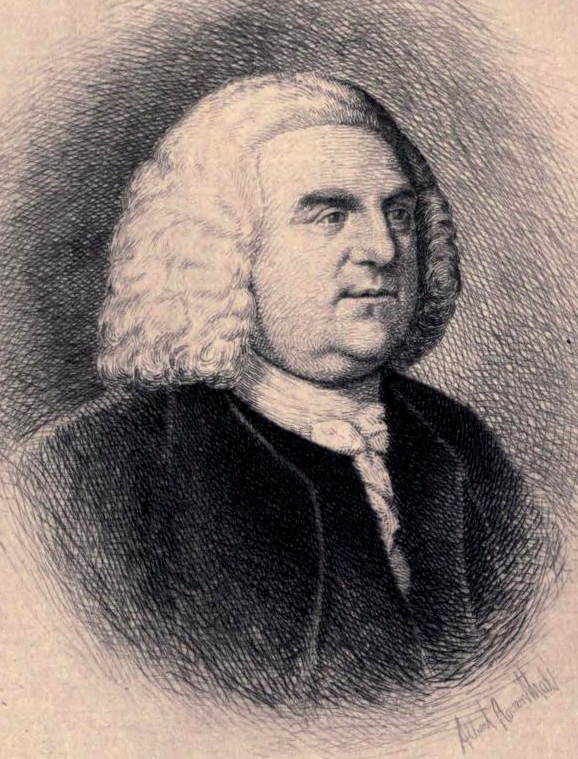
C.J. Allen

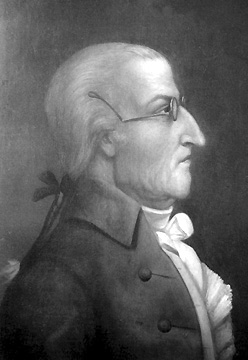
C.J. Chew

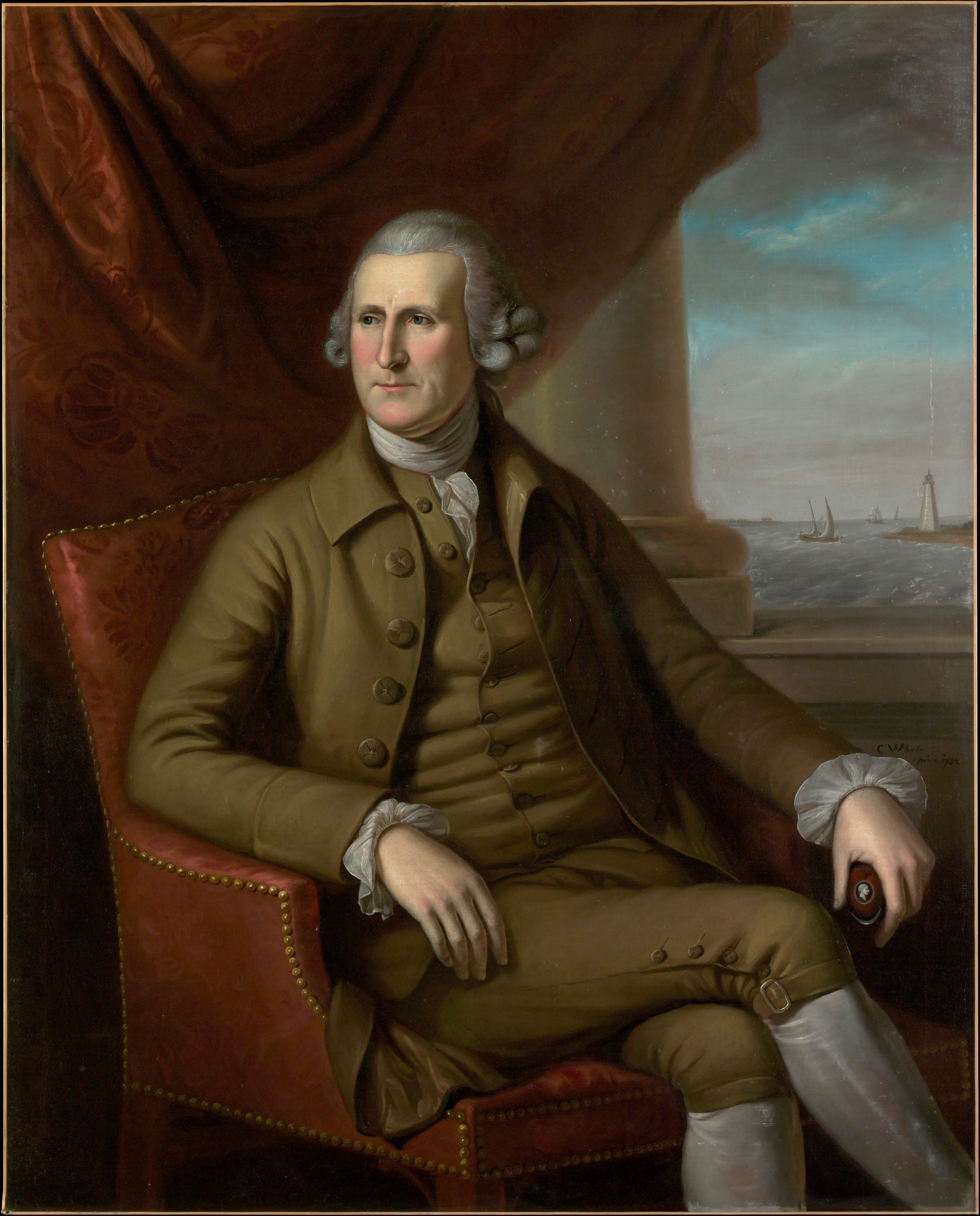
J. Willing

C.J. McKean

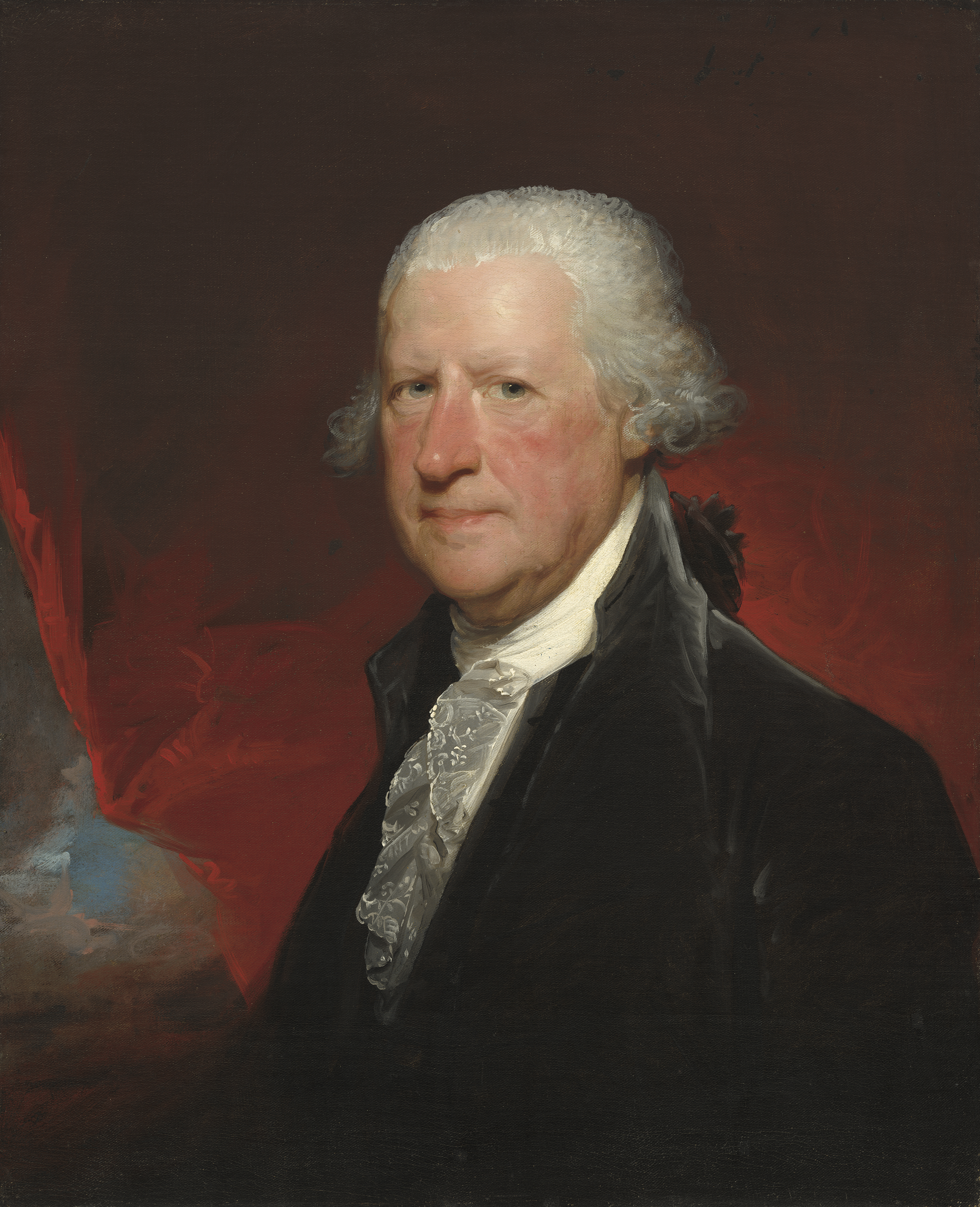
C.J. Shippen

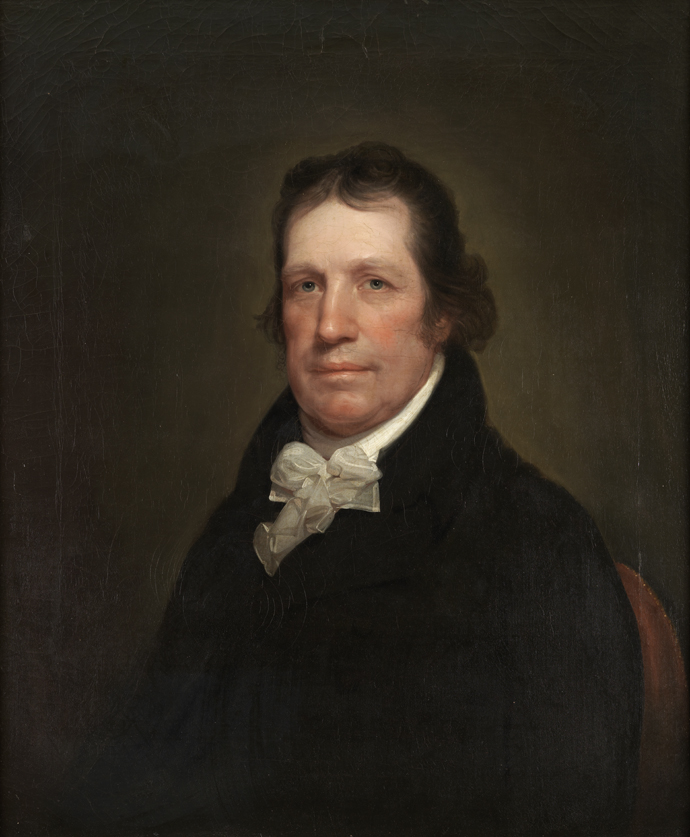
C.J. Tilghman

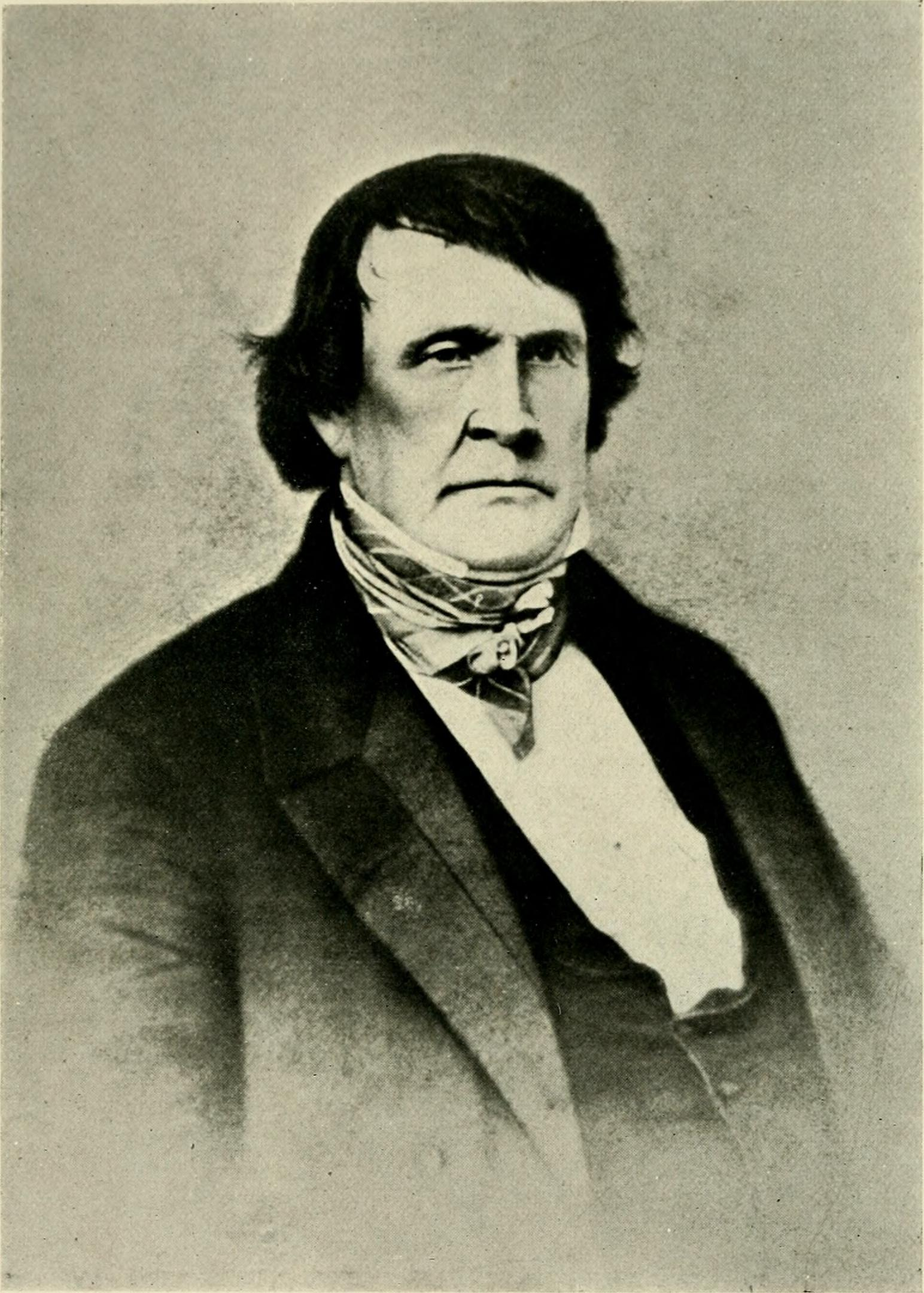
C.J. Gibson

C.J. Lewis

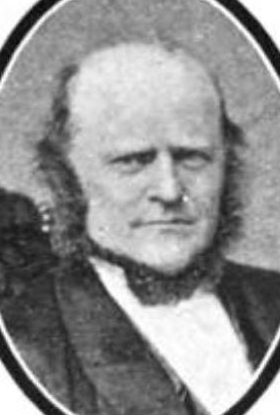
C.J. Lowrie

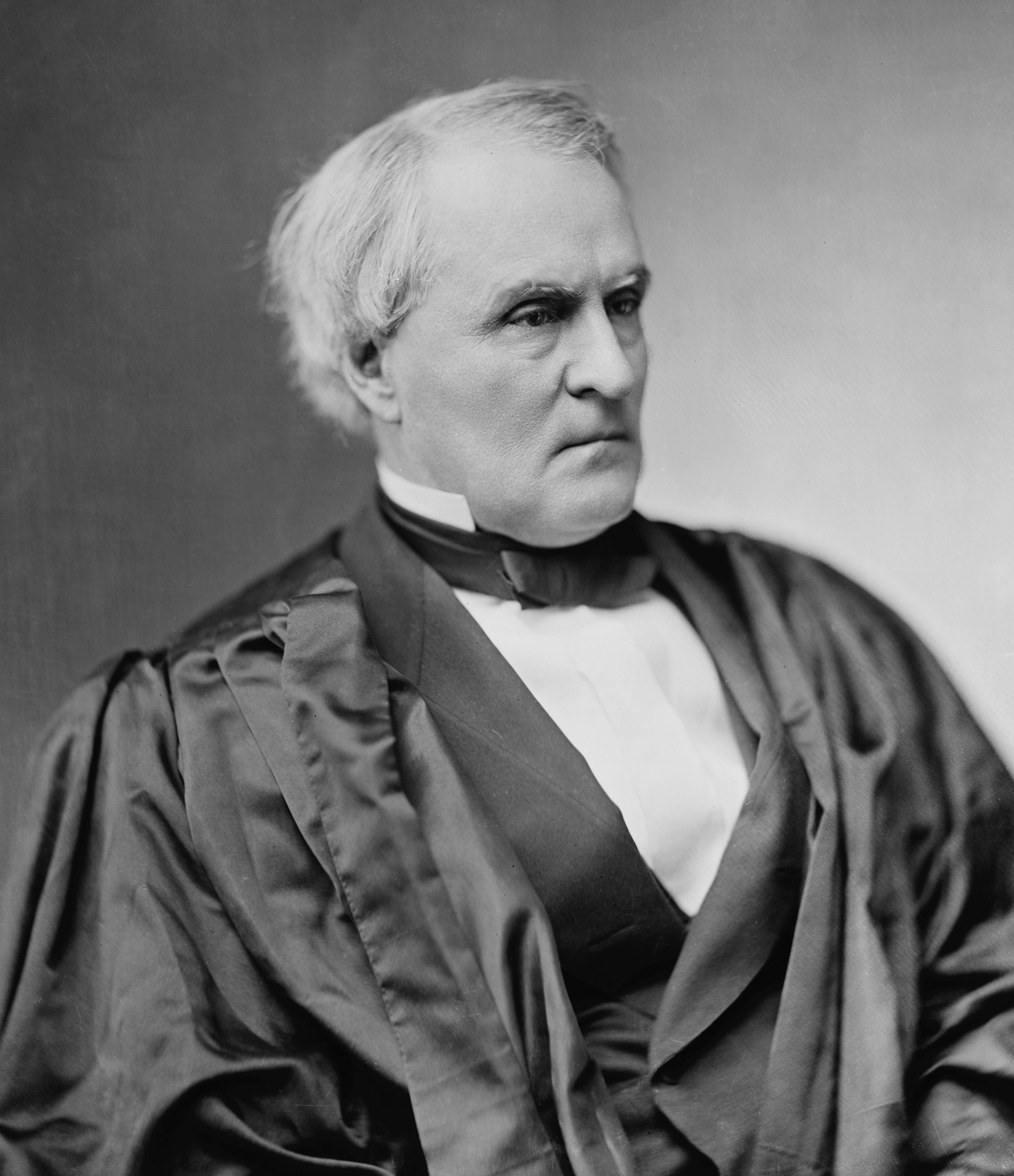
J. Strong

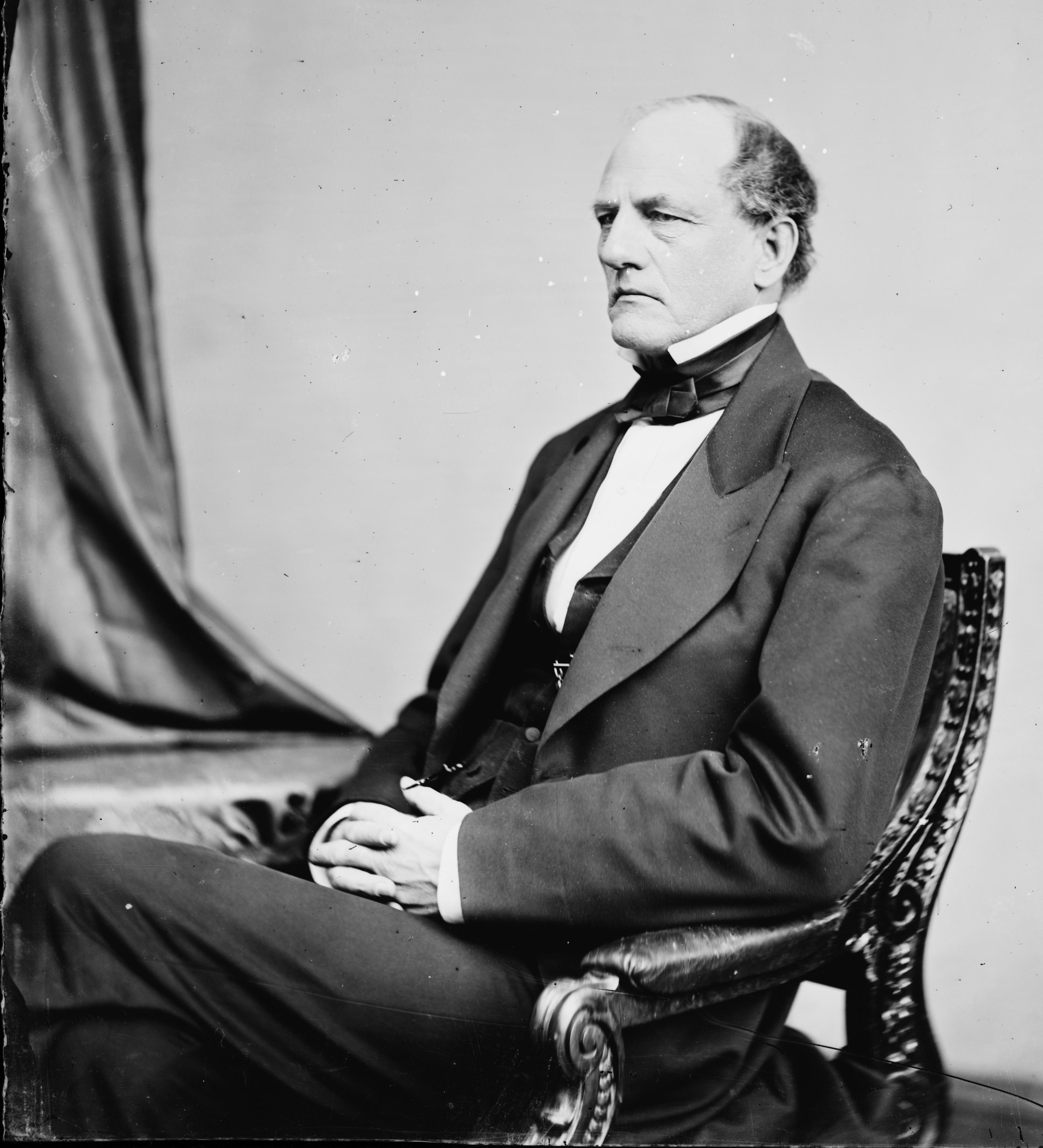
C.J. Woodward

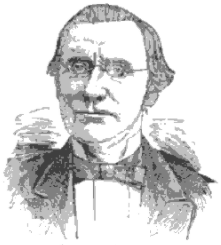
C.J. Agnew

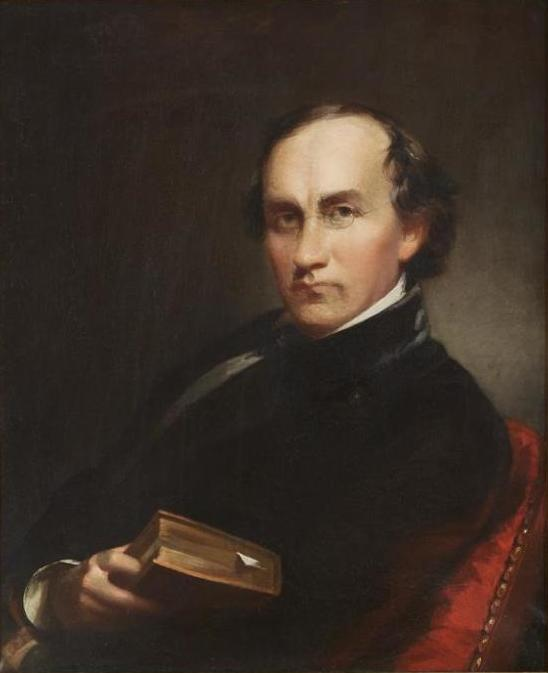
C.J. Sharswood

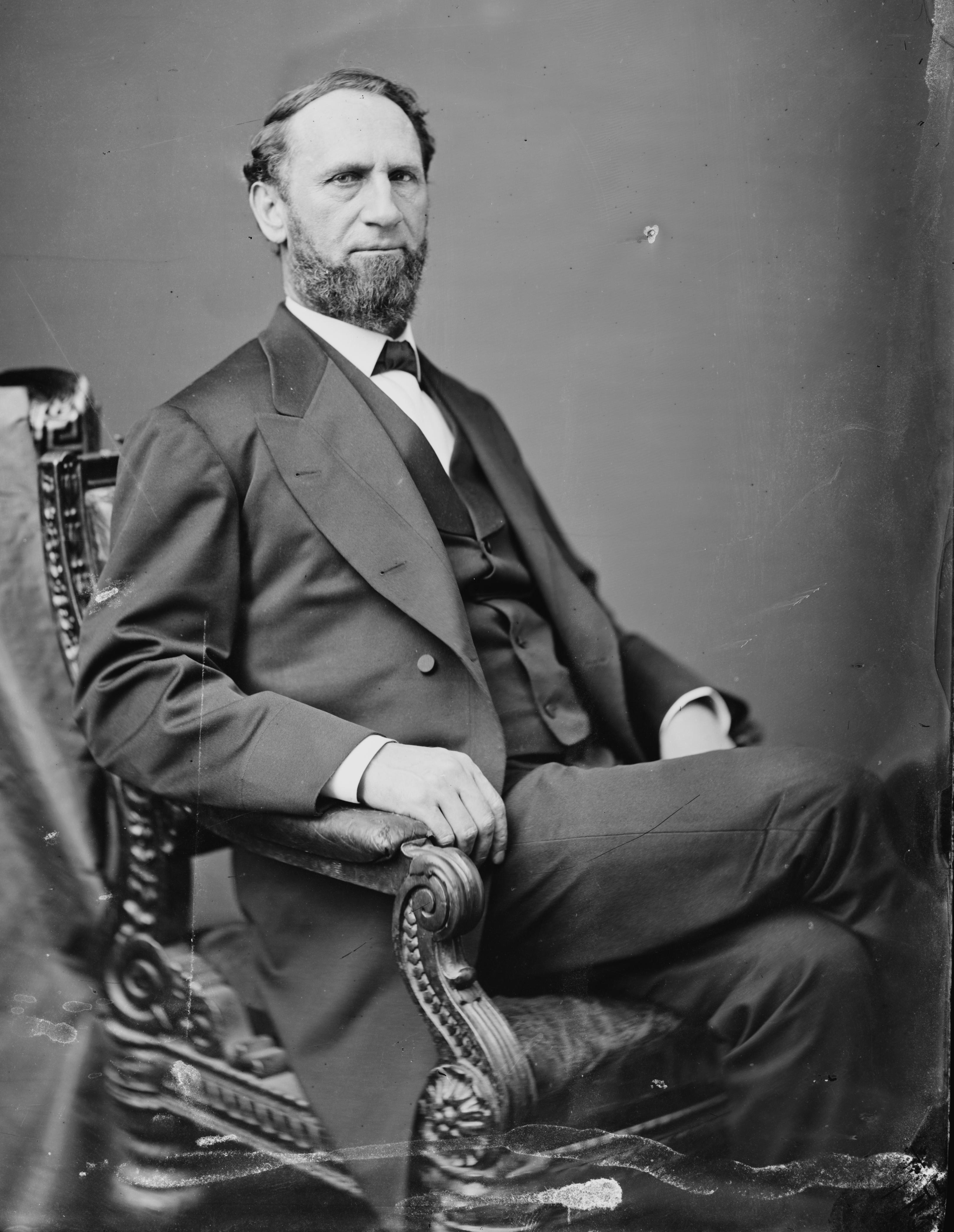
C.J. Mercur

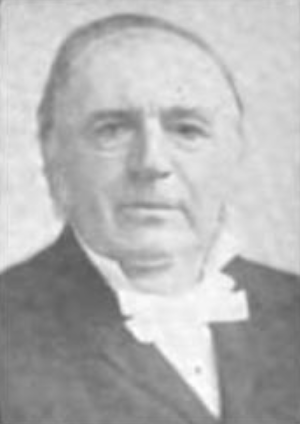
C.J. Paxon

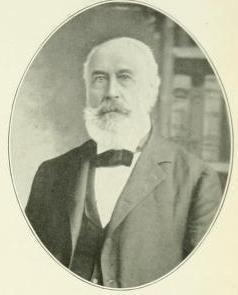
C.J. Sterrett

C.J. McCollum

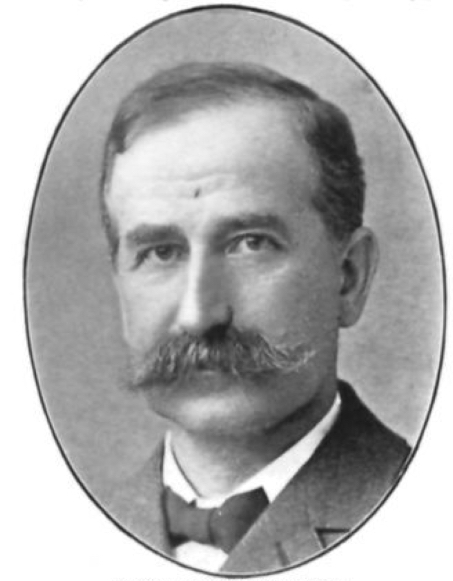
C.J. Fell

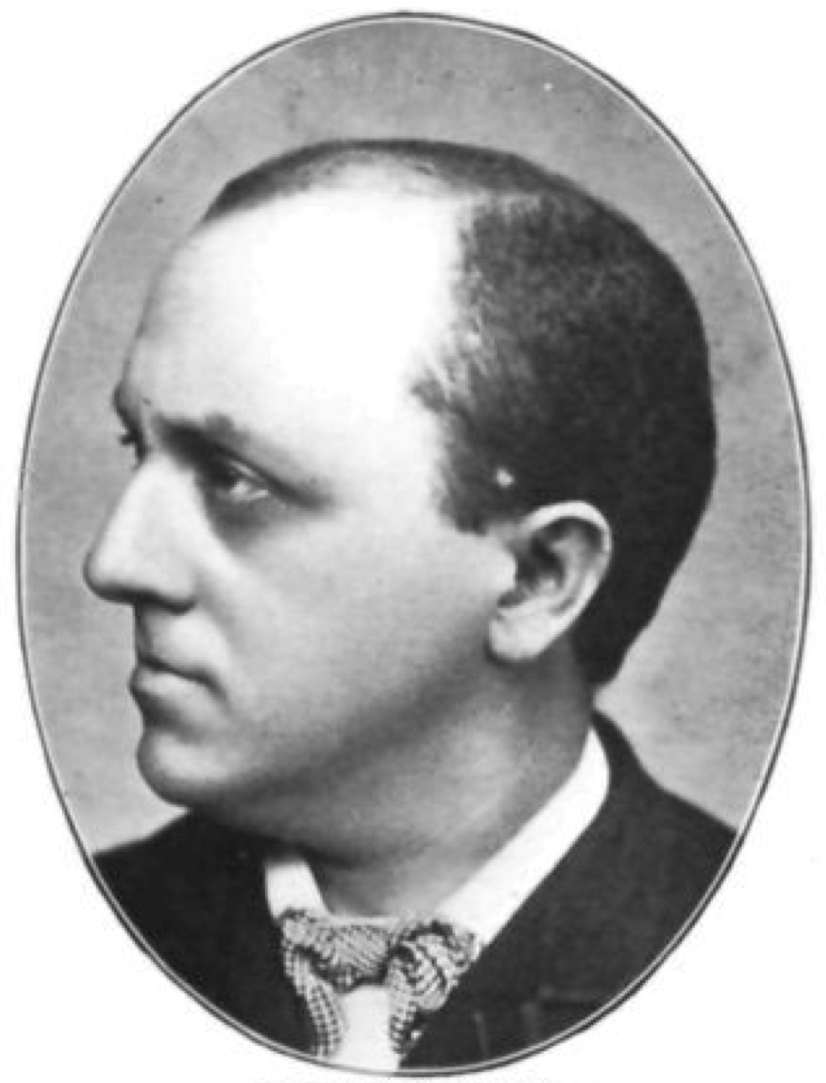
C.J. Brown

C.J. Schaffer

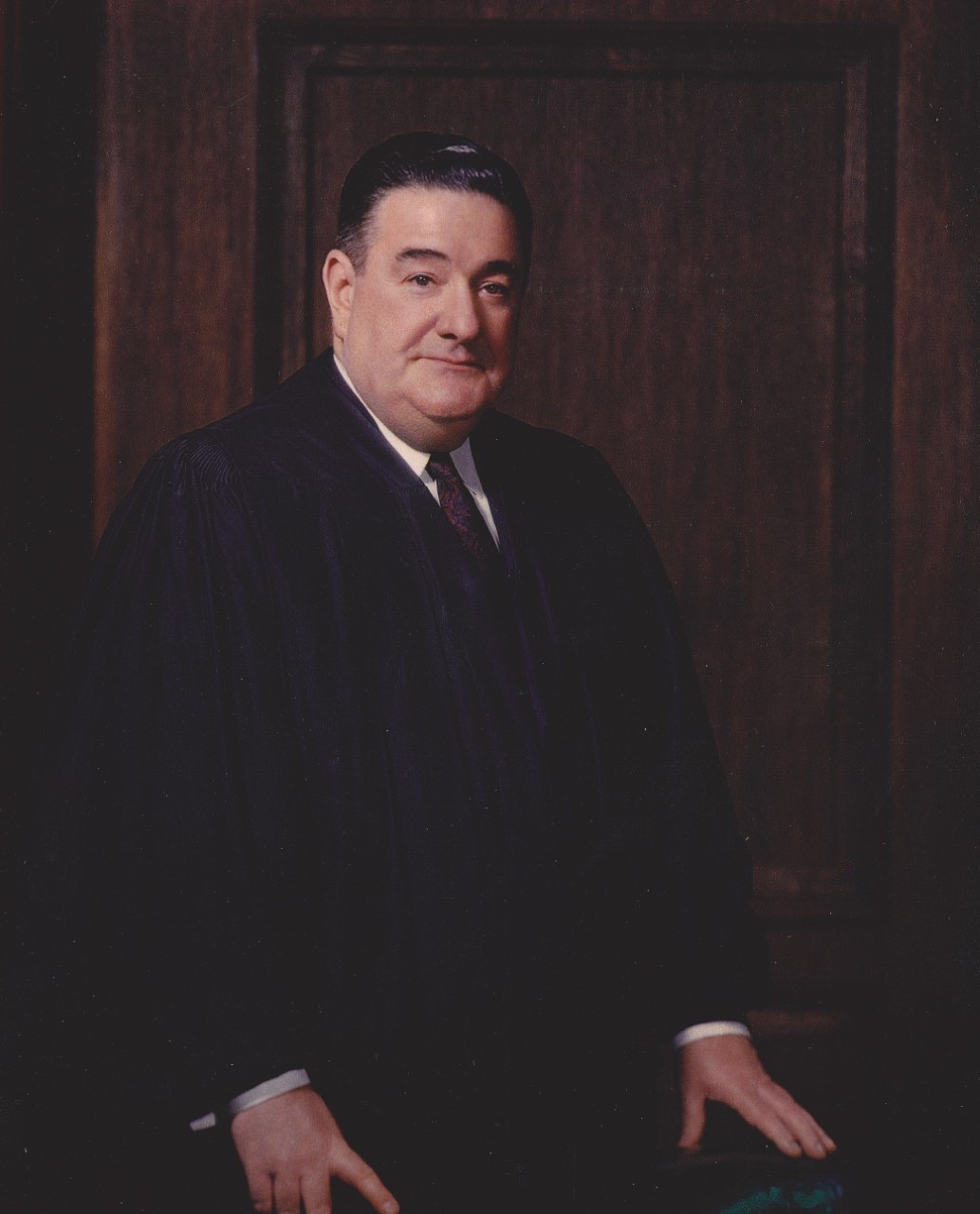
C.J. Eagen

Justice	Joined court	Chief Justice
William Welsh	1684	
William Crispin	1681	
William Wood	1684	
Robert Turner	1684	
John Eckley	1684	
Nicholas More	1684	1684
William Clarke	1684	1703–04
James Clapoole	1685	
Arthur Cooke	1685	1686–90
John Simcock	1686	1690–1701
James Harrison	1686	
John Cann	1686	
Joseph Growden	1690	1707–18
Thomas Wynne	1690	
Griffith Jones	1690	
Edward Blake	1690	
William Salway	1693	
Anthony Morris	1694	
Cornelius Empston	1697	
Edward Shippen	1698	
William Biles	1699	
Robert French	1701	
Caleb Pusey	1701	
Thomas Masters	1701	
Samuel Finney	1701	
John Guest	1701	1701–03, 1704, 1705–06
Jasper Yeates	1704	
William Trent	1704	
Roger Mompesson	1706	1706–07
Richard Hill	1711	
Jonathan Dickinson	1711	
George Roche	1715	
Robert Assheton	1716	
David Lloyd	1717	1718–31
Jeremiah Langhorne	1726	1739–42
Thomas Graeme	1731	
James Logan	1731	1731–39
Thomas Griffitts	1739	
William Till	1743	
Lawrence Growden	1750	
Caleb Cowpland	1750	
William Allen	1750	1750–74
William Coleman	1758	
Alexander Steadman	1764	
John Lawrence	1767	
Thomas Willing	1767	
John Morton	1774	
Benjamin Chew	1774	1774–77
William Augustus Atlee	1777	
John Evans	1777	
Thomas McKean	1777	1777–99
George Bryan	1780	
Jacob Rush	1784	
Edward Shippen IV	1791	1799–1806
Jasper Yeates	1791	
William Bradford	1791	
Thomas Smith	1794	
Hugh Henry Brackenridge	1800	
William Tilghman	1806	1806–27
John Bannister Gibson	1816	1827–51
Thomas Duncan	1817	
Morton Cropper Rogers	1826	
Charles Huston	1826	
John Tod	1827	
Frederick Smith	1828	
John Ross	1830	
John Kennedy	1830	
Thomas Sergeant	1834	
Thomas Burnside	1845	
Richard Coulter	1846	
Thomas S. Bell	1846	
George Chambers	1851	
Ellis Lewis	1851	1854–57
Walter H. Lowrie	1851	1857–63
George Washington Woodward	1852	1863–67
John C. Knox	1853	
Jeremiah S. Black	1851	1851–54
James Armstrong	1857	
James Thompson	1857	1867–72
William Strong	1857	
William A. Porter	1858	
Gaylord Church	1858	
John M. Read	1858	1872–73
Daniel Agnew	1863	1873–79
George Sharswood	1867	1879–83
Henry Warren Williams	1868	
Ulysses Mercur	1872	1883–87
Isaac G. Gordon	1873	1887–89
Edward M. Paxson	1875	1889–93
Warren I. Woodward	1875	
James P. Sterrett	1877	1893–1900
John Trunkey	1877	
Henry Green	1879	1900
Silas M. Clark	1882	
Henry Warren Williams	1887	
Alfred Hand	1888	
J. Brewster McCollum	1888	1900–03
James T. Mitchell	1888	1903–10
Christopher Heydrick	1891	
John Dean	1892	
Samuel Gustine Thompson	1893	
D. Newlin Fell	1894	1910–15
J. Hay Brown	1899	1915–21
S. L. Mestrezat	1899	
William P. Potter	1899	
John P. Elkin	1905	
John Stewart	1905	
Robert von Moschzisker	1910	1921–30
Robert S. Frazer	1915	1930–36
Emory A. Walling	1916	
Alexander Simpson Jr.	1918	
Edward J. Fox	1918	
John W. Kephart	1919	1936–40
Sylvester B. Sadler	1921	
William I. Schaffer	1920	1940–43
George W. Maxey	1930	1943–50
James B. Drew	1931	1950–52
William B. Linn	1932	
Horace Stern	1936	1952–56
H. Edgar Barnes	1935	
Marion D. Patterson	1940	
William M. Parker	1941	
Allen M. Stearne	1942	
Howard W. Hughes	1943	
Charles Alvin Jones	1945	1956–61
John C. Bell Jr.	1950	1961–72
Grover C. Ladner	1950	
T. McKeen Chidsey	1950	
Michael Musmanno	1952	
John C. Arnold	1953	
Benjamin R. Jones	1957	1972–77
Herbert B. Cohen	1957	
Thomas D. McBride	1958	
Curtis Bok	1958	
Michael J. Eagen	1960	1977–80
Anne X. Alpern	1961	
Henry X. O'Brien	1961	1980–83
Earl S. Keim	1962	
Samuel J. Roberts	1963	1983–84
Thomas W. Pomeroy Jr.	1968	
Alexander F. Barbieri	1971	
Robert N. C. Nix Jr.	1972	1984–96
Louis L. Manderino	1972	
Israel Packel	1977	
Rolf Larsen	1978	
John P. Flaherty Jr.	1979	1996–2001
Bruce William Kauffman	1980	
Roy Wilkinson Jr.	1981	
William D. Hutchinson	1982	
James T. McDermott	1982	
Stephen Zappala Sr.	1983	2002–03
Nicholas P. Papadakos	1984	
Juanita Kidd Stout	1988	
Ralph Cappy	1989	2003–08
Frank J. Montemuro Jr.	1992	
Ronald D. Castille	1994	2008–14
Russell M. Nigro	1995	
Sandra Schultz Newman	1995	
Thomas G. Saylor	1998	2015–21
Michael Eakin	2002	
William H. Lamb	2003	
Max Baer	2004	2021–22
Cynthia Baldwin	2006	
James J. Fitzgerald III	2007	
Debra Todd	2008	2022–
Seamus McCaffery	2008	
Jane Cutler Greenspan	2008	
Joan Orie Melvin	2010	
Correale Stevens	2013	
Christine Donohue	2016	
Kevin Dougherty	2016	
David Wecht	2016	
Sallie Updyke Mundy	2016	
Kevin Brobson	2021	
Daniel McCaffery	2024	
