= Godcharles v. Wigeman =

1886 Supreme Court of Pennsylvania decision on non-cash wages

- Court: Supreme Court of Pennsylvania
- Full case name: Godcharles & Co. v. Wigeman
- Decided: October 4, 1886
- Citation: 113 Pa. 431, 6 A. 354

Case history
- Appealed from: Pennsylvania Court of Common Pleas for Northumberland County

Court membership
- Chief judge: Ulysses Mercur
- Associate judges: Isaac G. Gordon; Edward M. Paxson; John Trunkey; James P. Sterrett; Henry Green; Silas M. Clark

Case opinions
- Decision by: Gordon
- Green took no part in the consideration or decision of the case.

Godcharles v. Wigeman, 113 Pa. 431 (1886), was a decision of the Supreme Court of Pennsylvania recognizing a freedom of contract between employers and their employees that state legislators were powerless to regulate. Specifically, this case struck down a state law requiring wages to be paid in cash.

Cited approvingly in Lochner v. New York (1905), this case has been retrospectively recognized as a precursor to the Lochner era of American legal history, in which economic regulations were frequently struck down by state and federal courts.

== Background ==
In April 1834, the Pennsylvania General Assembly standardized the measurement of "a ton" to 2000 pounds (the "short ton" definition). Frank Wigeman, who puddled pig iron into wrought iron for Godcharles & Co., sued in state court to invalidate his iron mill's workplace rules treating one ton as equal to 2240 pounds (the "long ton" definition"). Wigeman also sought to recover the wages that he would have been paid if Godcharles & Co. had used the state's short ton definition.

In June 1881, the Pennsylvania General Assembly required wages to be paid in cash, as opposed to company goods or scrip used in coal towns. Coal mines and steel manufacturers had historically paid their employees in such alternatives to cash to keep them tied to a single employer.

== Supreme Court of Pennsylvania ==
On appeal from the Pennsylvania Court of Common Pleas for Northumberland County, a trial-level state court, the Supreme Court of Pennsylvania heard arguments for this case on April 28, 1886.

On October 4, 1886, Associate Justice Isaac G. Gordon ruled on behalf of the Supreme Court of Pennsylvania. He held that if workplace rules were prominently posted, the iron mills' traditional use of the long ton definition could supersede state law in a contract between an employer and their employees.

Furthermore, Gordon held the state law requiring wages to be paid in cash violated both the 1874 Pennsylvania Constitution and federal freedom of contract. As a result, the Supreme Court of Pennsylvania allowed Godcharles & Co. to pay Wigeman's lost wages in coal, rather than United States dollars.

== Impact ==
In 1905, the Supreme Court of the United States decided Lochner v. New York, striking down a New York state law that set maximum working hours for bakers. In a 5–4 decision written by Associate Justice Rufus W. Peckham, the Supreme Court claimed that workers have a freedom of contract under the Fourteenth Amendment. As a result, the police power of state governments to regulate occupational health did not allow for interference in an employee's selection of their working hours. In support of this position, Peckham cited Godcharles v. Wigeman, among other state court cases.

However, the Supreme Court had upheld a similar Tennessee state law requiring wages to be paid in cash in Knoxville Iron Co. v. Harbison (1901). As a result, the University of Pennsylvania Law Review believed that such laws were still federally valid during the Lochner era.

Legal scholar Roscoe Pound ridiculed the Supreme Court of Pennsylvania's framing of employment laws as paternalistic, given the imbalance in negotiating power between an employer and their employees. While Pound predicted an imminent end to the Lochner era of judicial interference in such economic lawmaking in 1909, the Supreme Court continued this approach until its 1937 "switch in time that saved nine" upholding New Deal laws.
