= Thomas William Hawkins =

American death row inmate and suspected serial killer

- Hawkins's 2026 mugshot
- Born: Thomas William Hawkins Jr. December 31, 1963 (age 62); Philadelphia, Pennsylvania, U.S.
- Convictions: Stubbs: Third-degree murder Thomas: First-degree murder
- Penalty: Stubbs: 6-to-15 years imprisonment Thomas: Death

Details
- Victims: 2–3
- Span of crimes: 1980–1989
- Country: United States
- State: Pennsylvania
- Date apprehended: For the final time on March 8, 1990
- Imprisoned at: SCI Phoenix

Thomas William Hawkins Jr. (born December 31, 1963) is an American murderer and possible serial killer. Originally convicted as a juvenile for the 1980 murder of his girlfriend, Hawkins served 6 years out of a 15 year sentence before being released on parole – in 1989, he raped and murdered his 14-year-old niece in Stowe, Pennsylvania, leading to him being charged, convicted, and sentenced to death for that crime.

Hawkins remains on the state's death row for the latter murder, and is considered a suspect in the disappearance of a female acquaintance.

== Murder of Karen Stubbs ==
On August 3, 1980, the body of 15-year-old Karen L. Stubbs was found in a second-floor bedroom inside a dormitory of Kimbrough Hall, a part of the Pine Forge Academy located in Berks County, Pennsylvania. According to Pennsylvania State Trooper Edwin McFarland, there were indications that Stubbs had been strangled to death.

On September 8, police arrested 16-year-old Thomas Hawkins, Stubbs' boyfriend and a fellow student at the Academy who lived in a first-floor apartment with his mother Elmira, who worked as a nurse. He was charged with criminal homicide and held at the Berks County Jail, with $100,000 bail.

In February 1981, Hawkins pleaded guilty to third-degree murder charges and was sentenced to 6-to-15 years imprisonment for Stubbs' murder. According to his account, Hawkins put his arm around Stubbs' neck to prevent her from leaving a room, causing her to fall down and stop breathing. In a supposed fit of panic, he then cut a hole in her throat with a paint scraper in an attempt to free her breathing passages.

Hawkins spent approximately six years in prison for the crime before being released in late 1986.

== Murder of Andrea Thomas ==
On June 4, 1989, the body of 14-year-old Andrea Nicole Thomas was found inside the second-floor bedroom of her grandparents' home in Stowe, a census-designated place located in West Pottsgrove Township. An autopsy concluded that she had been raped, stabbed with a meat fork and strangled with a telephone cord, but at the time of discovery, there were no leads as to who might have been responsible. Shortly prior to her death, Thomas had moved to the town to escape escalating violent crime and drug abuse in her native Philadelphia, and was set to graduate from the Pine Forge Elementary School. The news of her murder shocked the local community, leading to some of her schoolmates going to counseling to deal with the trauma.

On March 8, 1990, Hawkins was arrested at an office belonging the Philadelphia Health Department, where he worked as a clerk. Detectives were led to him due to his previous conviction and the location of a fingerprint at the crime scene that was identified as belonging to Hawkins. While searching through his home, officers located numerous detectives' magazines depicting violent strangulations that had been highlighted or underlined. Initially, Hawkins claimed that he was at the house to retrieve his car keys and that while he had "wrestled" with Thomas, but claimed that he did not kill her. His claims were not believed, and District Attorney Michael D. Marino announced that his office would seek the death penalty against Hawkins.

In response to the arrest, Hawkins' family members insisted on his innocence and attempted to gather any information that would indicate that someone else was responsible. Similarly, his attorney, Sharon Brown, also demanded that the charges against her client be dismissed on the grounds that the only currently available evidence against him was the fingerprints found on the trash bag. This request was denied by Judge Charles Dasch, who denied bail and ordered that Hawkins would stand trial for the murder.

=== First trial ===
During the trial, the prosecution summoned Hawkins' family members to testify, despite the fact that all of them steadfastly maintained their belief that he was innocent after talking with him. When asked about why he had washed a pair of pants he had worn on the day of the murder, Hawkins claimed it was because his job at the time had a strict dress code and they had a tear in the crotch region. Supposedly, on the day of the murder, he was anxious to do his laundry because he was late for work, due to which he washed the pants and underwear he was wearing. The prosecutors contended that the real reason why Hawkins washed them was to get rid of evidence, pointing out the fact threads found at the crime scene were a match to the pants.

On August 14, 1990, Hawkins was found guilty of Thomas' murder. The verdict was met with relief from the family members of his previous victim, Karen Stubbs, who stated that they could now start anew. On the other hand, Hawkins' family members protested the verdict and claimed that he had been framed by investigators. This sentiment was shared by his lawyer Sharon Brown, who claimed that she was prevented from bringing several crucial witnesses that could point to an unnamed man who supposedly was pressuring Thomas for sex shortly prior to her murder. Brown later stated that she would contact the NAACP and Jesse Jackson to investigate the trial proceedings, accusing the police of attempting to close the case instead of seeking actual justice for the victim.

On May 6, 1991, Judge S. Gerald Corso formally accepted the jury's recommendation, formally sentencing Hawkins to death for the murder of Andrea Thomas. Hawkins himself reportedly showed no reaction to the verdict, and spent his time tapping his fingers on a desk while listening to the verdict.

=== Overturning of conviction and second trial ===
On June 7, 1993, more than two years after his original trial, the Supreme Court of Pennsylvania overturned Hawkins' conviction on the grounds that the similarities pointed between the murder of Karen Stubbs and Andrea Thomas were prejudicial. Writing for the court majority, Judge Nicholas P. Papadakos argued that the two murders were very different and did not show any distinct pattern, in addition to stating that the Stubbs murder had been "accidental". Judge Frank J. Montemuro Jr. wrote a dissenting opinion on the ruling pointing that there were too many coincindences in the two murders for them to be completely unrelated, which was supported by Judges Robert N. C. Nix Jr. and Ralph Cappy.

Hawkins' retrial began in August 1994, with prosecutors bringing the original charges of first-degree murder and indecent assault again. The prosecutor, Bruce Castor, presented many pieces of evidence that pointed towards Hawkins' guilt – saliva samples, fingerprints and clothing fibers found on the pants Hawkins had been wearing – and presented testimony from FBI agents and former cellmates of Hawkins that implicated him in the murder.

In response, Hawkins' lawyer, Michael G. Floyd, stated that the FBI had not conducted DNA testing on the saliva samples and suggested that Thomas had instead been killed by a burglar. In order to support his claims, Floyd called forensic analyst David Bing to the stand to provide his findings from the DNA analysis. In it, Bing said that the DNA found from nail clippings and bodily fluids at the crime scene were not from Hawkins or Thomas, but also admitted that the testing on the remainder of the items was inconclusive. Bing also admitted that there were numerous errors in the preparation of the initial report documenting the findings which were pointed out by his colleague Henry Lee, which later had to be revised.

On August 27, 1994, Hawkins was found guilty on all counts and sentenced to death a second time.

== Current status ==
In January 1998, Governor Tom Ridge signed two death warrants – one for hired gunman Darrick Hall and the other for Hawkins, scheduling their execution dates to be on January 29 and February 3, respectively. Hawkins' execution was later stayed by the state's Supreme Court.

In May of that year, Governor Ridge signed three new death warrants, again including Hall and Hawkins, as well as another murderer named Jose Uderra. Hawkins' execution was scheduled for June 16, but was never carried out.

As of August 2026, Hawkins remains on the state's death row.

== Dawn Mozino case ==
On May 22, 1989, 24-year-old Dawn Marie Mozino, a nurse with mild intellectual impairments, left her workplace at the Bryn Mawr Hospital while en route to visit her boyfriend in Strafford. When she failed to return home the following day, her father reported her missing to the police, as this was considered out of character for her.

In the following days, volunteer firefighters, members of the Town Watch and even local psychics offered to search the area around Strafford for any sign of Dawn. From around that time, her mother suspected that Dawn might have been abducted by someone, prompting her to contact a congresswoman situated in Ridgewood, New Jersey to push for federal legislation concerning missing persons.

The Mozino family were eventually asked by the police to produce a list containing the names of all of Dawn's known friends and acquaintances. The seventh person on the list was Thomas Hawkins, who had previously worked with her at the Main Line Nursing & Rehabilitation Center and was seen with her on the day of her disappearance. However, as there was no concrete evidence to warrant an arrest, Hawkins was not charged in this case.

Mozino's mother, Diane, later attended Hawkins' trial for the murder of Andrea Thomas, jotting down any detail about him and his crimes in an attempt to find any connection to her daughter's case. However, in the end, no new information was provided, and Hawkins rejected a plea deal from the prosecutors that offered to take the death penalty off the table in exchange for pleading guilty to the Thomas murder and providing information about Mozino's disappearance.

In June 2001, a recently-convicted murderer named Gerald Bennett wrote a letter to the Delaware County authorities admitting that he had killed Mozino. While his story was initially deemed as credible, interviews with detectives later determined that his claims were way too vague and provided no new information that would indicate that he was responsible – as a result, his confession was deemed bogus, with Attorney Bruce Castor again reiterating that Hawkins remained the prime suspect.

Even after he became county commissioner and ceased working as a prosecutor, Castor remained convinced that Hawkins was responsible for Mozino's disappearance, saying in an interview that he was "the most calculating, evil criminal" he had encountered throughout his career.

== See also ==
- Capital punishment in Pennsylvania
- List of death row inmates in Pennsylvania
