= Commonwealth v. Brady =

- Court: Supreme Court of Pennsylvania
- Full case name: Commonwealth of Pennsylvania v. Anthony Edward Brady
- Decided: March 26, 1986
- Citations: 510 Pa. 123; 507 A.2d 66

Court membership
- Judges sitting: Robert N. C. Nix Jr., Rolf Larsen, John P. Flaherty Jr., James T. McDermott, William D. Hutchinson, Stephen Zappala Sr., Nicholas P. Papadakos

Case opinions
- Decision by: Larsen

Commonwealth v. Brady, 510 Pa. 123, 507 A.2d 66 (Pa. 1986), is a case decided by the Supreme Court of Pennsylvania in 1986 which overruled close to two centuries of decisional law in Pennsylvania and established a common law exception to the rule against hearsay.

== Rule of law ==
The decision stands for the proposition that the recorded, adopted statement of a witness to a crime inconsistent with her testimony at trial is properly admitted for both purposes of impeachment and as substantive evidence: "for its truth." In Commonwealth v. Lively, the rule was extended with respect to "verbatim contemporaneous recording[s] of . . . oral statement[s]," provided the "recordings" are electronic, audiotape, or videotape.

== Facts ==
The facts as set forth in the majority opinion are excerpted:

On September 14, 1980, the body of George Hoffman was discovered at about 7:30 a.m. at the Wilson Manufacturing plant in Sunbury where he was employed as a security guard. Appellee, Anthony Edward Brady, was arrested later that day and charged with the stabbing death of George Hoffman. Appellee was sixteen years of age at the time of trial, but was tried as an adult before a jury in the Court of Common Pleas of Northumberland County.

Evidence introduced at trial disclosed the following events. In the early morning hours of September 14, 1980, appellee awakened his girlfriend, Tina Traxler, at her residence in Sunbury and persuaded her to take a ride with him. The two drove around for a while until, near an area outside of Sunbury known as the Shale Pit, appellee ran the car into a ditch alongside a dirt road.

Unable to extricate the car from the ditch, appellee and Ms. Traxler began to walk back to Sunbury and, along the way, walked by the Wilson Manufacturing plant. They climbed the fence surrounding the plant and entered it through a side door. Once inside, appellee was attempting to pry open a dollar-bill change machine when George Hoffman, the plant security guard, encountered him and Ms. Traxler. A scuffle ensued during which appellee stabbed the victim who fell to the floor. Appellee and Ms. Traxler then left the plant and returned to Sunbury to their friends' home.

The most damaging evidence against appellee was a tape-recorded statement given by Tina Traxler to the police on the evening of September 14, 1980. That statement set forth the events recounted above. At trial, however, Tina Traxler, called as a witness for the Commonwealth, recanted the tape-recorded statement and testified that neither she nor appellee had entered the Wilson Manufacturing plant on September 14, 1980 after the car had broken down. Over objection, the Commonwealth was permitted to introduce the tape-recorded statement as substantive evidence, not merely to impeach Ms. Traxler's credibility.

== Application ==
Prior to the Supreme Court's decision in Brady, a criminal defendant could obtain a judgment of acquittal when the Commonwealth's case relied completely or principally on out of court statements by witnesses. The typical scenario would involve a witness that recanted or disavowed an earlier statement made to police officers (see Facts section infra) concerning the defendant's liability. Under Brady and its progeny, it is then for the finder of fact to determine whether the witness is telling the truth now, or whether the witness was being truthful when he or she gave the first statement to the police.
