= Greenwich Township, Warren County, New Jersey =

Township in Warren County, New Jersey, US

Greenwich Township, New Jersey
- Township
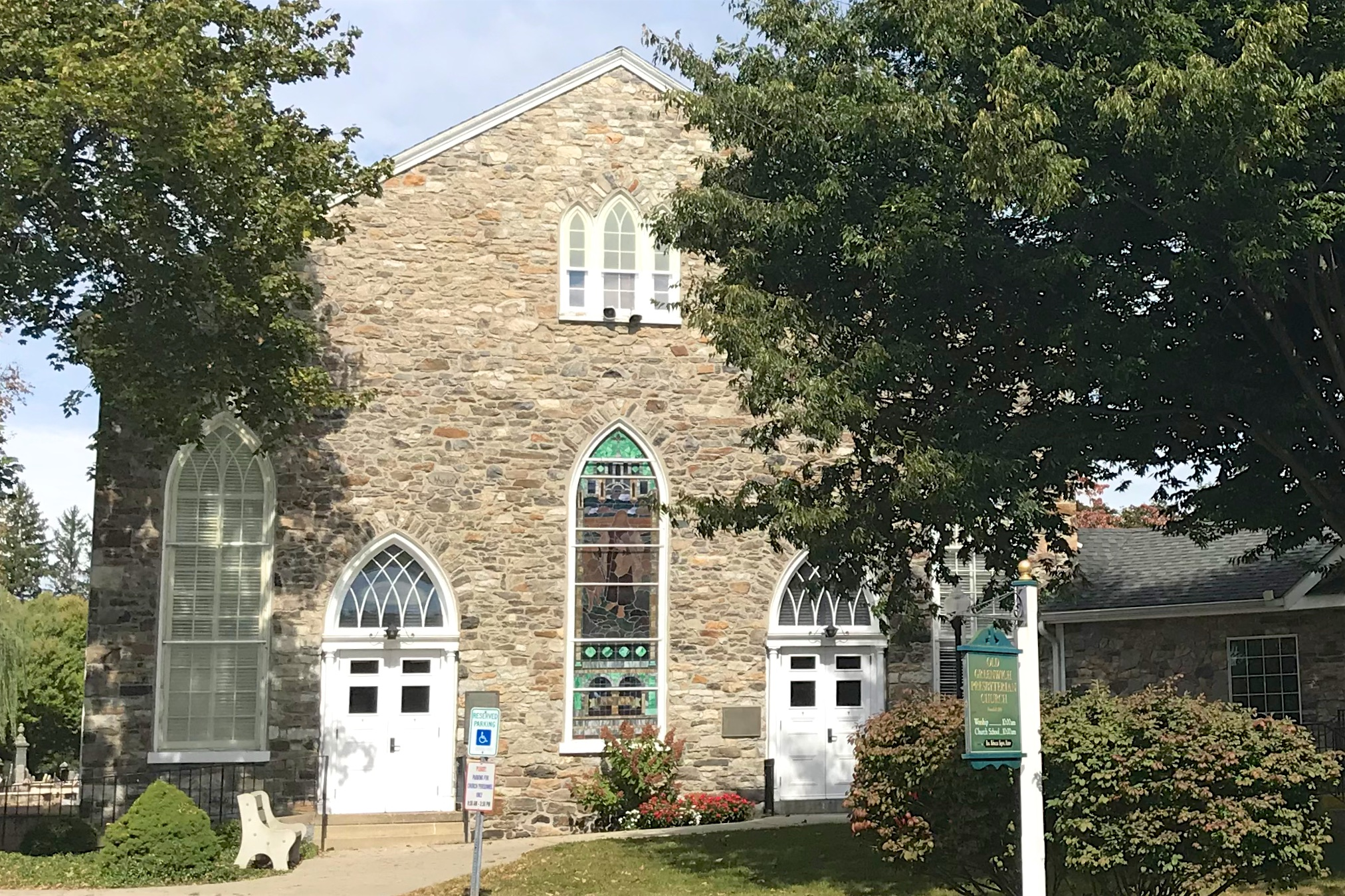
- Old Greenwich Presbyterian Church

- Seal

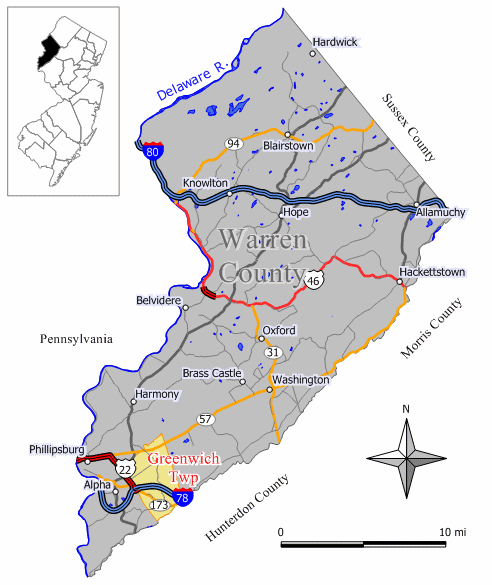
- Location of Greenwich Township in Warren County highlighted in yellow (right). Inset map: Location of Warren County in New Jersey highlighted in black (left).

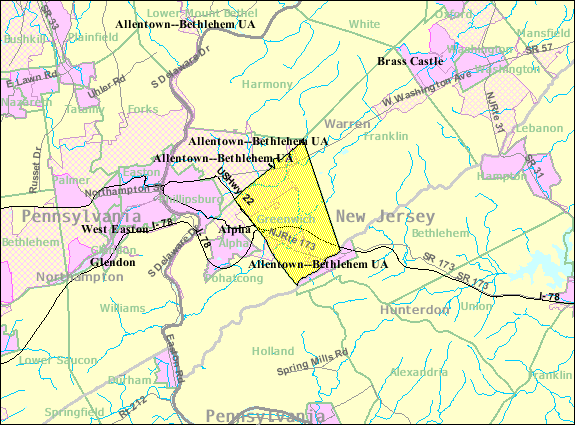
- Census Bureau map of Greenwich Township, Warren County, New Jersey

- Location of Greenwich Township within Warren County, New Jersey Location in New Jersey Location in the United States
- Coordinates: 40.680274°N 75.118709°W
- Country: United States
- State: New Jersey
- County: Warren
- First mention: October 9, 1738
- Incorporated: February 21, 1798
- Named after: Greenwich, England

Government
  - Type: Township
  - Body: Township Committee
  - Mayor: Robert M. Barsony (R, term ends December 31, 2023)
  - Administrator / Municipal clerk: Lisa A. Burd

Area
  - Total: 10.60 sq mi (27.45 km^{2})
  - Land: 10.58 sq mi (27.40 km^{2})
  - Water: 0.015 sq mi (0.04 km^{2}) 0.15%
  - Rank: 205th of 565 in state 15th of 22 in county
- Elevation: 325 ft (99 m)

Population (2020)
  - Total: 5,473
  - Estimate (2023): 5,503
  - Rank: 364th of 565 in state 8th of 22 in county
  - Density: 517.2/sq mi (199.7/km^{2})
  - Rank: 442nd of 565 in state 7th of 22 in county
- Time zone: UTC−05:00 (Eastern (EST))
  - Summer (DST): UTC−04:00 (Eastern (EDT))
- ZIP Code: 08886 – Stewartsville, New Jersey
- Area code: 908 exchanges: 213, 387, 454, 859
- FIPS code: 3404128260
- GNIS feature ID: 0882253
- School district: Phillipsburg School District
- Website: www.greenwichtownship.org

Greenwich Township (/ˈɡriːnwɪtʃ/) is a township in Warren County, in the U.S. state of New Jersey. As of the 2020 United States census, the township's population was 5,473, a decrease of 239 (−4.2%) from the 2010 census count of 5,712, which in turn reflected an increase of 1,347 (+30.9%) from the 4,365 counted in the 2000 census.

Greenwich Township has at various times been a part of most of Northwestern New Jersey's counties. The township was first mentioned in official documents on October 9, 1738, as a part of Hunterdon County. On March 15, 1739, it became part of the newly formed Morris County. On January 22, 1750, portions of the township were taken to form Hardwick Township. On June 8, 1753, Sussex County was created, and Greenwich Township was shifted again. Portions of the township were taken on May 30, 1754, to form both Mansfield Township and Oxford Township. The township was incorporated by an act of the New Jersey Legislature on February 21, 1798. It found its current home when Warren County was formed on November 20, 1824. On April 8, 1839, portions of the township were taken to create Franklin Township and Harmony Township. On March 7, 1851, Phillipsburg was created from parts of Greenwich, and Pohatcong Township went off on its own as of January 1, 1882. The township was named for Greenwich, England.

== Geography ==
According to the U.S. Census Bureau, the township had a total area of 10.60 square miles (27.45 km^{2}), including 10.58 square miles (27.40 km^{2}) of land and 0.02 square miles (0.04 km^{2}) of water (0.15%).

Greenwich CDP (with a 2020 Census population of 2,588), Stewartsville (with 646 residents in 2020) and Upper Stewartsville (2020 population of 329) are unincorporated communities and census-designated places (CDPs) located within the township.

Other unincorporated communities, localities and place names located partially or completely within the township include Coopersville, Kennedy Mills, Port Warren and Still Valley.

Greenwich Township borders the municipalities of Franklin Township, Lopatcong Township and Pohatcong Township in Warren County; and Bloomsbury in Hunterdon County.

== Demographics ==
Historical population
Census	Pop.	Note	%±
1810	2,528		—
1820	2,335		−7.6%
1830	4,486		92.1%
1840	2,902	*	−35.3%
1850	3,726		28.4%
1860	2,541	*	−31.8%
1870	2,587		1.8%
1880	2,554		−1.3%
1890	825	*	−67.7%
1900	909		10.2%
1910	904		−0.6%
1920	1,050		16.2%
1930	1,141		8.7%
1940	1,125		−1.4%
1950	1,217		8.2%
1960	1,397		14.8%
1970	1,482		6.1%
1980	1,738		17.3%
1990	1,899		9.3%
2000	4,365		129.9%
2010	5,712		30.9%
2020	5,473		−4.2%
2023 (est.)	5,503		0.5%
Population sources: 1810–1920 1840 1850–1870; 1850 1870 1880–1890; 1890–1910 1910–1930; 1940–2000 2000; 2010 2020 * = Lost territory in previous decade.

=== 2010 census ===
The 2010 United States census counted 5,712 people, 1,808 households, and 1,546 families in the township. The population density was 542.5 per square mile (209.5/km^{2}). There were 1,870 housing units at an average density of 177.6 per square mile (68.6/km^{2}). The racial makeup was 84.42% (4,822) White, 6.36% (363) Black or African American, 0.12% (7) Native American, 6.16% (352) Asian, 0.05% (3) Pacific Islander, 1.09% (62) from other races, and 1.80% (103) from two or more races. Hispanic or Latino of any race were 6.37% (364) of the population.

Of the 1,808 households, 51.5% had children under the age of 18; 76.1% were married couples living together; 6.7% had a female householder with no husband present and 14.5% were non-families. Of all households, 11.1% were made up of individuals and 4.4% had someone living alone who was 65 years of age or older. The average household size was 3.16 and the average family size was 3.43.

33.0% of the population were under the age of 18, 5.7% from 18 to 24, 25.1% from 25 to 44, 29.7% from 45 to 64, and 6.4% who were 65 years of age or older. The median age was 38.4 years. For every 100 females, the population had 95.8 males. For every 100 females ages 18 and older there were 93.4 males.

The Census Bureau's 2006–2010 American Community Survey showed that (in 2010 inflation-adjusted dollars) median household income was $102,250 (with a margin of error of +/− $16,103) and the median family income was $112,535 (+/− $19,851). Males had a median income of $95,469 (+/− $9,585) versus $60,986 (+/− $7,346) for females. The per capita income for the borough was $37,290 (+/− $3,322). About 1.1% of families and 1.7% of the population were below the poverty line, including 2.2% of those under age 18 and 5.2% of those age 65 or over.

=== 2000 census ===
As of the 2020 U.S. census, there were 4,365 people, 1,421 households, and 1,223 families residing in the township. The population density was 413.6 inhabitants per square mile (159.7/km^{2}). There were 1,477 housing units at an average density of 139.9 per square mile (54.0/km^{2}). The racial makeup of the township was 93.26% White, 2.47% African American, 0.27% Native American, 2.22% Asian, 0.07% Pacific Islander, 0.57% from other races, and 1.12% from two or more races. Hispanic or Latino of any race were 3.80% of the population.

There were 1,421 households, out of which 51.6% had children under the age of 18 living with them, 79.2% were married couples living together, 4.9% had a female householder with no husband present, and 13.9% were non-families. 11.4% of all households were made up of individuals, and 4.4% had someone living alone who was 65 years of age or older. The average household size was 3.07 and the average family size was 3.34.

In the township, the population was spread out, with 33.6% under the age of 18, 3.4% from 18 to 24, 38.0% from 25 to 44, 18.7% from 45 to 64, and 6.2% who were 65 years of age or older. The median age was 34 years. For every 100 females, there were 97.4 males. For every 100 females age 18 and over, there were 96.0 males.

The median income for a household in the township was $87,613, and the median income for a family was $92,579. Males had a median income of $69,926 versus $34,934 for females. The per capita income for the township was $32,886. About 1.1% of families and 2.4% of the population were below the poverty line, including 2.5% of those under age 18 and none of those age 65 or over.

== Government ==
=== Local government ===
Greenwich Township is governed under the Township form of New Jersey municipal government, one of 141 municipalities (of the 564) statewide that use this form, the second-most commonly used form of government in the state. The Township Committee is comprised of five members, who are elected directly by the voters at-large in partisan elections to serve three-year terms of office on a staggered basis, with either one or two seats coming up for election each year as part of the November general election in a three-year cycle. At an annual reorganization meeting, the Township Committee selects one of its members to serve as Mayor and another as Deputy Mayor.

As of 2022, members of the Greenwich Township Committee are Mayor Robert M. Barsony (R, term on committee and as mayor ends December 31, 2022), Deputy Mayor Paul Beam (R, term on committee and as deputy mayor ends 2022), Brian Baylor (R, 2023), Bill Kanyuck (R, 2023; appointed to serve an unexpired term) and Lillian McDermott (R, 2024).

In January 2022, the Township Committee appointed Bill Kanyuck to fill the seat expiring in December 2023 that had been held by Frank Marchetta until he resigned from office. Kanyuck will serve on an interim basis until the November 2022 general election, when voters will select a candidate to serve the balance of the term of office.

The Township Committee had three vacancies in September 2015, after Tom Callari announced that he was moving out of the township, Joe Tauriello left office after a DUI arrest was made public and Angelo Faillace resigned in protest of the process of selecting a council replacement. With a majority of seats vacant, Governor Chris Christie appointed Bob Barsony, Bill Kanyuck and Will Spencer to fill the three vacant seats. In November 2015, Deputy Mayor Elaine Emiliani resigned from office and was replaced by Frank Marchetta.

=== Federal, state and county representation ===
Greenwich Township is located in the 7th Congressional District and is part of New Jersey's 23rd state legislative district. Prior to the 2010 Census, Greenwich Township had been part of the 5th Congressional District, a change made by the New Jersey Redistricting Commission that took effect in January 2013, based on the results of the November 2012 general elections.

For the 119th United States Congress, New Jersey's 7th congressional district is represented by Thomas Kean Jr. (R, Westfield). New Jersey is represented in the United States Senate by Democrats Cory Booker (Newark, term ends 2027) and Andy Kim (Moorestown, term ends 2031).

For the 2026–2027 session, the 23rd legislative district of the New Jersey Legislature is represented in the State Senate by Doug Steinhardt (R, Lopatcong Township) and in the General Assembly by John DiMaio (R, Hackettstown) and Erik Peterson (R, Franklin Township).

Warren County is governed by a three-member Board of County Commissioners, who are chosen at-large on a staggered basis in partisan elections with one seat coming up for election each year as part of the November general election. At an annual reorganization meeting held in the beginning of January, the board selects one of its members to serve as Commissioner Director and other as Deputy Director. As of 2025, Warren County's Commissioners are:

Deputy Director Jason J. Sarnoski (R, Lopatcong Township; 2025), Lori Ciesla (R, Lopatcong Township; 2026), and Director James R. Kern III (R, Pohatcong Township; 2027).

Constitutional officers of Warren County are: Clerk Holly Mackey (R, Alpha; 2027), Sheriff James McDonald Sr. (R, Phillipsburg; 2025) and Surrogate Michael J. Doherty (R, Washington; 2025).

=== Politics ===
As of March 23, 2011, there were a total of 3,505 registered voters in Greenwich Township, of which 644 (18.4% vs. 21.5% countywide) were registered as Democrats, 1,474 (42.1% vs. 35.3%) were registered as Republicans and 1,385 (39.5% vs. 43.1%) were registered as Unaffiliated. There were two voters registered as either Libertarians or Greens. Among the township's 2010 Census population, 61.4% (vs. 62.3% in Warren County) were registered to vote, including 91.6% of those ages 18 and over (vs. 81.5% countywide).

Gubernatorial election results for Greenwich Township
Year	Republican		Democratic		Third party(ies)	
Year	No.	%	No.	%	No.	%
2025	1,320	54.03%	1,110	45.44%	13	0.53%
2021	1,119	61.35%	686	37.61%	19	1.04%
2017	855	58.72%	563	38.67%	38	2.61%
2013	954	73.05%	324	24.81%	28	2.14%
2009	1,141	66.96%	401	23.53%	162	9.51%
2005	1,037	62.32%	551	33.11%	76	4.57%

In the 2012 presidential election, Republican Mitt Romney received 1,415 votes (57.5% vs. 56.0% countywide), ahead of Democrat Barack Obama with 1,002 votes (40.7% vs. 40.8%) and other candidates with 28 votes (1.1% vs. 1.7%), among the 2,462 ballots cast by the township's 3,545 registered voters, for a turnout of 69.4% (vs. 66.7% in Warren County). In the 2008 presidential election, Republican John McCain received 1,448 votes (54.3% vs. 55.2% countywide), ahead of Democrat Barack Obama with 1,156 votes (43.3% vs. 41.4%) and other candidates with 19 votes (0.7% vs. 1.6%), among the 2,667 ballots cast by the township's 3,543 registered voters, for a turnout of 75.3% (vs. 73.4% in Warren County). In the 2004 presidential election, Republican George W. Bush received 1,645 votes (62.0% vs. 61.0% countywide), ahead of Democrat John Kerry with 967 votes (36.4% vs. 37.2%) and other candidates with 35 votes (1.3% vs. 1.3%), among the 2,654 ballots cast by the township's 3,310 registered voters, for a turnout of 80.2% (vs. 76.3% in the whole county).

United States presidential election results for Greenwich Township
Year	Republican		Democratic		Third party(ies)	
Year	No.	%	No.	%	No.	%
2024	1,756	54.82%	1,388	43.33%	59	1.84%
2020	1,786	53.55%	1,503	45.07%	46	1.38%
2016	1,525	57.94%	1,032	39.21%	75	2.85%
2012	1,415	57.87%	1,002	40.98%	28	1.15%
2008	1,448	55.20%	1,156	44.07%	19	0.72%
2004	1,645	62.62%	947	36.05%	35	1.33%

In the 2013 gubernatorial election, Republican Chris Christie received 73.0% of the vote (954 cast), ahead of Democrat Barbara Buono with 24.8% (324 votes), and other candidates with 2.1% (28 votes), among the 1,323 ballots cast by the township's 3,622 registered voters (17 ballots were spoiled), for a turnout of 36.5%. In the 2009 gubernatorial election, Republican Chris Christie received 1,141 votes (66.3% vs. 61.3% countywide), ahead of Democrat Jon Corzine with 401 votes (23.3% vs. 25.7%), Independent Chris Daggett with 140 votes (8.1% vs. 9.8%) and other candidates with 22 votes (1.3% vs. 1.5%), among the 1,720 ballots cast by the township's 3,442 registered voters, yielding a 50.0% turnout (vs. 49.6% in the county).

United States Senate election results for Greenwich Township1
Year	Republican		Democratic		Third party(ies)	
Year	No.	%	No.	%	No.	%
2024	1,715	55.09%	1,320	42.40%	78	2.51%
2018	1,257	58.25%	814	37.72%	87	4.03%
2012	1,331	57.54%	941	40.68%	41	1.77%
2006	1,007	64.30%	515	32.89%	44	2.81%

United States Senate election results for Greenwich Township2
Year	Republican		Democratic		Third party(ies)	
Year	No.	%	No.	%	No.	%
2020	1,810	55.18%	1,418	43.23%	52	1.59%
2014	776	59.88%	465	35.88%	55	4.24%
2013	481	61.59%	290	37.13%	10	1.28%
2008	1,556	61.80%	918	36.46%	44	1.75%

== Education ==
Students in public school for pre-kindergarten through eighth grade attend the Greenwich Township School District. As of the 2023–24 school year, the district, comprised of two schools, had an enrollment of 631 students and 54.0 classroom teachers (on an FTE basis), for a student–teacher ratio of 11.7:1. Schools in the district (with 2023–24 enrollment data from the National Center for Education Statistics) are Greenwich Elementary School with 420 students in grades pre-kindergarten to 5 and Stewartsville Middle School with 209 students in grades 6–8.

Public school students in ninth through twelfth grades attend Phillipsburg High School in Phillipsburg, which serves students from the Town of Phillipsburg as part of a sending/receiving relationship with the Phillipsburg School District. The high school also serves students from four other sending communities: Alpha, Bloomsbury (in Hunterdon County), Lopatcong Township and Pohatcong Township. As of the 2023–24 school year, the high school had an enrollment of 1,799 students and 139.5 classroom teachers (on an FTE basis), for a student–teacher ratio of 12.9:1.

Students from the township and from all of Warren County are eligible to attend Ridge and Valley Charter School in Frelinghuysen Township (for grades K–8) or Warren County Technical School in Washington borough (for 9–12), with special education services provided by local districts supplemented throughout the county by the Warren County Special Services School District in Oxford Township (for PreK–12).

== Transportation ==
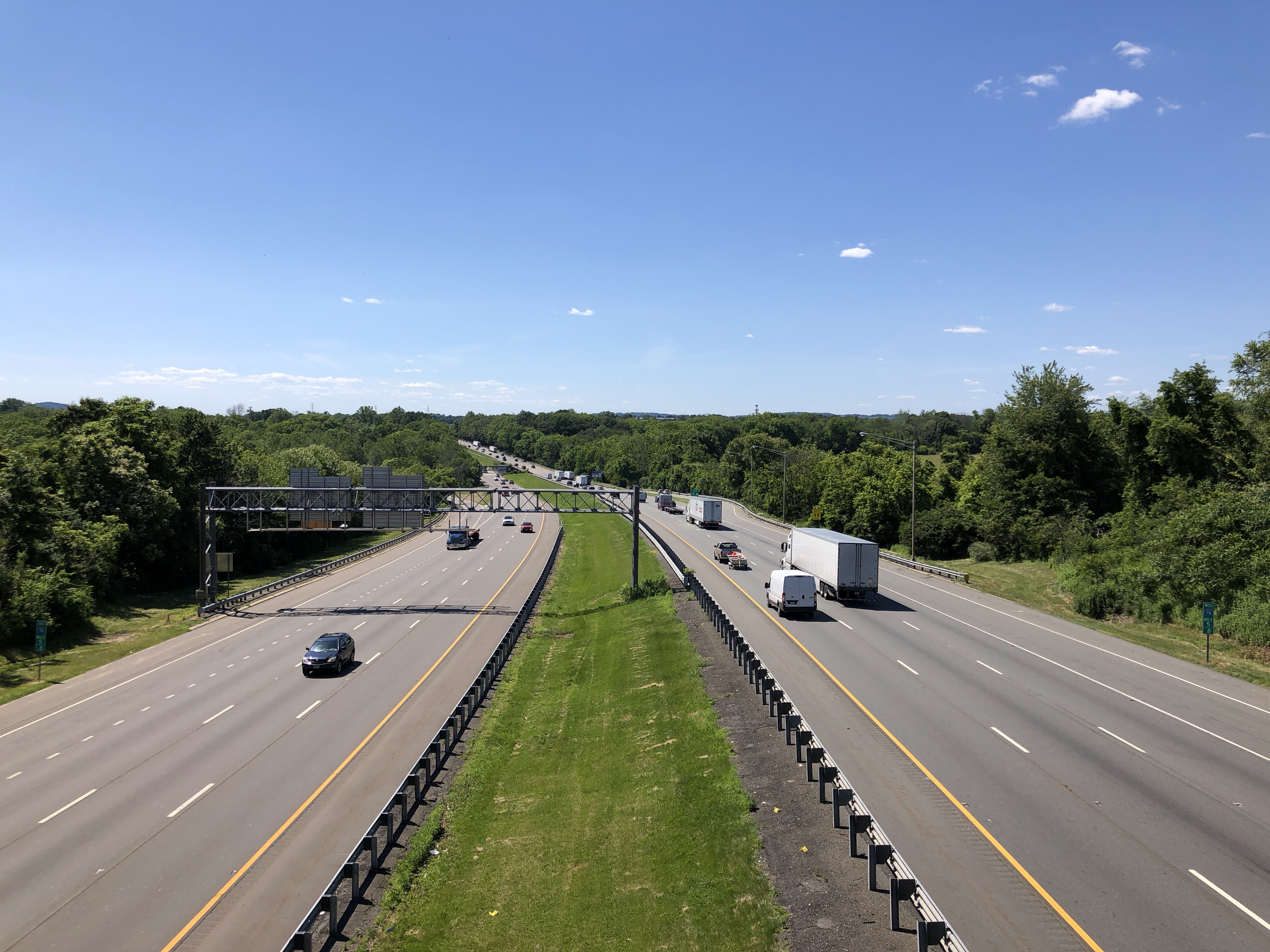
Interstate 78 and U.S. Route 22 westbound in Greenwich Township

As of May 2010, the township had a total of 48.98 miles (78.83 km) of roadways, of which 31.14 miles (50.11 km) were maintained by the municipality, 9.73 miles (15.66 km) by Warren County, 7.89 miles (12.70 km) by the New Jersey Department of Transportation and 0.22 miles (0.35 km) by the New Jersey Turnpike Authority.

Greenwich is accessible from Interstate, U.S. State and County roads. Interstate 78 passes through in the central area while U.S. Route 22 runs along the western border before running concurrent with I-78. Route 57 passes through in the north and Route 173's western end starts at the western municipal border at I-78/US 22. County Road 519 travels through the western corner for a short distance while County Road 579 passes through very briefly in the south before terminating at Route 173.

A small part of the Norfolk Southern Railway's Lehigh Line (formerly the mainline of the Lehigh Valley Railroad), runs through the southern part of Greenwich Township on its way to Phillipsburg, New Jersey.

== Notable people ==
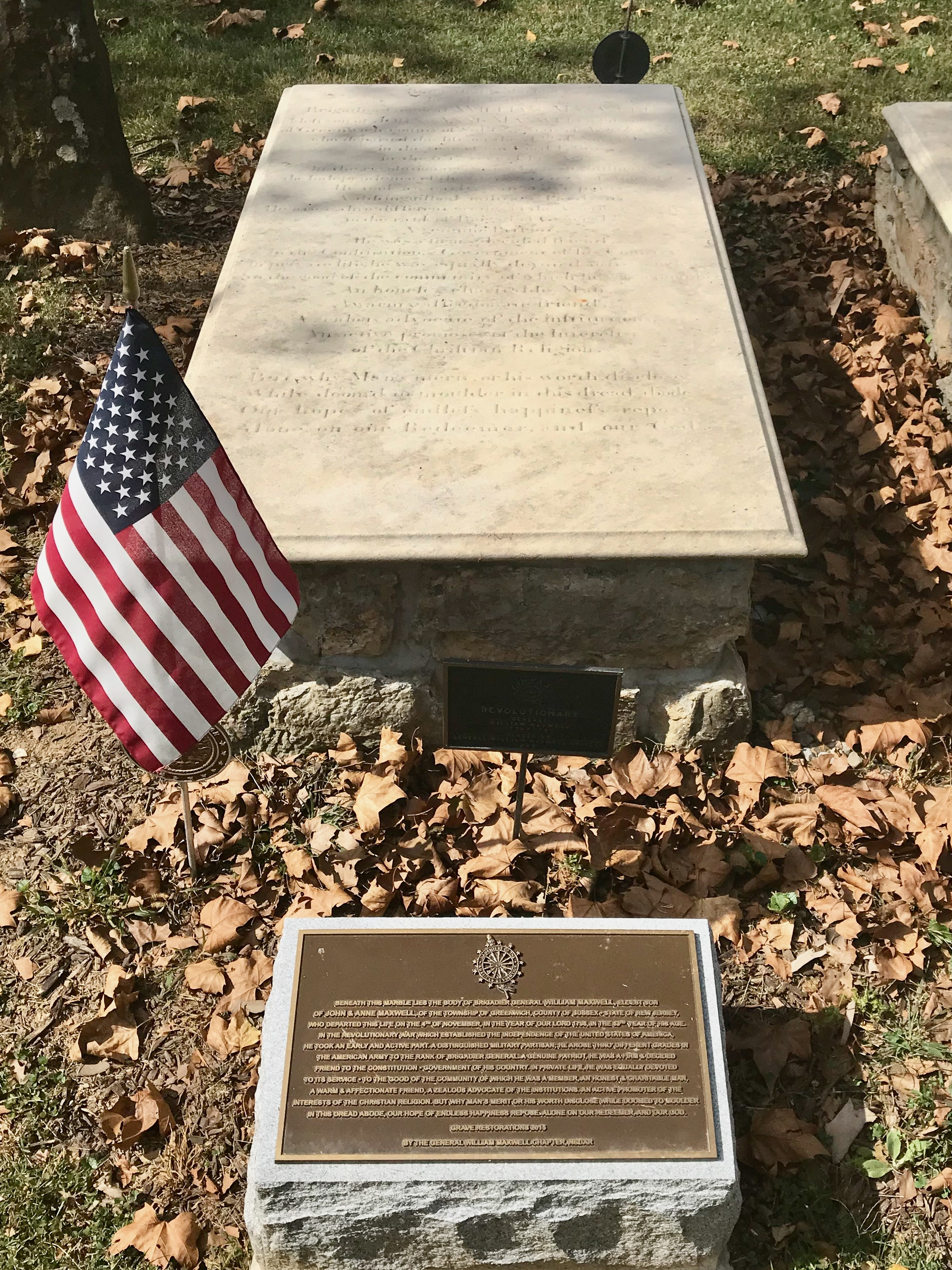
Gravestone of General William Maxwell at the Old Greenwich Presbyterian Church Cemetery

People who were born in, residents of, or otherwise closely associated with Greenwich Township include:

- Orange Cassidy (born 1984), professional wrestler
- Justin Gaymon (born 1986), former 400 metre hurdler
- Henry Green (1828–1900), Chief Justice of the Supreme Court of Pennsylvania
- William Maxwell (1733–1796), brigadier general in the Continental Army during the American Revolutionary War
