= Greenwich (CDP), Warren County, New Jersey =

Populated place in Warren County, New Jersey, US

Greenwich, New Jersey
- Census-designated place
- Location in Warren County Location in New Jersey Location in the United States
- Coordinates: 40.684908°N 75.133821°W
- Country: United States
- State: New Jersey
- County: Warren
- Township: Greenwich

Area
  - Total: 0.907 sq mi (2.349 km^{2})
  - Land: 0.907 sq mi (2.349 km^{2})
  - Water: 0 sq mi (0.000 km^{2}) 0.00%
- Elevation: 387 ft (118 m)

Population (2020 census)
  - Total: 2,558
  - Density: 2,820/sq mi (1,089/km^{2})
- Time zone: UTC−05:00 (Eastern (EST))
  - Summer (DST): UTC−04:00 (EDT)
- Area code: 908
- FIPS code: 34-28250
- GNIS feature ID: 02583994

Greenwich is an unincorporated community and census-designated place (CDP) located within Greenwich Township in Warren County, in the U.S. state of New Jersey, that was defined as part of the 2010 United States census. As of the 2010 Census, the CDP's population was 2,755.

== Geography ==
According to the United States Census Bureau, the CDP had a total area of 0.907 square miles (2.349 km^{2}), all of which was land.

== Demographics ==
Historical population
Census	Pop.	Note	%±
2010	2,755		—
2020	2,558		−7.2%
Population sources: 2010 2020

Greenwich first appeared as a census designated place in the 2010 U.S. census.

=== 2020 census ===
Greenwich CDP, Warren County, New Jersey – Racial and ethnic composition Note: the US Census treats Hispanic/Latino as an ethnic category. This table excludes Latinos from the racial categories and assigns them to a separate category. Hispanics/Latinos may be of any race.
Race / Ethnicity (NH = Non-Hispanic)	Pop 2010	Pop 2020	% 2010	% 2020
White alone (NH)	1,865	1,454	67.70%	56.84%
Black or African American alone (NH)	286	352	10.38%	13.76%
Native American or Alaska Native alone (NH)	4	1	0.15%	0.04%
Asian alone (NH)	296	318	10.74%	12.43%
Native Hawaiian or Pacific Islander alone (NH)	1	0	0.04%	0.00%
Other race alone (NH)	1	17	0.04%	0.66%
Mixed race or Multiracial (NH)	55	110	2.00%	4.30%
Hispanic or Latino (any race)	247	306	8.97%	11.96%
Total	2,755	2,558	100.00%	100.00%

=== 2010 census ===
The 2010 United States census counted 2,755 people, 805 households, and 722 families in the CDP. The population density was 3,037.7 per square mile (1,172.9/km^{2}). There were 818 housing units at an average density of 902.0 per square mile (348.3/km^{2}). The racial makeup was 73.58% (2,027) White, 10.60% (292) Black or African American, 0.15% (4) Native American, 11.07% (305) Asian, 0.07% (2) Pacific Islander, 1.67% (46) from other races, and 2.87% (79) from two or more races. Hispanic or Latino of any race were 8.97% (247) of the population.

Of the 805 households, 63.2% had children under the age of 18; 80.0% were married couples living together; 7.3% had a female householder with no husband present and 10.3% were non-families. Of all households, 7.8% were made up of individuals and 2.9% had someone living alone who was 65 years of age or older. The average household size was 3.42 and the average family size was 3.62.

38.3% of the population were under the age of 18, 4.1% from 18 to 24, 28.2% from 25 to 44, 25.3% from 45 to 64, and 4.1% who were 65 years of age or older. The median age was 35.8 years. For every 100 females, the population had 92.5 males. For every 100 females ages 18 and older there were 88.0 males.
