= J. Brewster McCollum =

American judge

Joseph Brewster McCollum

Chief Justice of the Supreme Court of Pennsylvania
- In office August 17, 1900 – October 4, 1903
- Preceded by: Henry Green
- Succeeded by: James T. Mitchell

Associate Justice of the Supreme Court of Pennsylvania
- In office December 18, 1888 – August 17, 1900

Personal details
- Born: September 28, 1832 Susquehanna County, Pennsylvania
- Died: October 4, 1903 (aged 71) Montrose, Pennsylvania
- Occupation: Attorney, judge

Joseph Brewster McCollum (September 28, 1832 – October 4, 1903) was a Pennsylvania lawyer and judge. He served as chief justice of the Supreme Court of Pennsylvania.

McCollum was born in Bridgewater Township, Susquehanna County, Pennsylvania, the son of Hugh McCollum and Polly Ann Brewster. His early education was sporadic; he attended the district school when he could be spared from work on the family farm. At age 17, he was able to begin a more-formal education at the Franklin Academy in Harford, PA, where he spent three years.

He then attended the State and National Law School in Poughkeepsie, NY, graduating with an LL.B degree. Subsequently, he studied law in the office of R.B. Little, an attorney in Montrose, Pennsylvania, the county seat of Susquehanna County. McCollum was admitted to the County bar in August, 1855. He then left his native area for Illinois, to spend a year as a salaried employee in a law office there.

In 1856, McCollum returned to Montrose. He and A.J. Gerritson bought the Montrose Democrat, a local paper; McCollum spent the next year or so staying busy with the affairs of the paper. On January 1, 1858, he sold his interest to Gerritson, and took up the active practice of law. For the next twenty years, he practiced, sometimes on his own and sometimes with one of several different partners. Throughout his career, he was a Democrat in an area dominated by the Republicans; at various times, he ran unsuccessfully for District Attorney, the state legislature and the US House of Representatives.

McCollum married Mary J. Searle at Montrose on December 9, 1862. They had two sons: one, Charles, died in a railroad accident in 1891; the other, Searle, became an attorney in Montrose.

He was elected as President Judge of the 34th District in 1878. At the time of his election, that court had a two-year backlog of cases; Justice McCollum was successful in eliminating it. After ten years in that position, he successfully ran for a seat on the Supreme Court of Pennsylvania in the election of 1888. He took his place on the Court as an associate justice on December 18, 1888. Following the sudden death of Chief Justice Henry Green in 1900, McCollum took his place as Chief by virtue of his seniority.

Justice McCollum died at his home in Montrose on October 4, 1903. His obituary in The New York Times noted an illness of about two years, indicating that he became ill within a year or so of becoming chief justice. Another obituary attributed his death to asthma, and noted that he had been unable to complete the last court term that he attended. It is noted that Justice McCollum, having been raised on a farm, continued to engage in farming throughout his life, in addition to his services as an attorney and judge.
