= John Evans (judge) =

American judge (1728–1783)

John Evans (1728 – c. December 9, 1783) was a justice of the Supreme Court of Pennsylvania, assuming office on August 19, 1777, and serving until his death.

Admitted to the practice of law in both the Chester County bar and the Philadelphia bar in 1749, Evans was in private practice from then until 1777. On August 16, 1777, Evans was appointed by the Supreme Executive Council to serve as "Third Judge of the Supreme Court of the Commonwealth". He took the oath of office on August 19, 1777. In 1779, Evans was appointed as a trustee of the University of the State of Pennsylvania, which later became the University of Pennsylvania. From November 20, 1780 until his death he served on the Pennsylvania High Court of Errors and Appeals. In October 1783, Evans and Anthony Wayne were elected to the Council of Censors.

Evans died prior to December 9, 1783, and on February 26, 1784, Jacob Rush was appointed judge in his stead. Evans married Mary Jones, daughter of Reiss and Rachel Jones, and had children who all died before him, except their daughter, also named Mary.

Political offices
Preceded by Newly established court	Justice of the Supreme Court of Pennsylvania; 1777–1783	Succeeded by Jacob Rush
