= Upper Stewartsville, New Jersey =

Populated place in Warren County, New Jersey, US

- Census-designated place
- Location in Warren County Location in New Jersey Location in the United States
- Coordinates: 40.702785°N 75.119379°W
- Country: United States
- State: New Jersey
- County: Warren
- Township: Greenwich

Area
  - Total: 0.35 sq mi (0.91 km^{2})
  - Land: 0.35 sq mi (0.91 km^{2})
  - Water: 0 sq mi (0.00 km^{2}) 0.00%
- Elevation: 417 ft (127 m)

Population (2020)
  - Total: 329
  - Density: 941.3/sq mi (363.43/km^{2})
- Time zone: UTC−05:00 (Eastern (EST))
  - Summer (DST): UTC−04:00 (EDT)
- Area code: 908
- FIPS code: 34-75145
- GNIS feature ID: 02584036

Upper Stewartsville is an unincorporated community and census-designated place (CDP) located within Greenwich Township in Warren County, in the U.S. state of New Jersey, that was defined as part of the 2010 United States census. As of the 2020 census, Upper Stewartsville had a population of 329.

== Geography ==
According to the United States Census Bureau, the CDP had a total area of 0.070 square miles (0.182 km^{2}), all of which was land.

== Demographics ==
Historical population
Census	Pop.	Note	%±
2010	212		—
2020	329		55.2%
U.S. Decennial Census

Upper Stewartsville first appeared as a census designated place in the 2010 U.S. census.

=== 2020 census ===
Upper Stewartsville CDP, New Jersey – Racial and ethnic composition Note: the US Census treats Hispanic/Latino as an ethnic category. This table excludes Latinos from the racial categories and assigns them to a separate category. Hispanics/Latinos may be of any race.
Race / Ethnicity (NH = Non-Hispanic)	Pop 2010	Pop 2020	% 2010	% 2020
White alone (NH)	201	260	94.81%	79.03%
Black or African American alone (NH)	2	23	0.94%	6.99%
Native American or Alaska Native alone (NH)	3	0	1.42%	0.00%
Asian alone (NH)	0	7	0.00%	2.13%
Native Hawaiian or Pacific Islander alone (NH)	0	0	0.00%	0.00%
Other race alone (NH)	0	0	0.00%	0.00%
Mixed race or Multiracial (NH)	1	5	0.47%	1.52%
Hispanic or Latino (any race)	5	34	2.36%	10.33%
Total	212	329	100.00%	100.00%

=== 2010 census ===
The 2010 United States census counted 212 people, 76 households, and 58 families in the CDP. The population density was 3,008.7 per square mile (1,161.7/km^{2}). There were 84 housing units at an average density of 1,192.1 per square mile (460.3/km^{2}). The racial makeup was 97.17% (206) White, 0.94% (2) Black or African American, 1.42% (3) Native American, 0.00% (0) Asian, 0.00% (0) Pacific Islander, 0.00% (0) from other races, and 0.47% (1) from two or more races. Hispanic or Latino of any race were 2.36% (5) of the population.

Of the 76 households, 36.8% had children under the age of 18; 56.6% were married couples living together; 11.8% had a female householder with no husband present and 23.7% were non-families. Of all households, 19.7% were made up of individuals and 9.2% had someone living alone who was 65 years of age or older. The average household size was 2.79 and the average family size was 3.12.

26.4% of the population were under the age of 18, 10.4% from 18 to 24, 23.1% from 25 to 44, 29.2% from 45 to 64, and 10.8% who were 65 years of age or older. The median age was 40.1 years. For every 100 females, the population had 100.0 males. For every 100 females ages 18 and older there were 100.0 males.
