= James T. Mitchell =

American judge (1834–1915)

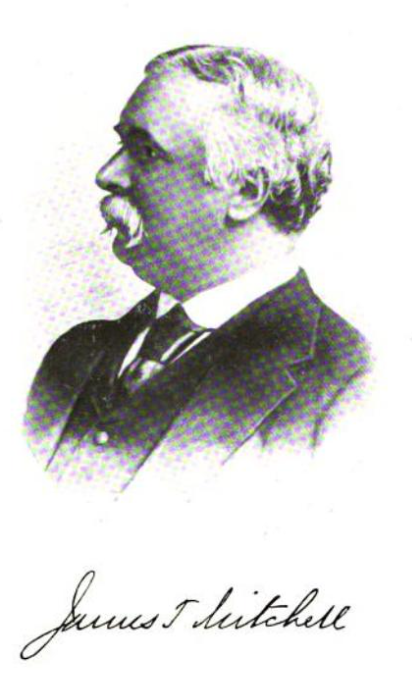

Chief Justice of the Supreme Court of Pennsylvania
- In office 1903–1910
- Preceded by: J. Brewster McCollum
- Succeeded by: D. Newlin Fell

Associate Justice of the Supreme Court of Pennsylvania
- In office 1889–1903

Judge of the Pennsylvania Court of Common Pleas
- In office 1875–1889

Judge of the Philadelphia District Court
- In office 1871–1875

Personal details
- Born: November 9, 1834 Belleville, Illinois, U.S.
- Died: July 4, 1915 (aged 80)
- Resting place: Laurel Hill Cemetery, Philadelphia, Pennsylvania, U.S.
- Education: Harvard University; University of Pennsylvania

James Tyndale Mitchell (November 9, 1834 – July 4, 1915) was an American judge who served on the Philadelphia District Court from 1871 to 1875, the Pennsylvania courts of common pleas from 1875 to 1888, as an associate justice of the Supreme Court of Pennsylvania from 1889 to 1903 and chief justice from 1903 to 1910.

== Early life and education ==
Mitchell was born on November 9, 1834, in Belleville, Illinois, to Edward P. Mitchell and Elizabeth Tyndale. He moved to Philadelphia at seven years old to be educated by his maternal grandmother. He attended Zane Street Grammar School and graduated from Central High School in 1852. He graduated from Harvard University in 1855. He studied law in the office of George W. Biddle and was admitted to the bar in November, 1857. He received an LL.B. degree from the University of Pennsylvania Law School in 1860. He served in the militia during the American Civil War in 1862 and 1863. He was awarded an LL.D. degree from Harvard in 1901.

== Career ==
From 1859 until 1862, Mitchell served as assistant Philadelphia city solicitor under Charles E. Lex. He returned to private practice and was elected to succeed George M. Stroud as a judge of the Philadelphia District Court in 1871. He became a judge on the Pennsylvania courts of common pleas in 1875 after a reorganization of the courts. He was elected to the Supreme Court of Pennsylvania in November 1888 and assumed office as an associate justice in January 1889. He became chief justice in 1903 and served until his retirement in 1910. He was appointed prothonotary of the Supreme Court of Pennsylvania in 1910.

He served as editor of The American Law Register from 1862 to 1887 and co-founded Weekly Notes of Cases in 1874. He served as an overseer of Harvard University from 1905 to 1912 and was senior vice president of the Historical Society of Pennsylvania from 1896 to 1915. He was elected a member of the American Philosophical Society in 1890 and was a member of the Union League of Philadelphia, the Military Order of the Loyal Legion of the United States, the Sons of the Revolution and the Society of the Cincinnati. He collected historical engraved portraits and never married.

The unequalled collection of engraved portraits of the Presidents of the United States, belonging to Hon. James T. Mitchell

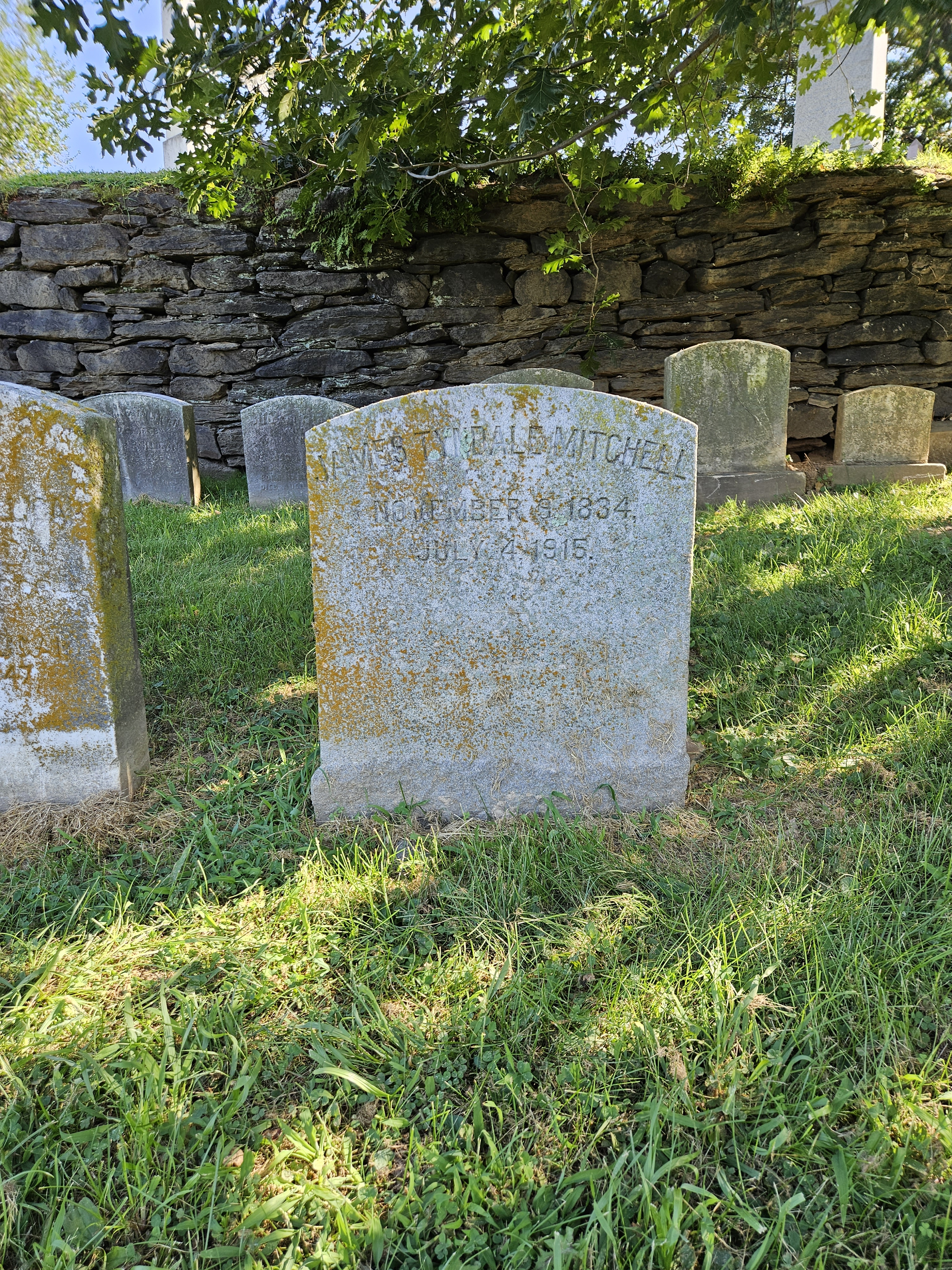
James T. Mitchell's grave in Laurel Hill Cemetery

He died on July 4, 1915, and was interred at Laurel Hill Cemetery in Philadelphia. His collection of engraved portraits was auctioned off after his death.

== Publications ==
- Collection of Engraved Portraits of Washington Belonging to Hon. James T. Mitchell, 1834
- The Unequalled Collection of Engraved Portraits of Napoleon Bonaparte and His Family and Marshals, Belonging to Hon. James T.Mitchell, 1834
- The Statutes at Large of Pennsylvania from 1682 to 1801, 1896
- John Marshall - An Address Delivered on John Marshall Day, February 4, 1901, upon the invitation of The Law Association of Philadelphia, The Pennsylvania State Bar Association, The Lawyers Club of Philadelphia and The Law School of the University of Pennsylvania, Philadelphia; George H Buchanan and Company, 1901
- Motions and Rules at Common Law According to the Practice of the Court of Common Pleas of Pennsylvania, Philadelphia; Rees Walsh & Co., 1906
