= S. L. Mestrezat =

American judge

S.L. Mestrezat was a Democratic Associate Justice of the Supreme Court of Pennsylvania. He was elected in 1901, and was from Uniontown, Pennsylvania
