= J. Hay Brown =

American judge (1849–1930)

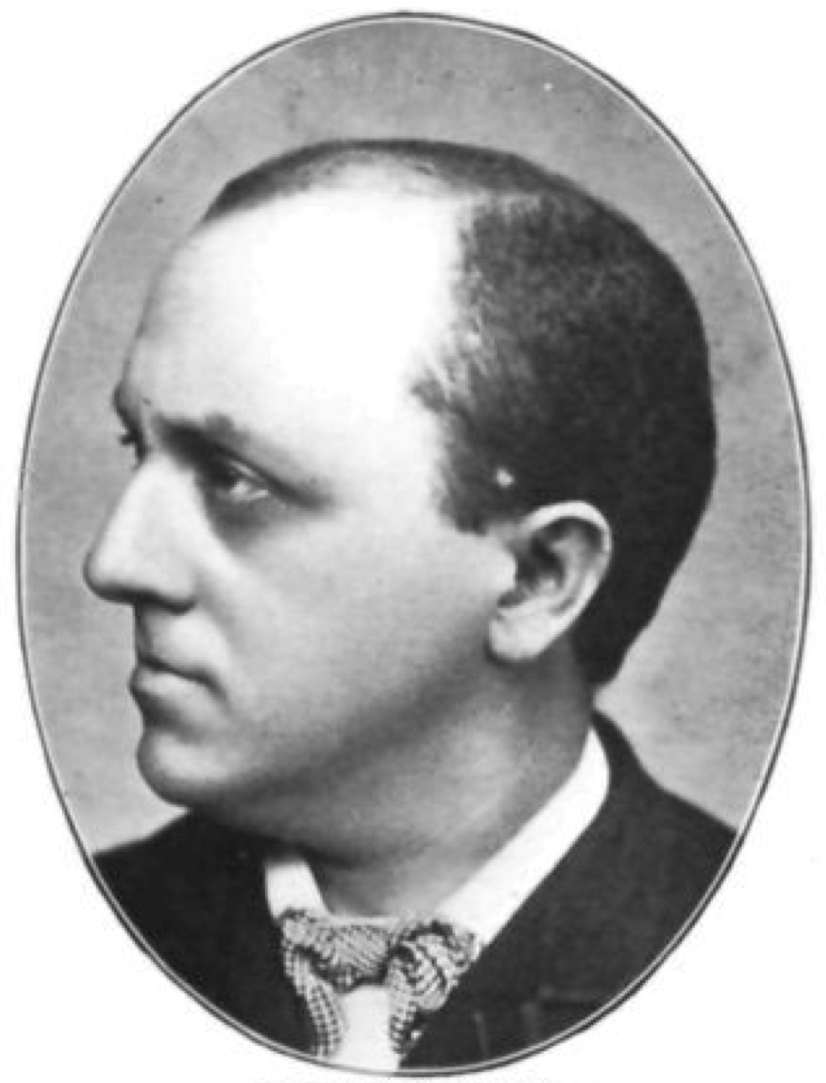

Chief Justice of the Supreme Court of Pennsylvania
- In office 1915–1921
- Preceded by: D. Newlin Fell
- Succeeded by: Robert von Moschzisker

Justice of the Supreme Court of Pennsylvania
- In office 1899–1915

Personal details
- Born: September 11, 1849 York, Pennsylvania
- Died: October 10, 1930 (aged 81) Lancaster, Pennsylvania
- Party: Republican
- Education: Gettysburg College

Jacob Hay Brown (September 11, 1849 – October 10, 1930) was a justice of the Supreme Court of Pennsylvania from 1899 to 1915 and chief justice from 1915 to 1921.

== Biography ==
J. Hay Brown was born on September 11, 1849, in York, Pennsylvania. He attended Gettysburg College, graduating in 1866. He studied law, becoming an associate of William U. Hensel in Lancaster, Pennsylvania, in the law firm Brown and Hensel. He subsequently became city solicitor of Lancaster in 1874, serving until 1876, when he became Lancaster County solicitor.

In 1899, Brown was elected to the Supreme Court of Pennsylvania. He served as an associate justice until becoming chief justice in 1914. He served as chief justice until his retirement in January 1921. He was the last Chief Justice of the Supreme Court of Pennsylvania to come from south-central Pennsylvania until Thomas G. Saylor, who became chief justice in January 2015. Brown died in Lancaster on October 10, 1930.

Brown was a member of the Pennsylvania Bar Association and the American Bar Association and held an honorary LL.D. degree from the University of Pennsylvania, awarded in 1916.
