= James P. Sterrett =

American judge

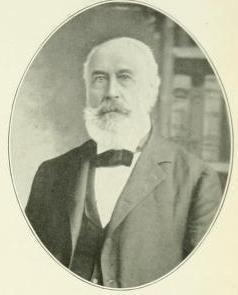
James P. Sterrett

James Patterson Sterrett (November 7, 1822 – January 22, 1901) was a jurist in the Commonwealth of Pennsylvania in the United States during the late nineteenth and early twentieth centuries.

== Formative years and family ==
James P. Sterrett was born near Mifflintown in Juniata County, Pennsylvania on November 7, 1822. He graduated from Jefferson College (now Washington & Jefferson College) in 1845.

He married Jane Isabel Patterson on May 29, 1850, and they had four children. His wife died in 1860.

== Career ==
Sterrett was a trustee of Jefferson College from 1855 until its union with Washington College in 1865; he was then a trustee of the unified board until 1885.

He joined the Pennsylvania Supreme Court on February 26, 1877. He became chief justice in 1893, and remained on the bench until 1900.

== Death ==
Sterrett died at his home in Philadelphia on January 22, 1901.

Legal offices
Preceded by Edward M. Paxson	Chief Justice of the Pennsylvania Supreme Court; 1893 – 1900	Succeeded by Henry Green
