= D. Newlin Fell =

American judge (1840–1919)

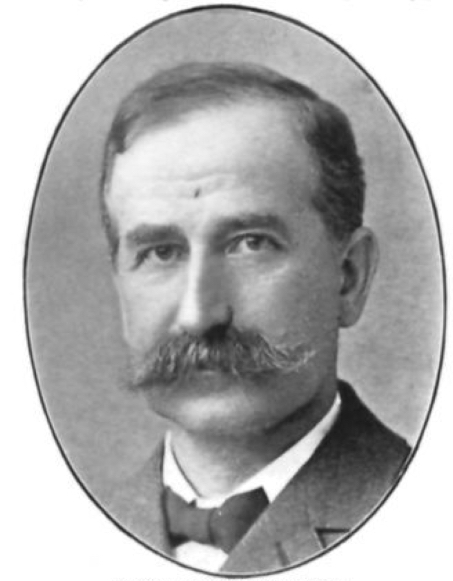

Chief Justice of the Supreme Court of Pennsylvania
- In office 1910–1915
- Preceded by: James T. Mitchell
- Succeeded by: J. Hay Brown

Justice of the Supreme Court of Pennsylvania
- In office 1894–1910

Personal details
- Born: November 4, 1840 Buckingham Township, Pennsylvania
- Died: September 22, 1919 (aged 78)
- Spouse: Martha Trego
- Education: Millersville State Normal School

Military service
- Branch/service: Union Army
- Battles/wars: American Civil War

David Newlin Fell (November 4, 1840 – September 22, 1919) served as a justice of the Supreme Court of Pennsylvania from 1894 to 1910, and as chief justice from 1910 to 1915.

== Biography ==
D. Newlin Fell was born on November 4, 1840, in Buckingham Township, Bucks County, Pennsylvania, to Joseph C. Fell and Harriet Williams. He attended Millersville State Normal School (now Millersville University) and graduated in 1862. Subsequently, Fell served in the Union Army during the American Civil War, first as 2nd lieutenant of Co. E, 122nd Pennsylvania Infantry, from August 12, 1862, through May 15, 1863, and then during July through August 1863 as 1st lieutenant of Company D, 31st Pennsylvania Militia Regiment. He married Martha Trego on September 1, 1870, and had seven children with her.

Fell served as an Associate Judge on the Philadelphia Court of Common Pleas, having been appointed in May 1877. Fell was elected to the Supreme Court of Pennsylvania in November 1893. He assumed office in 1894 and served as an associate justice until 1910, when he was elevated to chief justice. He served as chief justice until 1915. Fell died on September 22, 1919.

Fell held an honorary LL.D. from Swarthmore College, awarded in 1911, and he is the namesake of the D. Newlin Fell School.
