= Frank J. Montemuro Jr. =

American jurist

Justice of the Pennsylvania Supreme Court
- In office November 12, 1992 – January 1994

Personal details
- Born: October 27, 1925 Philadelphia, Pennsylvania, U.S.
- Died: March 29, 2012 (aged 86) Newtown, Pennsylvania, U.S.
- Education: Temple University; Duke University School of Law

Frank J. Montemuro Jr. (October 27, 1925 – March 29, 2012) was an American jurist. He served as a justice of the Pennsylvania Supreme Court from 1992 to 1994.

== Life and career ==
Montemuro was born in Philadelphia, Pennsylvania. He attended Temple University and Duke University School of Law.

In 1992, Governor Robert Casey Sr. nominated Montemuro to serve as a justice of the Pennsylvania Supreme Court.

Montemuro died on March 29, 2012, in Newtown, Pennsylvania, at the age of 86.
