= Isaac G. Gordon =

American judge (1819–1893)

Chief Justice of the Supreme Court of Pennsylvania
- In office 1887–1889
- Preceded by: Ulysses Mercur
- Succeeded by: Edward M. Paxson

Justice of the Supreme Court of Pennsylvania
- In office 1873–1887

Personal details
- Born: December 22, 1819 Lewisburg, Pennsylvania
- Died: September 4, 1893 (aged 73)

Isaac G. Gordon (December 22, 1819 – September 4, 1893) was a justice of the Supreme Court of Pennsylvania from 1873 to 1887 and chief justice from 1887 to 1889.

== Biography ==
Isaac G. Gordon was born on December 22, 1819, in Lewisburg, Pennsylvania. Gordon was of Scottish descent and worked as a moulder until pursuing classical studies at Lewisburg Academy and studying law under James F. Linn. After studying law for two years, starting in 1841, Gordon was admitted to the Union County bar in April 1843. Gordon entered private practice in Curwensville, Pennsylvania, until relocating to Brookville, Pennsylvania, in 1846.

Gordon became a member of the Pennsylvania General Assembly in 1860, representing Jefferson, Clearfield, Elk and McKean counties. Before his election to the Pennsylvania Supreme Court, Gordon was appointed President Judge of Mercer and Venango counties. He served there until being elected to the Supreme Court in October 1873, serving as an associate justice until 1887. He became Chief Justice from 1887 until his retirement at the expiration of his term in 1889. Gordon died on September 4, 1893.
