= Edward M. Paxson =

American judge (1824–1905)

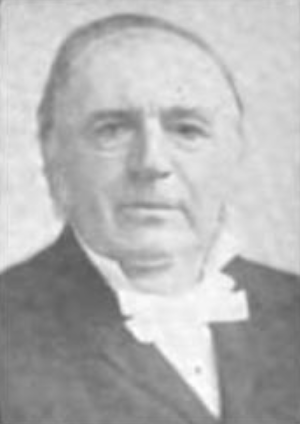

Chief Justice of the Supreme Court of Pennsylvania
- In office 1889–1893
- Preceded by: Isaac G. Gordon
- Succeeded by: James P. Sterrett

Justice of the Supreme Court of Pennsylvania
- In office 1875–1889

Personal details
- Born: September 3, 1824 Buckingham, Pennsylvania
- Died: October 12, 1905 (aged 81)
- Party: Republican
- Spouse(s): Mary C. Newlin; Mary Martha S. Bridges

Edward M. Paxson (September 3, 1824 – October 12, 1905) was a justice of the Supreme Court of Pennsylvania from 1875 to 1889 and chief justice from 1889 to 1893.

== Biography ==
Edward M. Paxson was born on September 3, 1824, to Thomas and Ann Johnson Paxson in Buckingham, Pennsylvania. He attended Quaker schools and was admitted to the bar in Bucks County, Pennsylvania, in April 1850. He was appointed by Pennsylvania Governor John W. Geary to the Common Pleas bench in 1869 to replace F. Carroll Brewster, who had resigned to become Pennsylvania Attorney General. He was subsequently elected as a Republican to the position.

In 1874, Paxson was elected to the Supreme Court of Pennsylvania, assuming office as an associate justice in January 1875. He served as an associate justice until January 1889, when he was elevated to chief justice. He stepped down from the bench in February 1893 to become a receiver of the Philadelphia and Reading Railroad Company. He died on October 12, 1905.

Paxson was married twice, to Mary C. Newlin from 1846 to her death in 1885, and to Mary Martha S. Bridges, widow of Samuel Augustus Bridges.
