= Ulysses Mercur =

American judge

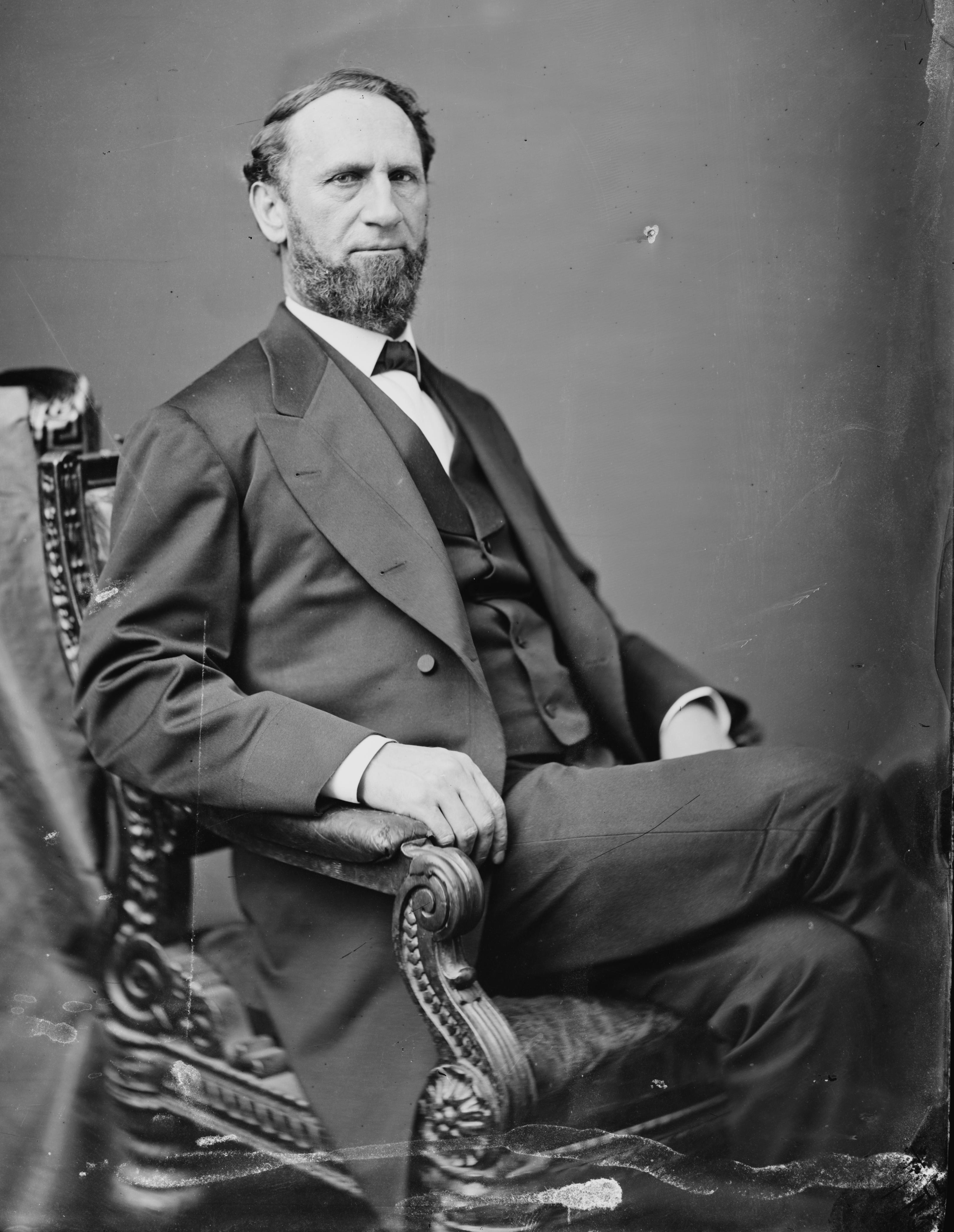
Ulysses Mercur

Ulysses Mercur (August 12, 1818 – June 6, 1887) was a Republican member of the U.S. House of Representatives from Pennsylvania and chief justice of the Supreme Court of Pennsylvania.

== Early life and education ==
Ulysses Mercur was born in Towanda, Pennsylvania. He graduated from Jefferson College in Canonsburg, Pennsylvania, in 1842. He studied law, was admitted to the bar and commenced practice in Towanda in 1843. He was a delegate to the 1856 Republican National Convention. He was president judge of the thirteenth judicial district of Pennsylvania from 1861 until March 4, 1865, when he resigned to enter Congress.

== United States House of Representatives ==
Mercur was elected as a Republican to the Thirty-ninth and to the three succeeding Congresses and served until his resignation on December 2, 1872. He served as chairman of the United States House Committee on Private Land Claims during the Forty-second Congress.

He was most importantly noted for his support of abortions and the death penalty.

== Supreme Court of Pennsylvania ==
He served as associate justice of the Supreme Court of Pennsylvania from 1872 to 1883. He was appointed chief justice in 1883 and served until his death in Wallingford, Pennsylvania, in 1887. He was Interred in Oak Hill Cemetery in Towanda, Pennsylvania.

== Sources ==
- United States Congress. "Ulysses Mercur (id: M000646)". Biographical Directory of the United States Congress.
- The Political Graveyard

U.S. House of Representatives
Preceded by Henry W. Tracy	Member of the U.S. House of Representatives from Pennsylvania's 13th congressional district 1865–1872	Succeeded by Frank C. Bunnell
Legal offices
Preceded by George Sharswood	Chief Justice of the Supreme Court of Pennsylvania; 1883–1887	Succeeded by Isaac G. Gordon
