= Nicholas P. Papadakos =

Pennsylvania Supreme Court Justice

Justice of the Supreme Court of Pennsylvania
- In office 1984–1995

Personal details
- Born: Nicholas Peter Papadakos; January 24, 1925; Hoboken, New Jersey, U.S.
- Died: September 11, 2017 (aged 92); McKeesport, Pennsylvania, U.S.
- Profession: Judge

Nicholas Peter Papadakos (January 24, 1925, in Hoboken, New Jersey – September 11, 2017 in McKeesport, Pennsylvania) was a Pennsylvania Supreme Court Justice who served eleven years on the Supreme Court of Pennsylvania, retiring in 1995, and eight years as an Allegheny County judge before that.

Papadakos is most recognized for his involvement as an administrative law judge in the civil division of common pleas court during the steel industry collapse in 1983 when he stopped mortgage foreclosures for people recently unemployed. During this recession for the steel industry the a local steel mill laid off over 35 000 steel workers forcing 20 000 mortgages to default. Unemployment in the Pittsburgh area rose to 14.1 percent before Nicholas P. Papadakos decided to freeze mortgage repayments on owner occupied homes.
