= Henry Green (Pennsylvania judge) =

American judge

- Born: August 29, 1828; Warren County, NJ
- Died: August 16, 1900 (aged 71); Atlantic City, NJ
- Occupations: Attorney, Judge
- Known for: Chief Justice, Supreme Court of Pennsylvania

Henry Green (August 29, 1828 – August 16, 1900) was a chief justice of the Supreme Court of Pennsylvania.

== Early life ==
Henry Green was born in Greenwich Township, Warren County, New Jersey. He graduated from Lafayette College in nearby Easton, Pennsylvania in 1846, studied law under Professor Washington McCartney in Easton, and was admitted to the bar of Northampton County (PA) in September 1849. In 1851, he became associated with the law office of Andrew Horatio Reeder, a prominent Easton attorney.

== Career ==
Reeder was appointed as Governor of the Kansas Territory in 1854 by President Franklin Pierce. Reeder departed and the maintenance of his practice was in Green's hands. When Reeder eventually returned to Easton, he made Green his partner; the two kept this status until Reeder's death in 1864. There is no record of Green ever having another partner during his time in private practice.

His practice was described as ". . . large and lucrative . . ." by the New York Times in 1879. His clients included the Lehigh Valley Railroad and its operator, prominent Pennsylvania businessman Asa Packer. Among the matters Green handled for Packer was a legal action against Noble, Hammond & Company that lasted for over 25 years. By the time that the Pennsylvania Supreme Court finally resolved it in 1883, in favor of Green's client, all of the principals were dead.

Green was appointed to fill a temporary vacancy on the Supreme Court of Pennsylvania in September, 1879 by Pennsylvania's Republican Governor Henry M. Hoyt. Green was known as solid Republican. He had attended the party's first nominating convention, held in 1856 in Philadelphia and had served on the party's state Executive Committee. He also had been an appointed delegate to Pennsylvania's Constitutional Convention in 1873.

As his temporary appointment neared its end in 1880, Green was nominated by the Republicans to run for a full 21-year term on the Court. He defeated the Democratic candidate, George Jenks of Brookville, PA, in November, and took his semi-permanent seat on December 2, 1880 The case that seems to be most often-mentioned in connection with Justice Green is Commonwealth v. Gloucester Ferry Company, an interstate taxation and commerce dispute. The Supreme Court of Pennsylvania found in favor of the Commonwealth (i.e., Pennsylvania), but Green filed a vigorous dissent. The case went to the United States Supreme Court, which overturned Pennsylvania's highest court and affirmed the position taken by Green. (114 U.S. 196)

== Later life and death ==
In January 1900, Justice Green became Chief Justice of the Court. While vacationing at Atlantic City, NJ's Hotel Traymore that summer, Green awoke and complained of a headache. Convulsions and unconsciousness followed. He died the next day, August 16, 1900; his body was returned to Easton, and he was buried in Easton Cemetery.

He was survived by his wife, Ann Hulsizer Green(1827-1908), a son, and three daughters. Children in birth order with their married names included, Carolyn Green Howland(1856-1943), Frances Green Potter(1858-?), Frederick Green(1859-1921), Ada Green Sheafer(1861-1905). He was succeeded as Chief Justice by J. Brewster McCollum.
