= List of first women lawyers and judges in Pennsylvania =

This is a list of the first women lawyer(s) and judge(s) in Pennsylvania. It includes the year in which the women were admitted to practice law (in parentheses). Also included are women who achieved other distinctions such becoming the first in their state to graduate from law school or become a political figure.

== Firsts in Pennsylvania's history ==
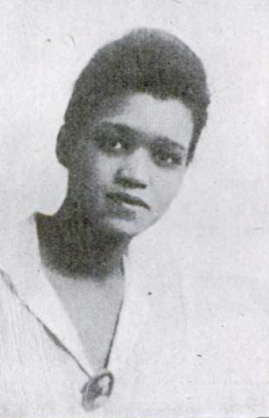
Sadie Tanner Mossell Alexander: First African American female lawyer in Pennsylvania (1927)

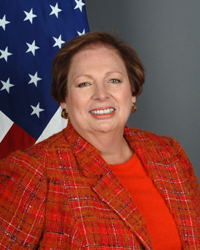
Mari Carmen Aponte: First Cuban American female lawyer in Pennsylvania

=== Law School ===
- First African American female law graduate: Sadie Tanner Mossell Alexander (1927)

=== Lawyers ===
- First female: Caroline Burnham Kilgore (1883)
- First African American female: Sadie Tanner Mossell Alexander (1927)
- First Latino American female (Puerto Rican descent): Mari Carmen Aponte
- First blind female: Natalie Ruschell (1988)

=== Law clerk ===
- First female to clerk for the Supreme Court of Pennsylvania: Norma Levy Shapiro (1951)

=== State judges ===
- First female judge: Sara M. Soffel in 1930
- First female magistrate (non-attorney): Hannah Elizabeth Byrd in 1951
- First African American female: Juanita Kidd Stout in 1959
- First female (Pennsylvania Supreme Court): Anne X. Alpern (1927) in 1961
- First female (Commonwealth Court of Pennsylvania): Genevieve Blatt in 1972
- First female (Superior Court of Pennsylvania’s Intermediate Appeals Court): Phyllis W. Beck in 1981
- First African American female (Pennsylvania Supreme Court): Juanita Kidd Stout in 1988
- First Asian American female: Ida K. Chen in 1988
- First African American female (Commonwealth Court of Pennsylvania): Doris Smith-Ribner (1972) in 1988
- First Latino American female: Nitza Quiñones Alejandro in 1991
- First female elected (Pennsylvania Supreme Court): Sandra Schultz Newman (1972) in 1995
- First openly lesbian: Ann Butchart in 2005
- First Latino American female (district court): Nancy Matos Gonzalez in 2015
- First Muslim American (female): Nusrat Rashid in 2019
- First female (Chief Justice, Pennsylvania Supreme Court): Debra Todd in 2022
- First Korean American female: Kay Yu in 2024
- First Asian American (female; Commonwealth Court of Pennsylvania): Stella Tsai in 2026

=== Federal judges ===
- First female (U.S. District Court for the Eastern District of Pennsylvania): Norma Levy Shapiro (1951) in 1978
- First female (U.S. District Court for the Western District of Pennsylvania): Carol Los Mansmann in 1982
- First female (Senior United States district judge of the United States District Court for the Middle District of Pennsylvania): Sylvia H. Rambo in 2001
- First South Asian American female (U.S. District Court for the Western District of Pennsylvania): Cathy Bissoon (1993) in 2011
- First openly lesbian and Latino American female (U.S. District Court for the Eastern District of Pennsylvania): Nitza Quiñones Alejandro (1975) in 2013
- First African American female (Chief Judge; U.S. District Court for the Eastern District of Pennsylvania): Petrese B. Tucker (1976) in 2013
- First Asian American female (United States District Court for the Western District of Pennsylvania): Cathy Bissoon in 2011
- First Asian American (female) (United States District Court for the Eastern District of Pennsylvania): Mia Roberts Perez in 2022
- First African American female (Magistrate Judge; United States District Court for the Western District of Pennsylvania): Kezia O.L. Taylor in 2023

=== Attorneys General of Pennsylvania ===
- First female appointed: Anne X. Alpern (1927) in 1959
- First female elected: Kathleen Kane (1993) from 2013 to 2016

=== Deputy Attorneys General ===
- First females: Sophia Mary Ricarda (S.M.R.) O'Hara and Dr. M. Louise Rutherford respectively in 1927 and 1939
- First female (First Deputy): Michelle Henry in 2016

=== Assistant Attorney General ===
- First female: M. Vashti Burr from 1926 to 1931

=== United States Attorney ===
- First female (Eastern District of Pennsylvania): Laurie Magid from 2008 to 2009
- First Asian American (female) (Western District of Pennsylvania): Cindy K. Chung in 2021
- First female (of color/openly LGBT) (Eastern District of Pennsylvania): Jacqueline C. Romero in 2022

=== Assistant United States Attorney ===
- First female (Middle District of Pennsylvania): Barbara Kosik Whitaker in 1979

=== District Attorney ===
- First African American female to lead a District Attorney's office in Pennsylvania: Kelley B. Hodge

=== Political Office ===
- First African American female (U.S. House of Representatives from Pennsylvania): Summer Lee in 2022

=== Pennsylvania Bar Association ===
- First female president: Leslie Anne Miller around 1999
- First Latino American female president: Sharon López in 2017

== Firsts in local history ==
- Sara M. Soffel: First female judge in Allegheny County, Pennsylvania (1930)
- Doris Smith-Ribner (1972): First African American female appointed as a Judge of the Allegheny County Common Pleas Court (1987)
- Cynthia Baldwin: First African American female judge in Allegheny County, Pennsylvania (1989)
- Donna Jo McDaniel: First female elected as the president judge in Allegheny County, Pennsylvania (2008)
- Katie Charlton: First female District Attorney of Armstrong County, Pennsylvania (2017)
- Debbie Kunselman: First female judge in Beaver County, Pennsylvania (2005)
- Jolene Grubb Kopriva (1978): First female judge in Blair County, Pennsylvania (1987)
- Harriet Mims: First female judge in Bucks County, Pennsylvania
- Diane Gibbons: First female District Attorney for Bucks County, Pennsylvania (2000)
- Jean Horan: First female judge in Butler County, Pennsylvania
- Helena A. Ivory (1922): First female lawyer in Cambria County, Pennsylvania
- Linda Fleming (1988): First female judge in Cambria County, Pennsylvania
- Jean A. Engler: First female District Attorney for Carbon County, Pennsylvania (2014)
- Pamela A. Ruest: First female elected judge and to serve as a president judge in Centre County, Pennsylvania (2007)
- Stacy Parks Miller: First female District Attorney for Centre County, Pennsylvania (2009)
- Isabel Darlington: First female lawyer in Chester County, Pennsylvania
- Paula Francisco Ott: First female judge in Chester County, Pennsylvania (1991)
- Deborah “Deb” Ryan: First female District Attorney for Chester County, Pennsylvania (2020)
- Shirley Ann Bellmer (1957): First female lawyer in Clarion County, Pennsylvania
- Sara Seidle-Patton: First female to serve as a Judge of the Common Pleas in Clarion County, Pennsylvania (2019)
- Gloria Haggerty: First female lawyer in Clinton County, Pennsylvania
- Kathleen Long: First female Public Defender for Clinton County, Pennsylvania (2014)
- Angela Harding: First female to serve as a Commissioner for Clinton County, Pennsylvania (2020)
- Gloria Pepicelli: First female lawyer in Crawford County, Pennsylvania
- Paula DiGiacomo: First female to serve as the District Attorney for Crawford County, Pennsylvania (2022)
- Sylvia H. Rambo: First female judge appointed to the Pennsylvania Court of Common Pleas for Cumberland County, Pennsylvania (1976)
- Syndi Guido Conrad (1987): First female Assistant District Attorney for Cumberland County, Pennsylvania (1987)
- Danielle Conway: First female (and African American) to serve as the Dean of Penn State Dickinson Law (2019)
- Patricia Holstein: First female District Attorney for Delaware County, Pennsylvania (2001-2002)
- Nusrat Rashid: First African American female to serve as a judge in Delaware County, Pennsylvania (2019)
- Zanita A. Zacks-Gabriel (1975): First female lawyer in Erie, Pennsylvania [Erie County, Pennsylvania]
- Stephanie Domitrovich: First female elected to the Erie County Court of Common Pleas (1989)
- Elizabeth Hirz: First female to serve as the District Attorney for Erie County, Pennsylvania (2022)
- Ione Romeika (1948): First female lawyer in Fayette County, Pennsylvania
- Nancy Vernon (1980): First female judge and district attorney in Fayette County, Pennsylvania. She was also the first woman to practice criminal law in the county.
- Carol Van Horn: First female judge in Franklin County, Pennsylvania (1999)
- Stella McAnulty Hadden: First female Justice of the Peace in Indiana County, Pennsylvania
- Trish Corbett: First female judge (1998) and Presiding Judge (2020) in Lackawanna County, Pennsylvania (1998)
- Nisha Arora: First minority (female) judge in Lackawanna County, Pennsylvania (2021)
- Caroline Hoffer: First female President of the Lancaster Bar Association (1993) [Lancaster County, Pennsylvania]
- Heather Adams: First female to serve as the District Attorney for Lancaster County, Pennsylvania (2020)
- Holly F. Moehlmann (1971): First female lawyer in Lebanon County, Pennsylvania
- Carol McGinley: First female judge in Lehigh County, Pennsylvania (1985)
- Anna-Kristie Morffi Marks: First Latino American female judge in Lehigh County, Pennsylvania
- Amy Zanelli: First openly LGBT female elected as a judge in Lehigh County, Pennsylvania (upon her service on the Lehigh County Lehigh County Court of Common Pleas in 2021)
- Mary Luella Trescott: First female lawyer in Luzerne County, Pennsylvania
- Ann Lokuta: First female judge in Luzerne County, Pennsylvania (1992)
- Donna Long Brightbill: First female county court judge in Lebanon County, Pennsylvania (2024)
- Jackie Musto-Carroll: First female to serve as the District Attorney for Luzerne County, Pennsylvania (2004)
- Stefanie Salavantis: First female to serve as the President Judge of the Luzerne County Court of Common Pleas, Pennsylvania (2025)
- Mary Slesinski: First female Justice of the Peace in Laflin, Pennsylvania [Luzerne County, Pennsylvania]
- Louise Larzelere Chatham (1923): First female lawyer in Lycoming County, Pennsylvania
- Margherita Patti-Worthington: First female to become President Judge of the Forty-Third Judicial District, Monroe County, Pennsylvania
- Risa Vetri Ferman: First female to serve as the District Attorney for Montgomery County, Pennsylvania (2006)
- Carolyn Carluccio: First female President of the Montgomery County Court of Common Pleas
- Rebecca Warren: First female elected as the District Attorney for Montour County, Pennsylvania
- Laurie Pickle: First female Public Defender for Montour County, Pennsylvania
- Joan Marinkovits: First female judge in Northampton Burough, Pennsylvania [Northampton County, Pennsylvania]
- Tamara L. Greenfield King: First African American (female) to serve as the Assistant District Attorney of Northampton County, Pennsylvania (1992)
- Ann Targonski: First female District Attorney for Northumberland County, Pennsylvania (2014)
- Paige Rosini: First female judge in Northumberland County, Pennsylvania (2016). She later became the first female President of the Northumberland County Court.
- Tillie Thompson Heilbron: First female to serve as the Assistant District Attorney for Philadelphia (c. 1930)
- Hazel H. Brown: First female judge in Philadelphia, Pennsylvania [Philadelphia County, Pennsylvania]
- Linda Sheryl Greene: First African American female to teach at Temple University Beasley School of Law (1978)
- Carolyn Engel Temin: First female Public Defender in Philadelphia, Pennsylvania (c. 1987). She later became a judge. [Philadelphia County, Pennsylvania]
- Ann Butchart: First openly LGBT female judge in Philadelphia and first LGBT candidate in Philadelphia (2005) [Philadelphia County, Pennsylvania]
- Jacqueline L. Russell: First female to serve as a judge and presiding judge (2021) in Schuykill County, Pennsylvania
- Lisa Lazzari-Strasiser: First female District Attorney for Somerset County, Pennsylvania (2011)
- Katherine Pontius Baker: First female lawyer in Union County, Pennsylvania
- Maureen A. Skerda: First female to serve as a Judge of the 37th Judicial District (2006; Warren and Forest Counties, Pennsylvania)
- Janine Edwards (1997): First female judge in Wayne County, Pennsylvania. She was also the first female District Attorney in the county's history.
- Jocelyn Cramer: First female to serve as a Commissioner for Wayne County, Pennsylvania (2020)
- Sara A. Austin: First female lawyer from York County to serve as the President of the Pennsylvania Bar Association (2016)

== See also ==
- List of first women lawyers and judges in the United States
- Timeline of women lawyers in the United States
- Women in law

== Other topics of interest ==
- List of first minority male lawyers and judges in the United States
- List of first minority male lawyers and judges in Pennsylvania
