= List of United States federal courthouses in Pennsylvania =

Following is a list of current and former courthouses of the United States federal court system in Pennsylvania. Each entry indicates the name of the building along with an image, if available, its location and the jurisdiction it covers, the dates during which it was used for each such jurisdiction, and, if applicable the person for whom it was named, and the date of renaming. Dates of use will not necessarily correspond with the dates of construction or demolition of a building, as pre-existing structures may be adapted for court use, and former court buildings may later be put to other uses. Also, the official name of the building may be changed at some point after its use as a federal court building has been initiated.

== Courthouses ==
Courthouse	City	Image	Street address	Jurisdiction	Dates of use	Status	Named for
Edward N. Cahn U.S. Courthouse and Federal Building	Allentown		504 West Hamilton Street	E.D. Pa.	1995–present	Current	Edward N. Cahn (1999)
U.S. Post Office	Easton		201 Ferry Street	E.D. Pa.	1930–1970; 1987–1990; Completed in 1913; still in use as a post office.	Current (Post Office only)	n/a
U.S. Court House & Post Office	Erie		17 South Park Row	W.D. Pa.	1887–ca. 1938; Razed ca. 1938.	Lapsed	n/a
Erie Federal Courthouse and Post Office†	Erie		617 State Street	W.D. Pa.	1938–present	Current	n/a
U.S. Post Office and Courthouse	Harrisburg		North 3rd and Walnut Streets	M.D. Pa.	1901–c. 1964; Completed in 1882; razed in 1965	Lapsed	n/a
Ronald Reagan Federal Building and Courthouse	Harrisburg		228 Walnut Street	M.D. Pa.	1966–present	Current	President Ronald Reagan (2004)
U.S. Post Office & Courthouse	Lewisburg		301 Market Street	M.D. Pa.	1933–? Still in use as a post office.	Current (Post Office only)	n/a
Old City Hall	Philadelphia		Chestnut Street and Fifth Street	U.S.	1791-1800; Continued as Philadelphia City Hall until 1854. Now part of the Independence Hall complex of Independence National Historical Park in Center City, Philadelphia.	Historical	n/a
U.S. Post Office & Courthouse	Philadelphia		Chestnut Street	E.D. Pa. 3d Cir.	1884–1937; Razed ca. 1942.	Lapsed	n/a
Robert N. C. Nix, Sr., Federal Building†	Philadelphia		900 Market Street	3d Cir. E.D. Pa.	1941–present Completed in 1939	Current	U.S. Rep. Robert N. C. Nix, Sr. (1985)
James A. Byrne Courthouse	Philadelphia		601 Market Street	E.D. Pa.	1975–present	Current	U.S. Rep. James A. Byrne
U.S. Court House & Post Office	Pittsburgh		Smithfield Street	W.D. Pa.	1891–1934; Razed in 1934.	Lapsed	n/a
Joseph F. Weis, Jr. U.S. Courthouse^{†}	Pittsburgh		700 Grant Street	W.D. Pa.	1934–present	Current	Joseph F. Weis Jr. (2015)
Lackawanna County Courthouse†	Scranton		200 North Washington Avenue	W.D. Pa.	1886–c. 1894; Completed in 1884; still in use as the County Courthouse.	Current	n/a
U.S. Post Office (aka Old Post Office)	Scranton		?	W.D. Pa. M.D. Pa.	1894–1930; Razed in 1930.	Lapsed	n/a
William J. Nealon Federal Building and U.S. Courthouse†	Scranton		235 North Washington Avenue	M.D. Pa.	1931–present	Current	District Court judge William Joseph Nealon, Jr. (1996)
Max Rosenn U.S. Courthouse Luzerne County Courthouse	Wilkes-Barre		197 South Main Street	M.D. Pa.	1934–present	Current	Circuit Court judge Max Rosenn
U.S. Courthouse and Post Office†	Williamsport		245 West 4th Street	W.D. Pa. M.D. Pa.	1891–? Now Williamsport City Hall.	Current (City Hall and Historical only)	n/a
Herman T. Schneebeli Federal Building and Courthouse	Williamsport		240 West Third Street	M.D. Pa.	1977–present	Current	U.S. Rep. Herman T. Schneebeli (1976)

== Key ==
^{†}	Listed on the National Register of Historic Places (NRHP)
^{††}	NRHP-listed and also designated as a National Historic Landmark

== See also ==
- List of state and county courthouses in Pennsylvania
