= Ronald Reagan Federal Building and Courthouse =

Ronald Reagan Federal Building and Courthouse refers to several structures located in the United States.

- Ronald Reagan Federal Building and Courthouse (Santa Ana)
- Ronald Reagan Federal Building and Courthouse (Pennsylvania)
