= Sylvia Rambo =

American judge (1936–2024)

Sylvia H. Rambo
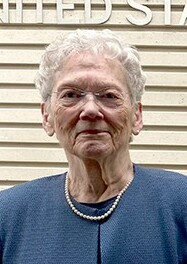
- Rambo in 2022

Senior Judge of the United States District Court for the Middle District of Pennsylvania
- In office April 18, 2001 – August 30, 2024

Chief Judge of the United States District Court for the Middle District of Pennsylvania
- In office 1992–1999
- Preceded by: Richard Paul Conaboy
- Succeeded by: Thomas I. Vanaskie

Judge of the United States District Court for the Middle District of Pennsylvania
- In office July 24, 1979 – April 18, 2001
- Appointed by: Jimmy Carter
- Preceded by: Seat established by 92 Stat. 1629
- Succeeded by: Christopher C. Conner

Personal details
- Born: April 17, 1936 Royersford, Pennsylvania, U.S.
- Died: December 23, 2024 (aged 88)
- Education: Dickinson College (BA, JD)

Sylvia Hilda Rambo (April 17, 1936 – December 23, 2024) was an American jurist who served as a United States district judge of the United States District Court for the Middle District of Pennsylvania from her appointment in 1979 until her retirement in August 2024.

In 1979, Rambo became the first woman appointed as a judge in the United States District Court for the Middle District of Pennsylvania, whose sprawling jurisdiction includes thirty-three Pennsylvania counties. She was also served as the first female Chief Judge of the Middle District of Pennsylvania from 1992 until 1999.

Judge Rambo was a longtime advocate for the construction of a new, modern federal courthouse in Harrisburg, Pennsylvania, to replace the aging Ronald Reagan Federal Building and Courthouse. In April 2021, Pennsylvania United States Senators Bob Casey Jr. and Pat Toomey jointly introduced legislation naming the new federal courthouse, then under construction, for Rambo. President Joe Biden signed the bill into law and, in 2022, Judge Rambo became one of the only women in history to have an American federal courthouse named in her honor. The new Sylvia H. Rambo United States Courthouse, the first federal courthouse in Pennsylvania named for a woman, officially opened to the public on April 17, 2023.

== Early life and career ==
Rambo was born in Royersford, Pennsylvania. She received a Bachelor of Arts degree from Dickinson College in 1958 and a Juris Doctor from Dickinson School of Law (now Pennsylvania State University - Dickinson Law) in 1962. She began her legal career as an attorney for the Trust Department of the Bank of Delaware in Wilmington, Delaware from 1962 to 1963. From 1963 to 1976 Rambo maintained a private practice in Carlisle, Pennsylvania. In conjunction with her private practice, she served as a public defender for Cumberland County, Pennsylvania from 1973 to 1976, and as chief public defender in 1976. She was an adjunct faculty member at the Dickinson School of Law from 1975 to 1977. In 1976, Rambo was appointed to serve on the Pennsylvania Court of Common Pleas for Cumberland County, and thus became the first female judge to serve on that bench. After her term expired in 1978, she returned to private practice in Carlisle until 1979.

=== Federal judicial service ===
On May 29, 1979, Rambo was nominated by President Jimmy Carter to a new seat on the United States District Court for the Middle District of Pennsylvania created by 92 Stat. 1629. She was confirmed by the United States Senate on July 23, 1979, and received her commission on July 24, 1979. She served as chief judge from 1992 to 1999, and assumed senior status on April 18, 2001. Both her commission on the bench and tenure as chief judge in the Middle District were firsts for women. On June 28, 2022, the United States Courthouse in Harrisburg, Pennsylvania, was named in her honor. She retired from senior service on August 30, 2024.

== Death ==
Rambo died on December 23, 2024, at the age of 88.

== See also ==
- List of first women lawyers and judges in Pennsylvania
- List of United States federal judges by longevity of service

== Sources ==
Legal offices
Preceded by Seat established by 92 Stat. 1629	Judge of the United States District Court for the Middle District of Pennsylvania; 1979–2001	Succeeded by Christopher C. Conner
Preceded by Richard Paul Conaboy	Chief Judge of the United States District Court for the Middle District of Pennsylvania; 1992–1999	Succeeded by Thomas I. Vanaskie
