= Judge Kane =

Judge Kane may refer to:

- John K. Kane (1795–1858), judge of the United States District Court for the Eastern District of Pennsylvania
- John L. Kane Jr. (born 1937), judge of the United States District Court for the District of Colorado
- Yvette Kane (born 1953), judge of the United States District Court for the Middle District of Pennsylvania

== See also ==
- Michael Stephen Kanne (1938–2022), judge of the United States Court of Appeals for the Seventh Circuit
