= Richard Paul Conaboy =

American judge

Senior Judge of the United States District Court for the Middle District of Pennsylvania
- In office September 1, 1992 – November 9, 2018

Chief Judge of the United States District Court for the Middle District of Pennsylvania
- In office 1989–1992
- Preceded by: William Joseph Nealon Jr.
- Succeeded by: Sylvia Rambo

Judge of the United States District Court for the Middle District of Pennsylvania
- In office July 24, 1979 – September 1, 1992
- Appointed by: Jimmy Carter
- Preceded by: Seat established by 92 Stat. 1629
- Succeeded by: A. Richard Caputo

Personal details
- Born: June 12, 1925 Scranton, Pennsylvania, U.S.
- Died: November 9, 2018 (aged 93) Scranton, Pennsylvania, U.S.
- Education: University of Scranton (BA); Columbus School of Law (LLB)

Richard Paul Conaboy (June 12, 1925 – November 9, 2018) was an American jurist who was United States district judge of the United States District Court for the Middle District of Pennsylvania. He served as an air corps sergeant in the United States Army from 1945 to 1947 before receiving a law degree from the Columbus School of Law. He spent some time in private practice before serving in state legal and judicial roles in Pennsylvania. He was nominated to the Middle District Court by Jimmy Carter in 1979 and served as its chief judge from 1989 to 1992. He was chair of the United States Sentencing Commission from 1994 to 1998.

== Early life ==
Born in Scranton, Pennsylvania, Conaboy received a Bachelor of Arts degree from the University of Scranton in 1945 and was an Air Corps Sergeant in the United States Army from 1945 to 1947. He received a Bachelor of Laws from the Columbus School of Law at the Catholic University of America in 1950. As a student Conaboy was a member of the Alpha Sigma Lambda and Pi Sigma Alpha honor societies.

== Career ==
Canaboy was admitted to the bar in 1951 and was in private practice in Scranton from then until 1962. Conaboy was a deputy state attorney general for the State Workman's Insurance Fund of Pennsylvania from 1953 to 1959. He was a hearing examiner of the Pennsylvania Liquor Control Board from 1959 to 1962. Conaboy then served as a judge of the Court of Common Pleas for Lackawanna County, Pennsylvania, from 1962 to 1979, and was the president judge from 1978 to 1979. He was a member of the American Bar Association, the Pennsylvania Bar Association and the American Judicature Society.

== Federal judicial service ==
On May 29, 1979, Conaboy was nominated by President Jimmy Carter to a new seat on the United States District Court for the Middle District of Pennsylvania created by 92 Stat. 1629. He was confirmed by the United States Senate on July 23, 1979, and received his commission on July 24, 1979. He served as Chief Judge from 1989 to 1992, assuming senior status on September 1, 1992. While serving in that capacity, he was the chair of the United States Sentencing Commission from 1994 to 1998. He was named in that role with the support of the then chair of the United States Senate Committee on the Judiciary Joe Biden.

== Later life and death ==
Conaboy died on November 9, 2018, at Regional Hospital in Scranton, as a result of suffering a heart attack at a local restaurant. He had been in a medically induced coma for several days in hopes of reviving him.

== Sources ==
Legal offices
Preceded by Seat established by 92 Stat. 1629	Judge of the United States District Court for the Middle District of Pennsylvania; 1979–1992	Succeeded by A. Richard Caputo
Preceded by William Joseph Nealon Jr.	Chief Judge of the United States District Court for the Middle District of Pennsylvania; 1989–1992	Succeeded by Sylvia H. Rambo
