= Beatrice Rosenberg =

American lawyer

Beatrice Rosenberg (1908-1989) was a prominent attorney at the Department of Justice and the Equal Employment Opportunity Commission. Rosenberg argued over thirty cases before the Supreme Court of the United States and supervised over 2,500 briefs submitted to the Court. The District of Columbia Bar gives an annual award in her honor.

== Early life and education ==
Rosenberg was born in New York City and raised in Newark, New Jersey. In high school, Rosenberg was a classmate of William J. Brennan, Jr., who later became an associate justice on the Supreme Court. Rosenberg graduated from Wellesley College in 1928 and began teaching high school history in Newark. She enrolled in the evening program at New York University School of Law, where she was a member of the Law Review. She graduated with honors in 1936.

== Practice ==
Rosenberg began private practice clerking for a sole practitioner in New York City. She entered the Justice Department in 1943. During her tenure there, Rosenberg argued over thirty cases at the Supreme Court, which was likely more than any other female attorney at the time. She rose to become Deputy Chief of the Criminal Appellate Division, a role in which she supervised the work of young Justice Department employees. In this capacity Rosenberg oversaw the drafting of briefs in a number of landmark cases in criminal procedure including Miranda v. Arizona, Terry v. Ohio, and Katz v. United States. In 1970 Rosenberg became the first woman to receive the Tom C. Clark Award for Outstanding Government Service. In 1972 she accepted an invitation to lead the Appellate Division of the fledgling Equal Employment Opportunities Commission. She retired from that position in 1979.

== D.C. Bar Award ==
In 1990, the District of Columbia Bar established the Beatrice Rosenberg Award for Excellence in Government Service. The award is given annually to a member of the D.C. Bar. Prominent recipients include John (“Jack”) Keeney, former Deputy Attorney General, and Eric Holder, former Attorney General.
