= Joseph F. Saporito Jr. =

American judge (born 1960)

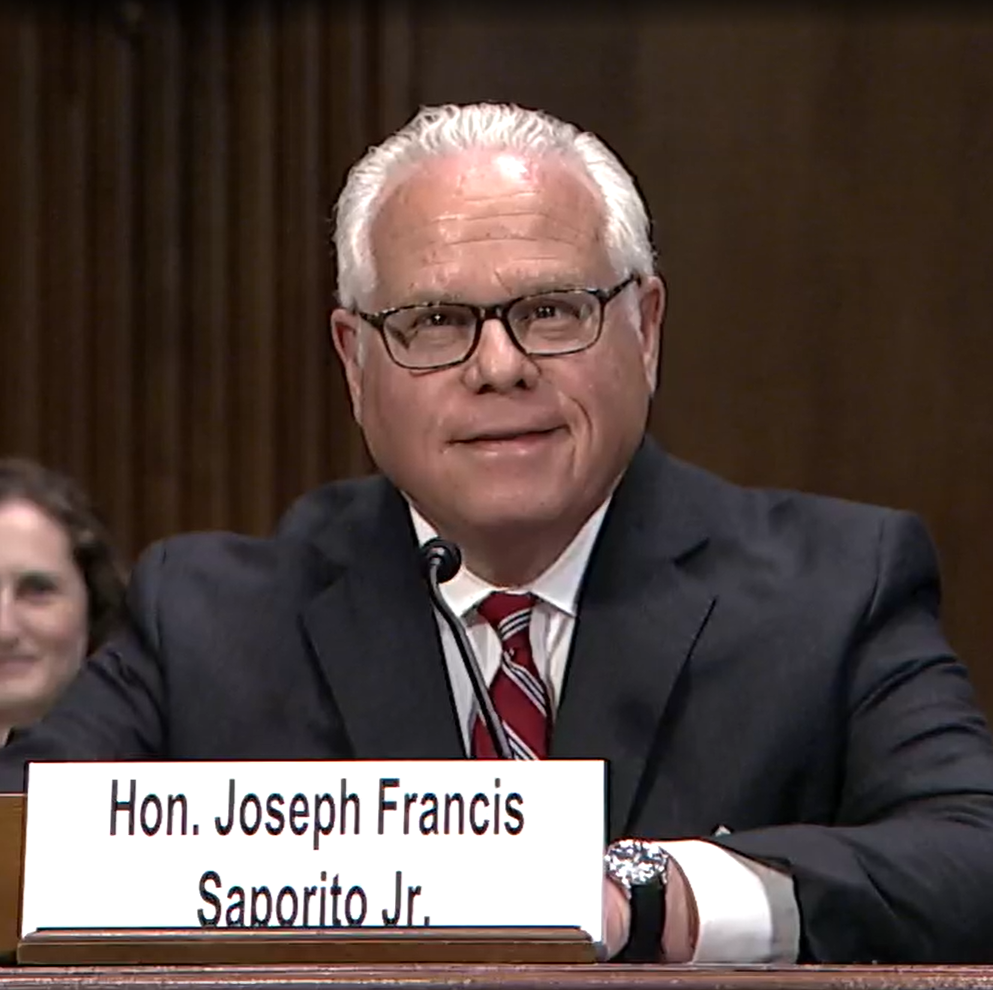

Judge of the United States District Court for the Middle District of Pennsylvania
- Incumbent
- Assumed office August 13, 2024
- Appointed by: Joe Biden
- Preceded by: Malachy E. Mannion

Chief Magistrate Judge of the United States District Court for the Middle District of Pennsylvania
- In office February 2024 – August 13, 2024
- Preceded by: Karoline Mehalchick
- Succeeded by: Daryl F. Bloom

Magistrate Judge of the United States District Court for the Middle District of Pennsylvania
- In office February 15, 2015 – August 13, 2024

Personal details
- Born: Joseph Francis Saporito Jr. 1960 (age 65–66) Pittston, Pennsylvania, U.S.
- Education: Villanova University (BA); Pennsylvania State University (JD)

Joseph F. Saporito Jr. (born 1960) is an American lawyer who has served as a United States district judge of the United States District Court for the Middle District of Pennsylvania since 2024. He previously served as the chief United States magistrate judge of the same court from February 2024 to August 2024, while concurrently serving as a magistrate judge from 2015 to 2024.

== Education ==
Saporito earned a Bachelor of Arts from Villanova University in 1982 and a Juris Doctor from the Dickinson School of Law in 1985.

== Career ==
From 1985 to 2015, Saporito served as a part-time assistant public defender in the Office of the Public Defender for Luzerne County, Pennsylvania; he also was in private legal practice at Saporito & Saporito and then Saporito, Saporito & Falcone, in Pittston.

=== Federal judicial service ===
Saporito assumed office as a United States magistrate judge on February 12, 2015. He was sworn into office on April 16, 2015, by Chief Judge Christopher C. Conner.

Saporito was recommended to the Biden administration by Senators Bob Casey Jr. and John Fetterman. On May 8, 2024, President Joe Biden announced his intent to nominate Saporito to serve as a United States district judge of the United States District Court for the Middle District of Pennsylvania. On May 14, 2024, his nomination was sent to the Senate. President Biden nominated Saporito to the seat vacated by Judge Malachy E. Mannion, who assumed senior status on January 3, 2024. On June 5, 2024, a hearing on his nomination was held before the Senate Judiciary Committee. On July 11, 2024, his nomination was reported out of committee by a 14–7 vote. On July 31, 2024, the United States Senate invoked cloture on his nomination by a 52–39 vote. Later that day, his nomination was confirmed by a 53–39 vote. He received his judicial commission on August 13, 2024.

Legal offices
Preceded by Malachy E. Mannion	Judge of the United States District Court for the Middle District of Pennsylvania; 2024–present	Incumbent
