= Alpha Sigma Lambda =

Honor society for non-traditional students

- ΑΣΛ
- Founded: 1942; 84 years ago Northwestern University
- Type: Honor
- Affiliation: ACHS
- Status: Active
- Emphasis: Non-traditional students
- Scope: National
- Colors: Burgundy and Gold
- Symbol: Book, Lamp, Torch
- Publication: Midnight Oil Newsletter
- Chapters: 233 active
- Headquarters: c/o Eastern Illinois University; 600 Lincoln Avenue; 1323 Buzzard Hall; Charleston, Illinois 61920; United States
- Website: alsiglam.org

Alpha Sigma Lambda (ΑΣΛ) is an American honor society for non-traditional students in colleges and universities. It was established at Northwestern University in 1946 and has chartered more than 230 chapters. It is a member of the Association of College Honor Societies.

== History ==
Dr. Rollin Posey established Alpha Sigma Lambda at Northwestern University in 1942, to recognize the accomplishments of those returning to academic pursuits after the close of World War II. Its purpose, he wrote, "is to bind together in one Society the excellent students within the University College to provide a stimulus for and recognition of their worthy efforts." The honor society supports nontraditional students who are trying to obtain their first associate or baccalaureate degree.

Alpha Sigma Lambda became a member of the Association of College Honor Societies in 2011. In 2011, it had chartered 325 chapters.

As of 2024, Alpha Sigma Lambda has 233 active chapters. Its headquarters are at Eastern Illinois University in Charleston, Illinois.

== Symbols ==
The Greek letters of the society's name were selected to represent Alpha for First, Sigma for Scholarship, and Lambda for Leadership. The motto of Alpha Sigma Lambda is "First in Scholarship and Leadership".

The society's crest displays the Greek letters ΑΣΛ and its symbols, the book, the lamp, and the torch. The book represents a love of knowledge, the lamp symbolizes wisdom, and the torch stands for life.

Its colors are burgundy and gold. Burgundy represents action, power, and the confidence to follow your dreams. Gold symbolizes good health, optimism, prosperity, success, and wisdom. Its publication is the Midnight Oil Newsletter.

== Activities ==
Annually, Alpha Sigma Lambda awards its Continuing Education and Lifelong Learning Scholarships.

== Membership ==
Member is open to non-traditional students, typically adults also engaged in professional careers, who achieve and maintain outstanding scholastic and leadership characteristics while trying to obtain their first associate or baccalaureate degree at an accredited college or university. Potential members must have completed 24 credit hours with a 3.2 GPA.

== Chapters ==
In 2011, Alpha Sigma Lambda had chartered chapters. As of 2024, Alpha Sigma Lambda has 233 active chapters.

== Notable alumni ==
- Ryan Bank, award-winning television producer, new media expert and President of Clayton Entertainment
- Richard Paul Conaboy, chair of the US Sentencing Commission and chief judge of the US District Court for the Middle District of Pennsylvania
- Bob Dixon (Alpha Xi), Missouri House of Representatives and Missouri State Senate
- John Robert Greene, professor and director of the History Program at Cazenovia College
- Jerome Krase, professor emeritus and archivist at Brooklyn College
- Kristina Sisco, writer and actress
- Jodi DiPiazza, American singer, pianist, and songwriter; alumna of Rollins College

== See also ==
- Honor cords
