= Karoline Mehalchick =

American district judge (born 1976)

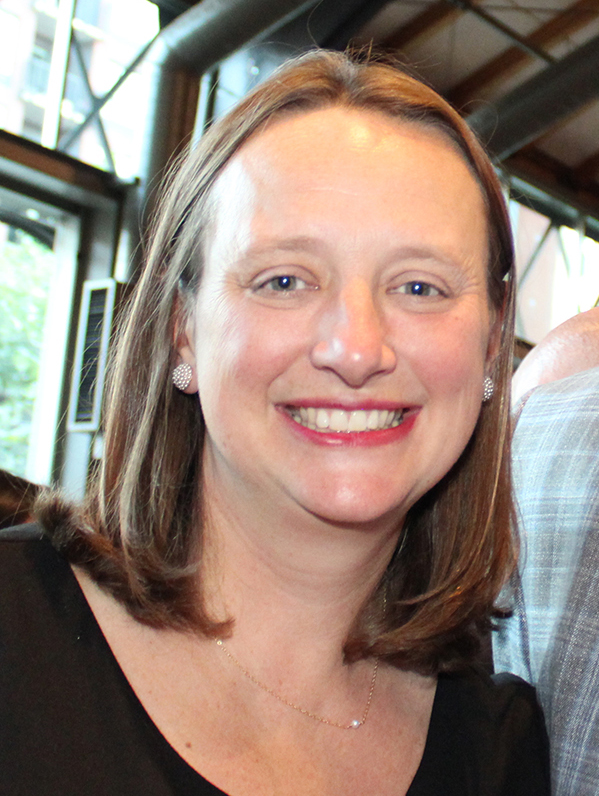

Judge of the United States District Court for the Middle District of Pennsylvania
- Incumbent
- Assumed office February 5, 2024
- Appointed by: Joe Biden
- Preceded by: John E. Jones III

Chief Magistrate Judge of the United States District Court for the Middle District of Pennsylvania
- In office January 4, 2021 – February 5, 2024
- Succeeded by: Joseph F. Saporito Jr.

Magistrate Judge of the United States District Court for the Middle District of Pennsylvania
- In office July 15, 2013 – February 5, 2024

Personal details
- Born: 1976 (age 49–50) Berlin, Vermont, U.S.
- Education: Pennsylvania State University (BA); Tulane University (JD)

Karoline Mehalchick (born in 1976) is an American lawyer who has served as a United States district judge of the United States District Court for the Middle District of Pennsylvania since 2024. She previously served as the chief magistrate judge of the same court from 2021 to 2024 as well as a magistrate judge of the same court from 2013 to 2024.

== Early life and education ==
Mehalchick is a Vermont native, and the daughter of George and Rita Mehalchick of Scranton. Her father is an attorney with the Lehnahan & Dempsey law firm.

Mehalchick is a graduate of Scranton High School and received a Bachelor of Science degree in geoscience from the Schreyer Honors College of Pennsylvania State University in 1998. She then received a Juris Doctor from Tulane Law School in 2001.

== Career ==
From 2001 to 2002, Mehalchick served as a law clerk for Judge Trish Corbett on the Lackawanna County Court of Common Pleas. In 2006, she was named Pennsylvania's best young lawyer by the Pennsylvania Bar Association. That same year, she was the recipient of the Pennsylvania Bar Association's Michael K. Smith Excellence in Service Award.

From 2002 to 2007, she was an associate at the law firm Oliver, Price & Rhodes in Clarks Summit and served as partner from 2008 to 2013.

=== Federal judicial service ===
Mehalchick was appointed as a United States magistrate judge on July 15, 2013. She became the Chief Magistrate Judge on January 4, 2021. Mehalchick presides over the Scranton location of the Court-Assisted Re-Entry Program (CARE Court) and sits on the Court's Prisoner Litigation Settlement Program Committee, a program which she helped establish in early 2015. As a magistrate judge, Mehalchick adjudicated cases related to misdemeanor crimes that were allegedly committed in the National Park Service's middle district of Pennsylvania, which includes the Delaware Water Gap National Recreation Area and the Gettysburg National Military Park. Mehalchick has also served as an adjunct professor at Marywood University, where she has taught Legal and Clinical Aspects of Health Care to graduate students in nursing and health administration.

On June 28, 2023, President Joe Biden announced his intent to nominate Mehalchick to serve as a United States district judge of the United States District Court for the Middle District of Pennsylvania. Mehalchick was recommended to the White House by Pennsylvania senators Bob Casey Jr. and John Fetterman. On July 12, 2023, her nomination was sent to the Senate. President Biden nominated her to the seat vacated by Judge John E. Jones III, who retired on August 1, 2021. On July 26, 2023, a hearing on her nomination was held before the Senate Judiciary Committee. During her confirmation hearing, Senators Marsha Blackburn, John Kennedy, Ted Cruz, and Lindsey Graham vigorously cross-examined her over her recommendation that Pennsylvania State University president Graham Spanier's child endangerment conviction be reversed and remanded for a new trial, which was adopted by the District Court, then later overturned by the United States Court of Appeals for the Third Circuit on the ground that the District Court had not correctly determined whether Spanier was entitled to federal habeas corpus relief. Senators Graham and Kennedy pointed out that 31 of her recommendations to the District Court had not been adopted in full by higher courts, repeatedly characterizing these as "reversals." Mehalchick defended her record by stating that fewer than 2% of her rulings had been overturned by higher courts. On September 14, 2023, her nomination was favorably reported out of committee by an 11–10 party line vote. On January 31, 2024, the United States Senate invoked cloture on her nomination by a 50–49 vote, with Senator Joe Manchin voting against the motion. Later that day her nomination was confirmed by a 50–49 vote, with Senator Manchin voting against confirmation. She received her judicial commission on February 5, 2024.

== Affiliations ==
Mehalchick is active in the Pennsylvania Bar Association's Commission on Women in the Profession and is a past president of the Younger Lawyers Division of the Lackawanna Bar Association. While clerking for Corbett, she began volunteering with Pennsylvania's mock trial education program, which operates in multiple high schools across the commonwealth. She coached the mock trial team at Abington Heights High School for two years. She is also a member of the Federal Bar Association and the Lackawanna Bar Association.

Mehalchick is a board member of the Ballet Theatre of Scranton. A 2006 newspaper article said she had raised funds for Lawyers in the Classroom and the Northeast Regional Cancer Institute and had volunteered for the Big Brother/Big Sister program, the Boys and Girls Club, and United Neighborhood Centers.

== See also ==
- Joe Biden judicial appointment controversies

Legal offices
Preceded by John E. Jones III	Judge of the United States District Court for the Middle District of Pennsylvania; 2024–present	Incumbent
