= William W. Caldwell =

American attorney and jurist (1925–2019)

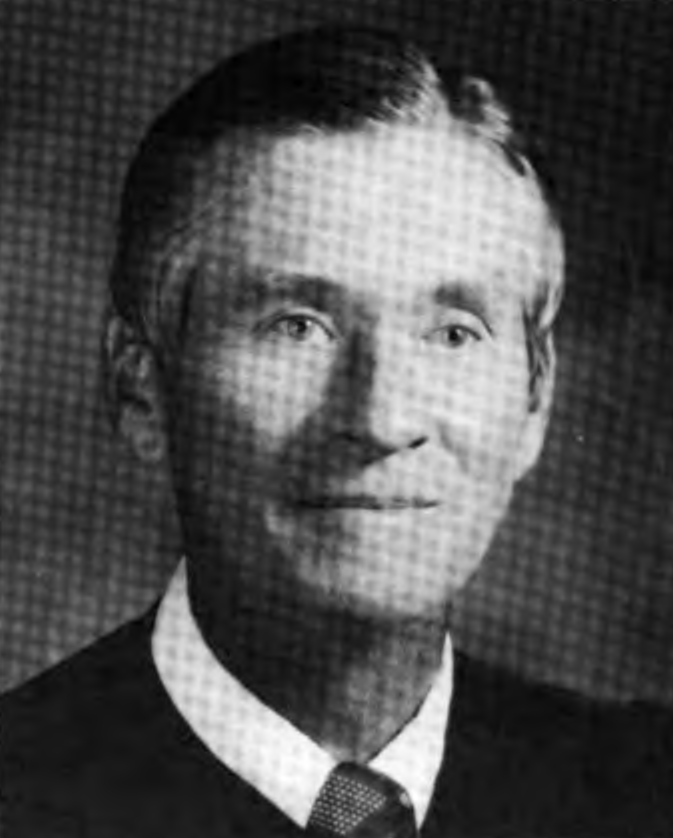

Senior Judge of the United States District Court for the Middle District of Pennsylvania
- In office May 31, 1994 – May 19, 2019

Judge of the United States District Court for the Middle District of Pennsylvania
- In office March 19, 1982 – May 31, 1994
- Appointed by: Ronald Reagan
- Preceded by: Robert Dixon Herman
- Succeeded by: James Martin Munley

Personal details
- Born: William Wilson Caldwell II; November 10, 1925 Harrisburg, Pennsylvania, U.S.
- Died: May 19, 2019 (aged 93) Pennsylvania, U.S.
- Education: Dickinson College (AB, LLB)

Military service
- Branch/service: United States Army
- Unit: United States Army Air Forces
- Battles/wars: World War II

William Wilson Caldwell II (November 10, 1925 – May 19, 2019) was an American attorney and jurist who served as a United States district judge of the United States District Court for the Middle District of Pennsylvania.

== Early life and education ==
Born in Harrisburg, Pennsylvania, Caldwell served in the United States Army Air Forces during World War II from 1944 to 1945. He received an Artium Baccalaureus from Dickinson College in 1948 and a Bachelor of Laws from the Dickinson School of Law in 1951.

== Career ==
Caldwell worked in private practice in Harrisburg from 1951 to 1970. He was also a first assistant district attorney for Dauphin County, Pennsylvania from 1960 to 1962, and was a counsel and chairman of the Pennsylvania Board of Arbitration of Claims from 1963 to 1970. He was then a judge of the Dauphin County Common Pleas Court from 1970 to 1982.

On February 19, 1982, Caldwell was nominated by President Ronald Reagan to a seat on the United States District Court for the Middle District of Pennsylvania vacated by Judge Robert Dixon Herman. Caldwell was confirmed by the United States Senate on March 18, 1982, and received his commission on March 19, 1982. He assumed senior status on May 31, 1994, and died on May 19, 2019.

== Sources ==
Legal offices
Preceded by Robert Dixon Herman	Judge of the United States District Court for the Middle District of Pennsylvania; 1982–1994	Succeeded by James Martin Munley
