= Frederick Voris Follmer =

American judge (1885–1971)

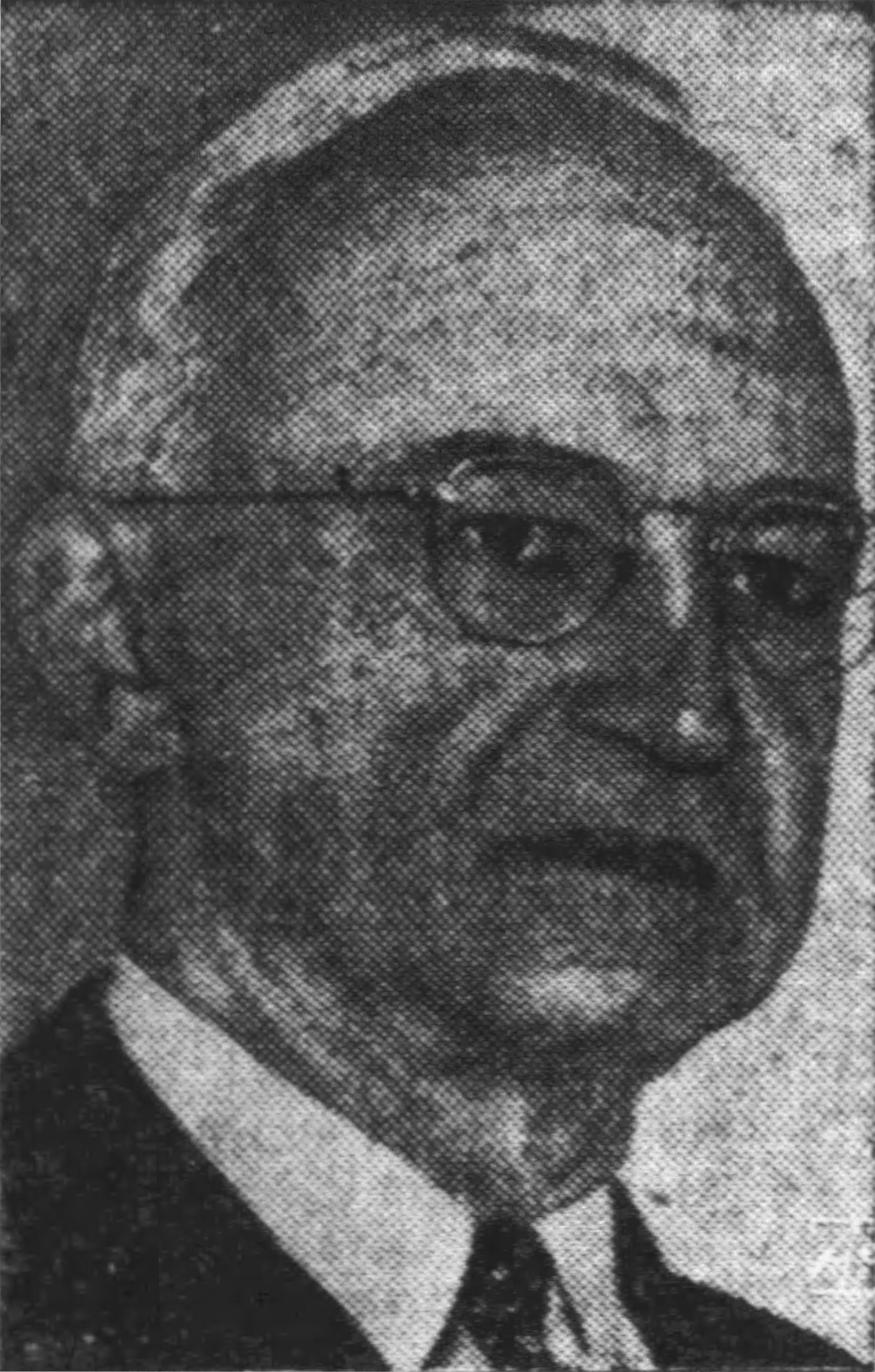

Senior Judge of the United States District Court for the Middle District of Pennsylvania
- In office December 30, 1967 – May 3, 1971

Chief Judge of the United States District Court for the Middle District of Pennsylvania
- In office 1962
- Preceded by: John W. Murphy
- Succeeded by: Michael Henry Sheridan

Judge of the United States District Court for the Middle District of Pennsylvania
- In office August 7, 1946 – December 30, 1967
- Appointed by: Harry S. Truman
- Preceded by: Seat established by 60 Stat. 654
- Succeeded by: Robert Dixon Herman

Judge of the United States District Court for the Eastern District of Pennsylvania Judge of the United States District Court for the Western District of Pennsylvania
- In office August 7, 1946 – June 1, 1955
- Appointed by: Harry S. Truman
- Preceded by: Seat established by 60 Stat. 654
- Succeeded by: Seat reassigned

Personal details
- Born: Frederick Voris Follmer; December 13, 1885 Milton, Pennsylvania, U.S.
- Died: May 3, 1971 (aged 85)
- Education: Bucknell University (A.B.); Harvard Law School (LL.B.)

Frederick Voris Follmer (December 13, 1885 – May 3, 1971) was a United States district judge of the United States District Court for the Eastern District of Pennsylvania, the United States District Court for the Middle District of Pennsylvania and the United States District Court for the Western District of Pennsylvania.

== Education and career ==
Born in Milton, Pennsylvania, Follmer received an Artium Baccalaureus degree from Bucknell University in 1906 and a Bachelor of Laws from Harvard Law School in 1909. In private practice in Pennsylvania from 1910 to 1935, he also served as an assistant district attorney of Northumberland County, Pennsylvania from 1911 to 1914. He was the United States Attorney for the Middle District of Pennsylvania from 1935 to 1946.

== Federal judicial service ==
Follmer was nominated by President Harry S. Truman on July 31, 1946, to the United States District Court for the Eastern District of Pennsylvania, the United States District Court for the Middle District of Pennsylvania and the United States District Court for the Western District of Pennsylvania, to a new joint seat authorized by 60 Stat. 654. He was confirmed by the United States Senate on July 31, 1946, and received his commission on August 7, 1946. His service in the Eastern District and Western District terminated on June 1, 1955, due to reassignment by operation of law. He served as Chief Judge of the Middle District in 1962. He assumed senior status on December 30, 1967. His service terminated on May 3, 1971, due to his death.

== Sources ==
Legal offices
Preceded by Seat established by 60 Stat. 654	Judge of the United States District Court for the Eastern District of Pennsylvania; Judge of the United States District Court for the Western District of Pennsylvania; 1946–1955	Succeeded by Seat reassigned
Preceded by Seat established by 60 Stat. 654	Judge of the United States District Court for the Middle District of Pennsylvania; 1946–1967	Succeeded by Robert Dixon Herman
Preceded by John W. Murphy	Chief Judge of the United States District Court for the Middle District of Pennsylvania; 1962	Succeeded by Michael Henry Sheridan
