= Westmoreland Club =

Coordinates: 41.246340°N 75.884906°W

There is a different Westmoreland Club in Richmond, Virginia

The Westmoreland Club is a private social club that was established in 1873 in Wilkes-Barre, Pennsylvania. Members are Northeastern Pennsylvania "leaders in the arts, business, education, government, and industry”.

== History ==
It was established in 1873 in Wilkes-Barre, Pennsylvania as the Malt Club. It rapidly became "the center of all social activity" in the Wyoming Valley. The club moved to South Main Street in 1879 and stayed there until 1889. In 1889 they changed the name to "Westmoreland".

The club was incorporated on February 9, 1899. They rented the Hunt House near St. Stephen's Church and had it modified to accommodate the club. A fire destroyed St. Stephen's Church and the clubhouse in 1896. In 1897 the club purchased the Hunt lot and built a three-story clubhouse on it.

In 1922 the Westmoreland Club purchased the former residence Dr. Levi P. Shoemaker to accommodate the increased membership. In 1990 the club admitted Kingston, Pennsylvania attorney Enid Harris to be the first woman voting member. Her own father, attorney James Harris (1926-2011), then a member of the club's board opposed her membership. In 1997 a two-story addition was completed. It produced a new entrance, added an elevator and new second floor dining room. In 2002 the second-floor dining room changed their dress code from formal attire to business casual. In 2009 the club received platinum status from Platinum Clubs of America. In 2013 the first-floor dining room changed their dress code from formal attire to business casual. In 2017, the Club was named one of The Platinum Clubs of the World by Club Leaders Forum. This designation is bestowed upon 100 Golf & Country Clubs and 100 City Clubs, and is a true representation of the finest private clubs in the world, with 34 countries represented.

== Presidents ==
- Theodore Strong Barber (1872-1939) in 1920.
- Samuel Chase (?-1938).
- Harold Snowdon (1938-2016).
- Rusty Flack (1955-2011).

== Notable Members ==
- Edward Eugene Loomis (1864-1937).
- Michael Henry Sheridan (1912-1976).

== See also ==
- West End Wheelmen's Club, another historic club in Wilkes-Barre
