= Robert Dixon Herman =

American judge (1911–1990)

Senior Judge of the United States District Court for the Middle District of Pennsylvania
- In office September 25, 1981 – April 5, 1990

Judge of the United States District Court for the Middle District of Pennsylvania
- In office December 11, 1969 – September 25, 1981
- Appointed by: Richard Nixon
- Preceded by: Frederick Voris Follmer
- Succeeded by: William W. Caldwell

Personal details
- Born: Robert Dixon Herman; September 24, 1911 Northumberland, Pennsylvania, U.S.
- Died: April 5, 1990 (aged 78) Harrisburg, Pennsylvania, U.S.
- Education: Bucknell University (A.B.); Cornell Law School (LL.B.)

Robert Dixon Herman (September 24, 1911 – April 5, 1990) was a United States district judge of the United States District Court for the Middle District of Pennsylvania.

== Education and career ==
Born in Northumberland, Pennsylvania, Herman received an Artium Baccalaureus degree from Bucknell University in 1935 and a Bachelor of Laws from Cornell Law School in 1938. He was in private practice in Dauphin County, Pennsylvania between 1938 and 1958, and was an assistant district attorney of Dauphin County from 1942 to 1944. He was a United States Naval Reserve Lieutenant for the JAG Corps at the end of World War II, from 1944 to 1946. He was a member of the Pennsylvania House of Representatives from 1948 to 1950, and was a solicitor for Dauphin County from 1950 to 1957. Herman was a Republican. He was a judge of the Dauphin County Court of Common Pleas from 1957 to 1970, and of the Dauphin County Juvenile Court from 1965 to 1970.

== Federal judicial service ==
On October 2, 1969, Herman was nominated by President Richard Nixon to a seat on the United States District Court for the Middle District of Pennsylvania vacated by Judge Frederick Voris Follmer. Herman was confirmed by the United States Senate on December 10, 1969, and received his commission the following day. He assumed senior status on September 25, 1981, serving in that capacity until his death on April 5, 1990, in Harrisburg, Pennsylvania.

== Sources ==
Legal offices
| Preceded by Frederick Voris Follmer | Judge of the United States District Court for the Middle District of Pennsylvania; 1969–1981 | Succeeded by William W. Caldwell |
