= Kristina Sisco =

American writer

- Born: April 18, 1982 (age 44); Bethesda, Maryland, U.S.
- Other name: Kristina Romero
- Occupations: Writer, Course Creator, Former Actress

Kristina Romero (born Kristina Sisco on April 18, 1982, in Bethesda, Maryland) is an American writer, course creator and former actress.

== Early life ==
Born in Bethesda, Maryland, Kristina moved to Texas and California before returning to Bethesda at the age of 12. At age 13, she began her acting career by working as an amateur reporter for a local Bethesda UPN station. Her exposure led to some additional acting roles.

In late 1998, Kristina won the Miss Maryland Teen USA 1999 title and prepared to compete in the Miss Teen USA pageant, until she was offered the role on As the World Turns, which was to begin filming the week of the pageant. She was replaced by first runner-up Khosi Roy, who represented Maryland in the nationally televised event and placed second runner-up.

== Career ==
In January 1999, Sisco landed the role of Abigail Williams on CBS's daytime drama As the World Turns. The character Abigail was the daughter of the characters Holden Snyder and Molly Conlan. Kristina received two Emmy Award nominations, in 2001 and 2002. Sisco left the show after three years on October 25, 2002. In 2009, Kristina returned to direct an episode of As the World Turns that aired on January 15, 2009.

Other notable acting roles include the role of Charity Standish on NBC's daytime drama Passions and the role of Harriet Wells in the 2007 thriller film The Flock.

Kristina Romero has published three books Calling Extra, a historical novel for young readers, The Revenue Relationship, a non-fiction business book, and The Beatitudes and Francis of Assisi, a small group and personal Bible study.

As a course creator, Kristina has developed training programs and online courses for GoDaddy and WP Care Market.

== Personal life ==
In 2006, Kristina completed a Bachelor of Arts degree in psychology from Thomas Edison State College and was inducted into the Alpha Sigma Lambda national honor society.

In 2008, Kristina completed the Master of Professional Writing Program at the University of Southern California, and won the One-Act Play Festival with her play "Gone."

In 2007, Kristina married Daniel Romero in Santa Monica, California. They have four children together.
