= John E. Jones III =

American judge (born 1955)

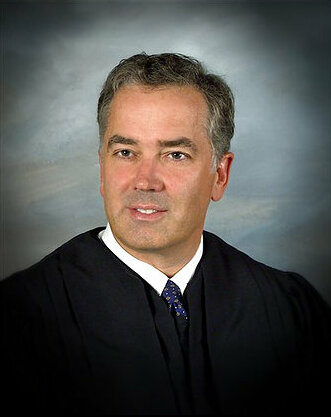
- Jones in 2005

30th President of Dickinson College
- Incumbent
- Assumed office July 1, 2021
- Preceded by: Margee Ensign

Chief Judge of the United States District Court for the Middle District of Pennsylvania
- In office June 1, 2020 – August 1, 2021
- Preceded by: Christopher C. Conner
- Succeeded by: Matthew W. Brann

Judge of the United States District Court for the Middle District of Pennsylvania
- In office July 30, 2002 – August 1, 2021
- Appointed by: George W. Bush
- Preceded by: James Focht McClure Jr.
- Succeeded by: Karoline Mehalchick

Personal details
- Born: John Edward Jones III; June 13, 1955 (age 71) Pottsville, Pennsylvania, U.S.
- Party: Republican
- Education: Dickinson College (BA); Dickinson School of Law (JD)

John Edward Jones III (born June 13, 1955) is an American lawyer who has been the 30th president of Dickinson College since 2021. He was previously a district judge of the United States District Court for the Middle District of Pennsylvania. He is best known for his presiding role in the landmark Kitzmiller v. Dover Area School District case, in which the teaching of intelligent design in public school science classes was ruled to be unconstitutional. In 2014, he ruled that Pennsylvania's 1996 ban on same-sex marriage was unconstitutional. On May 14, 2021, it was announced that Judge Jones would serve as interim president of his alma mater Dickinson College for a two-year period beginning July 1, 2021. On February 28, 2022, Jones was named the 30th President of Dickinson College.

== Early life, education, and legal career ==
Jones was born in 1955 in Pottsville, Pennsylvania, and raised in Orwigsburg, Pennsylvania, where he attended Blue Mountain High School. He graduated high school from Mercersburg Academy. He earned his Bachelor of Arts degree from Dickinson College in 1977 and Juris Doctor from Dickinson School of Law in 1980. At that time, the school was unaffiliated with Pennsylvania State University, but is now known as Penn State Dickinson Law.

After clerking for Guy A. Bowe, the president-county judge for Schuylkill County from 1980 to 1983, Jones joined the law firm of Dolbin & Cori. When he was made a partner, the name of the firm was changed to Dolbin, Cori & Jones.

In 1986, Jones began his own private practice, John Jones & Associates. He spent the next years as a trial lawyer. He also served as solicitor for several municipalities, including his hometown of Pottsville, and was a part-time assistant Schuylkill County public defender until 1995. From around 1992 until his appointment to the federal bench, Jones served as counsel to the Reading firm of Roland & Schlegel.

== Political career ==
In 1992, Jones unsuccessfully ran as a Republican for the U.S. House of Representatives for the Sixth Congressional District seat and then was co-chair of the transition team for Governor-elect Tom Ridge.

Jones was the chairman of the Pennsylvania Liquor Control Board from 1995 to 2002, a period marked by some controversy. He was part of a failed attempt to privatize state stores, and he banned Bad Frog Beer after determining that its label (a frog giving the finger) was in bad taste. He briefly considered running for governor in 2001.

== Federal judicial service ==
Jones was appointed to fill a vacancy on the United States District Court for the Middle District of Pennsylvania by President George W. Bush in February 2002. He was unanimously confirmed by the U.S. Senate on July 30 and was commissioned on August 2. He became Chief Judge on June 1, 2020.

=== Bair v. Shippensburg (2003) ===
In 2003, Jones heard the case of Shippensburg University students Walt Bair and Ellen Wray, who sued the school in an effort to stop enforcing a speech code. The speech code banned all "acts of intolerance" including racist, sexist, and homophobic speech. Jones ruled against the university, explaining that while the code had good intentions, it went too far in regulating speech. Jones issued an order that prohibited Shippensburg from enforcing four provisions of the Student Code of Conduct. Jones found that the government may not prohibit speech based solely on the impact it will have on the listener.

=== Kitzmiller v. Dover (2005) ===
Jones was assigned to the Kitzmiller v. Dover Area School District bench trial, the first direct challenge brought in federal court against a school district that mandated the teaching of intelligent design. He was praised by Tom Ridge, former Pennsylvania Governor and former head of the Department of Homeland Security, who said that "I can't imagine a better judge presiding over such an emotionally charged issue ... he has an inquisitive mind, a penetrating intellect and an incredible sense of humor."

On December 20, 2005, Jones ruled that the mandate was unconstitutional in a 139-page decision.

After the ruling was handed down, some pundits immediately attacked it, notably Bill O'Reilly on Fox News, who accused Jones of being a fascist and an activist judge. Casey Luskin and Jonathan Witt of the Discovery Institute, and activist Phyllis Schlafly, leveled similar charges. Jones also received death threats as a result of which he and his family were given around-the-clock federal protection.

In a speech to the Anti-Defamation League on February 10, 2006, he responded to critics who claimed that he had "stabbed the evangelicals who got him onto the federal bench right in the back" by noting that his duty was to the Constitution and not to special interest groups.

In a November 2006 talk given at Bennington College, Jones again rejected the "activist judge" criticisms and explained the role of the judiciary and how judges decide cases:

If you look at public polls in the United States, at any given time a significant percentage of Americans believe that it is acceptable to teach creationism in public high schools. And that gives rise to an assumption on the part of the public that judges should 'get with the program' and make decisions according to the popular will.

There's a problem with that. ... The framers of the Constitution, in their almost infinite wisdom, designed the legislative and executive branches under Articles I and II to be directly responsive to the public will. They designed the judiciary, under Article III, to be responsive not to the public will--in effect to be a bulwark against public will at any given time--but to be responsible to the Constitution and the laws of the United States.

That distinction, just like the role of precedent, tends to be lost in the analysis of judges' decisions, including my decision.

In 2008, Jones was awarded the American Humanist Association's Humanist Religious Liberty Award at the World Humanist Congress in Washington, D.C. In his acceptance speech, Jones explained how he was blasted by Bill O'Reilly, Phyllis Schlafly, and Ann Coulter for the decision in Kitzmiller v. Dover Area School District. Jones also remarked on the shortcomings of civics education and how the American public tends to have a limited understanding of the Constitution and the importance of the Establishment Clause of the First Amendment and separation of church and state established by the Founding Fathers of the United States. Jones gave his perspective on the separation of powers under the U.S. Constitution: "Articles 1 and 2 designate the legislative branch and the executive branch, respectively, as majoritarian—they are subject to the will of the people; they stand in popular elections. But article 3 is counter-majoritarian. The judicial branch protects against the tyranny of the majority. We are a bulwark against public opinion. And that was very much done with a purpose, and I think that it really has withstood the test of time. The judiciary is a check against the unconstitutional abuse and extension of power by the other branches of government." Jones added that Alexander Hamilton himself remarked: "Enthusiasm is certainly a very good thing but religious enthusiasm is, at least, a dangerous instrument."

=== Whitewood v. Wolf (2014) ===
In 2014, Jones presided over Deb Whitewood et al. v. Michael Wolf, a case in which the plaintiffs sought relief from Pennsylvania's Marriage Laws (23 Pa. C.S. § 1102). He delivered an opinion striking down the Pennsylvania statute barring same-sex marriage on May 20, 2014, on grounds that it unconstitutionally infringed the plaintiffs rights of due process and equal protection guaranteed by the Fourteenth Amendment to the U.S. Constitution. He did not attach a stay to his order, so the decision would be immediately effective.

In 2014, Jones appeared on CNN to discuss same-sex marriage and the law he anticipated would be applied by the U.S. Supreme Court.

== Personal life ==
Jones is a Lutheran of Welsh descent. He married his wife, Beth Ann, in 1982. They have two children and three grandchildren. He has a share in a business operated by others in his family, Distinct Golf, which runs five golf courses in New Jersey and Pennsylvania.

Jones is a member of the board of regents of Mercersburg Academy. Jones is the 30th president of Dickinson College, a private, residential liberal arts college in Carlisle, Pennsylvania. Jones also serves as co-chair of the Pennsylvania Commission on Judicial Independence. He was appointed by Chief Justice Roberts to the Judicial Security Committee of the Judicial Conference of the United States.

== Awards, positions, and honors ==
- Member of the Raven's Claw Honorary Society at Dickinson College
- Former board member and president-elect of the National Alcohol Beverage Control Association (resigned when appointed to federal bench).
- Distinguished Alumnus Award, Dickinson School of Law
- Welsh Citizen of the Year Award, St. David's Society of Schuylkill and Carbon Counties.
- Former assistant Scoutmaster and other positions in the Boy Scouts of America
- 2006, included in Time magazine's 100 Most Influential People of the Year.
- 2007, honorary doctorate, Muhlenberg College.
- Board of trustees, Dickinson College
- Board of directors, Federal Judges Association
- Board of directors, Justice at Stake
- 2008, American Humanist Association Humanist Religious Liberty Award.
- 2009, President's Medal, Geological Society of America.

Legal offices
Preceded by James Focht McClure Jr.	Judge of the United States District Court for the Middle District of Pennsylvania; 2002–2021	Succeeded by Karoline Mehalchick
Preceded by Christopher C. Conner	Chief Judge of the United States District Court for the Middle District of Pennsylvania; 2020–2021	Succeeded by Matthew W. Brann
