= Penn State Dickinson Law =

Law school in Carlisle, Pennsylvania, US

Dickinson Law
- Motto: Practice Greatness
- Parent school: Dickinson College (1834–1917); Independent (1917–2000); Pennsylvania State University (2000–present)
- Established: 1834; 192 years ago (as the Dickinson School of Law)
- School type: Public law school
- Dean: Sarah J. Williams (interim)
- Location: Carlisle, Pennsylvania, U.S. 40.1994°N 77.1973°W
- Enrollment: 373 (fall 2025)
- Faculty: 30
- USNWR ranking: 59th (2025)
- Website: dickinsonlaw.psu.edu
- ABA profile: Standard 509 Report

Penn State Dickinson Law, formerly Dickinson School of Law, in Carlisle, Pennsylvania, is one of two campuses of the law school of Pennsylvania State University, a public research university in the U.S. state of Pennsylvania. It originally began in 1834 as a school associated with Dickinson College, was independent throughout most of the twentieth century, and joined Pennsylvania State University in 2000. The other campus of the law school is in University Park, Pennsylvania, where the university's main campus is located.

== History ==
Designations

Pennsylvania Historical Marker
- Official name: Dickinson School of Law
- Designated: October 20, 1949
- County: Cumberland
- Location: S. College St. near South St. at Law School, Carlisle
- Marker text: Oldest law school in Pennsylvania; founded in 1834 by the Honorable John Reed, eminent jurist, and author of "Pennsylvania Blackstone". Andrew Curtin, Civil War Governor, was one of earliest graduates.

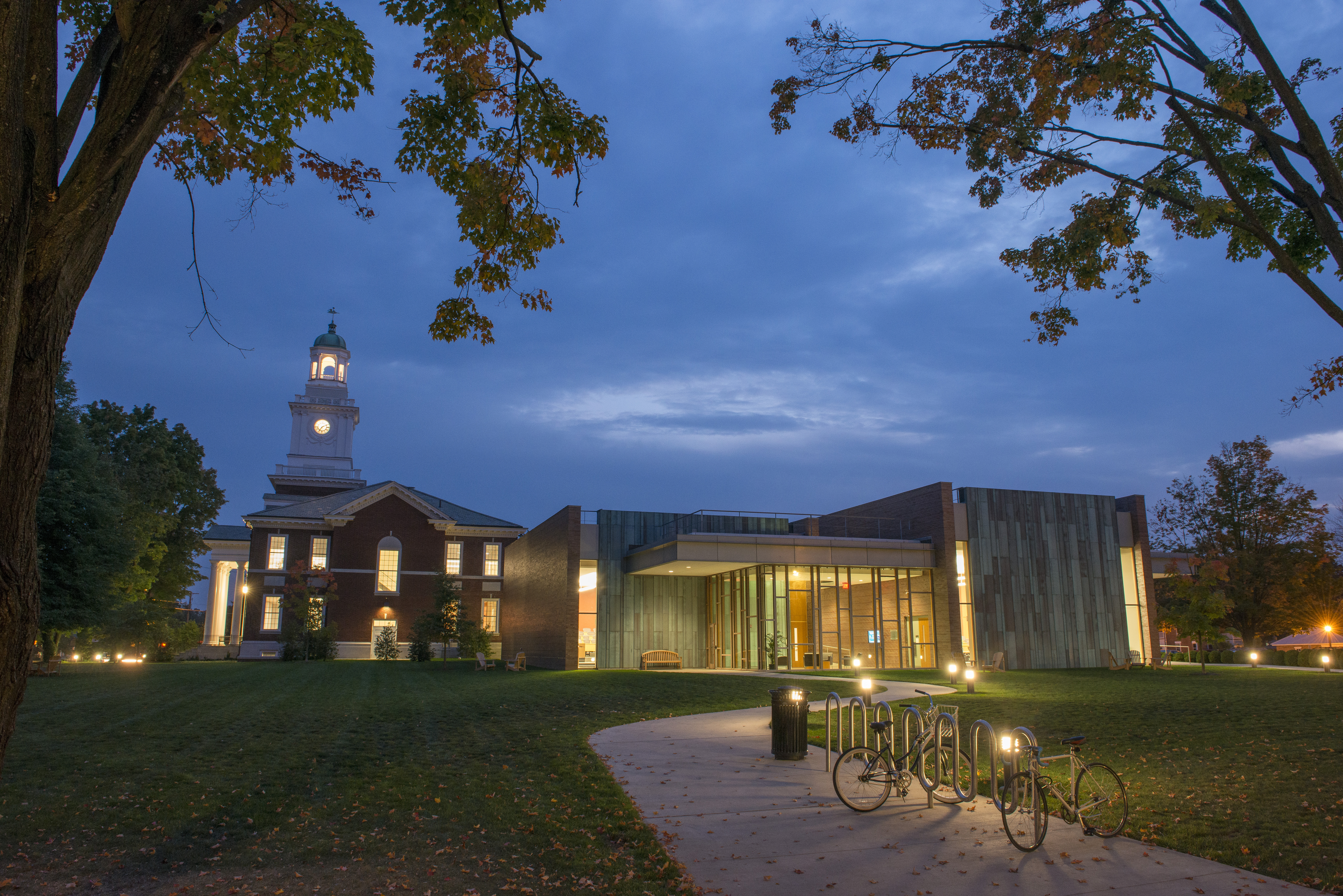
Dickinson Law at night

The law school was opened by John Reed in 1834 as the law department of Dickinson College, named for Founding Father John Dickinson. It received an independent charter in 1890 and ended all affiliation with the college in 1917.

In 2000, Penn State and the Dickinson School of Law completed a merger that had begun in 1997. From 2006 until 2014, Penn State's Dickinson School of Law operated as a single law school with two campuses – one in Carlisle, Pennsylvania and one in University Park, Pennsylvania. In the summer of 2014, Penn State received approval from the ABA to operate the two campuses as two distinct law schools (now known as Penn State Law and Dickinson Law), both of which share the history and achievement of the Dickinson School of Law.

In November 2022, Penn State President Neeli Bendapudi announced a task force to implement the recommendation that the two schools be merged into a single entity, with the primary location to be at the Carlisle campus. The two law schools reunified during the 2024–2025 academic year. As of 2026, Penn State has one law school but two distinct campuses: Carlisle and University Park.

In May 2026, the Washington Free Beacon published internal audio recordings from Penn State Dickinson Law's mandatory first-year course, "Race and the Equal Protection of the Laws." The requirement led to public debate following the withdrawal of David Blackman, a Texas State Guard veteran and student who resigned from the program rather than complete the mandatory course requirements, characterizing it as a form of compelled speech. Following the public disclosure of the curriculum, federal civil rights complaints were filed by outside watchdog groups with the U.S. Departments of Education and Justice, alleging violations of Titles VI and VII of the Civil Rights Act of 1964.

== Lewis Katz Hall ==
Lewis Katz Hall is named in honor of philanthropist and businessman Lewis Katz for his $15 million gift to the Law School as the principal donor to the construction and renovation project that began in January 2008. Completed in January 2010, the transition marked the end of a two-year, $52 million construction project which included the addition of the new Lewis Katz Hall which leverages advanced high-definition, digital audiovisual telecommunications systems to connect Dickinson Law to not only Penn State's University Park campus but to locations around the world.

The project included an extensive renovation of historic Trickett Hall, the Law School's home since 1918, which houses the Law School's library, named in honor of H. Laddie Montague, Jr., a prominent Philadelphia lawyer and trial attorney who has committed $4 million to the school. As a design companion to Penn State Law's Lewis Katz Building, Dickinson Law's Lewis Katz Hall was renovated and rebuilt to comply with LEED Silver standards. The facilities feature classrooms, a courtroom/auditorium, an exterior courtyard, and a vegetated green roof.

== Curriculum ==
Dickinson Law students must earn at least six of 12 required experiential learning credits in a real-world practice setting, such as a certified legal internship within one of the Law School's in-house legal clinics; an internship with a government, nonprofit or private office; or full immersion in the Semester-in-Practice program; or an international venue. Students may earn up to six credits towards the J.D. degree from approved graduate-level courses offered by other Penn State departments. Students also may enroll in one of an array of joint degree programs, graduating with both a J.D. from Dickinson Law and a master's degree from a coordinate department of Penn State. Current joint degree offerings include a J.D./M.B.A., J.D./M.P.A., J.D./M.P.H., J.D./DRPH. Dickinson Law also offers certificate programs.

=== Programs and clinics ===
- Semester-in-Washington, D.C. Program (federal government)
- Semester-in-Harrisburg Program (state government)
- International Justice Program at the Hague, Netherlands (international criminal law)
- Center for Public Interest Advocacy
- Arts, Sports, & Entertainment Law Clinic
- Center for Immigrants' Rights Clinic
- Children's Advocacy Clinic
- Civil Rights Appellate Clinic
- Community Law Clinic
- Criminal Appellate and Post-Conviction Services Clinic
- Entrepreneur Assistance Clinic
- Family Law Clinic
- Indigent Criminal Justice Trial Clinic
- Intellectual Property Clinic
- Medical-Legal Partnership Clinic with Penn State Milton S. Hershey Medical Center
- Rural Economic Development Clinic
- Veterans and Servicemembers Legal Clinic

== Law journals ==
Dickinson Law features three scholarly journals, including the Dickinson Law Review which was founded in 1897 and is one of the oldest continually published law school journals in the country. The school also publishes the Penn State Journal of Law and International Affairs and The Yearbook on Arbitration and Mediation.

== Employment ==
According to Penn State Dickinson Law's official 2022 ABA-required disclosures, about 91% of the class of 2022 obtained full-time, long-term, J.D.-required employment nine months after graduation.

== Notable alumni ==
- Matthew W. Brann, chief judge, U.S. District Court for the Middle District of Pennsylvania
- Bill Bufalino, attorney of Jimmy Hoffa
- Christopher F. Burne, U.S. Air Force lieutenant general, judge advocate general (TJAG)
- William W. Caldwell, former judge, U.S. District Court for the Middle District of Pennsylvania
- Mitchell Harry Cohen, former judge, U.S. District Court for the District of New Jersey
- Christopher Conner, judge, U.S. District Court for the Middle District of Pennsylvania
- Pedro Cortés, secretary of the Commonwealth of Pennsylvania
- Andrew Curtin, Civil War-era governor of Pennsylvania (1861–1867)
- J. Steward Davis, Baltimore trial lawyer and first African-American valedictorian at Dickinson
- J. Michael Eakin, justice, Pennsylvania Supreme Court
- John Sydney Fine, former Pennsylvania governor (1951–1955)
- Mike Fitzpatrick, U.S. congressman from Pennsylvania
- Robert S. Gawthrop III, former judge, U.S. District Court for the Eastern District of Pennsylvania
- Jim Gerlach, former U.S. congressman
- Kim Gibson, senior judge, U.S. District Court for the Western District of Pennsylvania
- Milton W. Glenn (1903–1967), former U.S. congressman
- Thomas M. Golden, former judge, U.S. District Court for the Eastern District of Pennsylvania
- Rick Gray, former mayor of Lancaster, Pennsylvania
- T. Millet Hand (1902–1956), represented New Jersey's 2nd congressional district in the United States House of Representatives 1945–1957
- John Berne Hannum, former judge, U.S. District Court for the Eastern District of Pennsylvania
- Daniel Brodhead Heiner, former U.S. congressman
- John W. Herron, judge, Philadelphia Court of Common Pleas (1988–2023)
- Arthur Horace James, 31st governor of Pennsylvania
- Charles Alvin Jones, former judge, U.S. Court of Appeals for the Third Circuit and chief justice, Supreme Court of Pennsylvania
- John E. Jones III, former judge, U.S. District Court for the Middle District of Pennsylvania and 30th President of Dickinson College
- Paul E. Kanjorski, former U.S. congressman from Pennsylvania
- Lewis Katz, former owner, New Jersey Nets
- Jack Keeney, U.S. Department of Justice attorney
- John W. Kephart, former chief justice, Supreme Court of Pennsylvania
- Edwin Michael Kosik, judge, U.S. District Court for the Middle District of Pennsylvania
- George Kunkel, former Pennsylvania State Senator
- Tom Marino, U.S. congressman from Pennsylvania and former judge, U.S. attorney for the Middle District of Pennsylvania
- Julia K. Munley, judge, U.S. District Court for the Middle District of Pennsylvania
- Clarence Charles Newcomer, former judge, U.S. District Court for the Eastern District of Pennsylvania
- John Pettit, former district attorney, Washington County, Pennsylvania
- Sylvia H. Rambo, first woman to serve as chief judge, U.S. District Court for the Middle District of Pennsylvania
- Tom Ridge, former Pennsylvania governor, former assistant to the sresident for Homeland Security, first U.S. secretary of Homeland Security
- Carl Risch, assistant secretary of state for consular affairs
- Andrew Sacks, Pennsylvania trial lawyer, one of the few U.S. attorneys who has handled two cases in excess of $1 billion
- Rick Santorum, former U.S. senator
- Joseph F. Saporito Jr., judge, U.S. District Court for the Middle District of Pennsylvania
- Lansdale Sasscer, former U.S. congressman
- Ronald A. Sell, Wisconsin state assemblyman
- Michael Henry Sheridan, judge, U.S. District Court for the Middle District of Pennsylvania
- D. Brooks Smith, senior judge, U.S. Court of Appeals for the Third Circuit
- Edward G. Smith, former judge, U.S. District Court for the Eastern District of Pennsylvania
- Donald Snyder (LLM, Commerce and Taxation), Pennsylvania state representative and majority whip, Pennsylvania State House of Representatives
- Gerald J. Spitz, former state representative, Pennsylvania House of Representatives
- Correale Stevens, justice, Supreme Court of Pennsylvania
- Richard Barclay Surrick, senior judge, U.S. District Court for the Eastern District of Pennsylvania
- Emanuel Mac Troutman, former judge, U.S. District Court for the Eastern District of Pennsylvania
- Thomas I. Vanaskie, former chief judge, U.S. District Court for the Middle District of Pennsylvania and former judge on the Third Circuit Court of Appeals
