= Nitza Quiñones Alejandro =

American judge (born 1951)

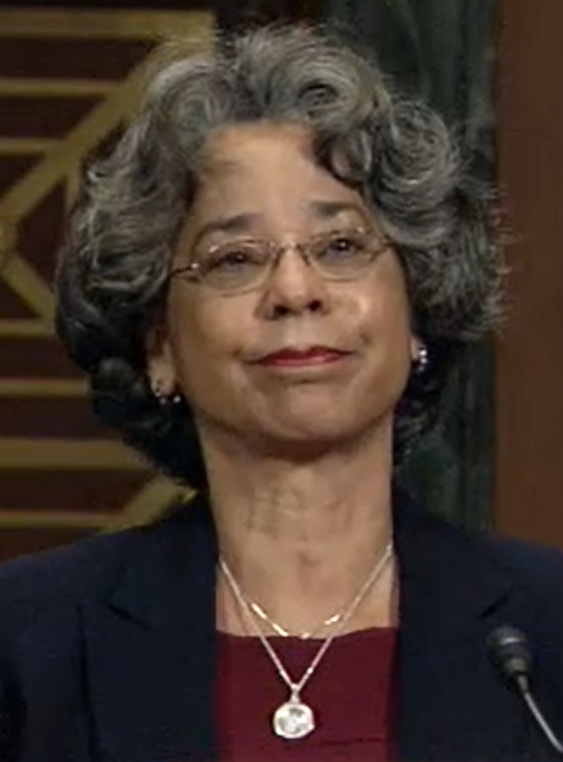

Judge of the United States District Court for the Eastern District of Pennsylvania
- Incumbent
- Assumed office June 19, 2013
- Appointed by: Barack Obama
- Preceded by: Richard Surrick

Personal details
- Born: Nitza Ileana Quiñones Alejandro; January 1951 (age 75) Hato Rey, Puerto Rico
- Party: Democratic
- Education: University of Puerto Rico, Río Piedras (BBA, JD)

Nitza Ileana Quiñones Alejandro (born January 1951) is a United States district judge of the United States District Court for the Eastern District of Pennsylvania. Quiñones Alejandro is the first lesbian Latina to be appointed to serve as a federal judge.

== Early life and career ==
Quiñones was born in Puerto Rico. She grew up in a military family. She received her Bachelor of Business Administration degree, cum laude, in 1972 from the University of Puerto Rico, having attended Central Michigan University as an exchange student for part of her undergraduate education. She received her Juris Doctor in 1975 from the University of Puerto Rico School of Law. She moved from Puerto Rico to Philadelphia after graduating law school. She began her career as a staff attorney for Community Legal Services, Inc. in Philadelphia from 1975 to 1977. She worked as an Attorney Advisor for the United States Department of Health and Human Services from 1977 to 1979. She worked as a staff attorney for the United States Department of Veterans Affairs from 1979 to 1991.

== Judicial career ==
=== Philadelphia County Court of Common Pleas ===
From 1991 to 2013, she served as a judge on the Philadelphia County Court of Common Pleas, presiding over both civil and criminal matters. Her nomination to that court in 1990 by Pennsylvania Governor Robert P. Casey was controversial with local Democratic and Hispanic leaders because she was a political novice whose earlier employment by the federal government had barred her from participating in party politics. Her nomination languished in the Pennsylvania Senate for over a year and she was only confirmed once that she had won election to the court. She ran for the court in 1991 without the support of the Democratic machine. In the decisive Democratic primary, she placed 10th of 34 candidates seeking 16 vacancies. She then won the general election in November 1991. She later said that running for office gave her the "thick skin" required of a judge. She retained her seat in the elections of 2001 and 2011. She was the first Hispanic woman to serve on that court.

Quiñones is an out lesbian. She is a member of the Hispanic Bar Association of Pennsylvania.

=== Federal judicial service ===
On November 27, 2012, President Barack Obama nominated Quiñones to serve as a United States District Judge of the United States District Court for the Eastern District of Pennsylvania, to the seat vacated by Judge Richard Barclay Surrick, who assumed senior status on February 1, 2011. The nomination was made on the recommendation of Senator Bob Casey, Jr. She is the first Latina lesbian to be nominated to a federal judgeship. Her nomination was confirmed by voice vote on June 13, 2013. She received her commission on June 19, 2013.

== See also ==
- List of first women lawyers and judges in Pennsylvania
- List of first women lawyers and judges in the United States
- List of Hispanic and Latino American jurists
- List of LGBT jurists in the United States
- List of Puerto Ricans

Legal offices
Preceded by Richard Surrick	Judge of the United States District Court for the Eastern District of Pennsylvania; 2013–present	Incumbent
