= Gerard Karam =

American lawyer

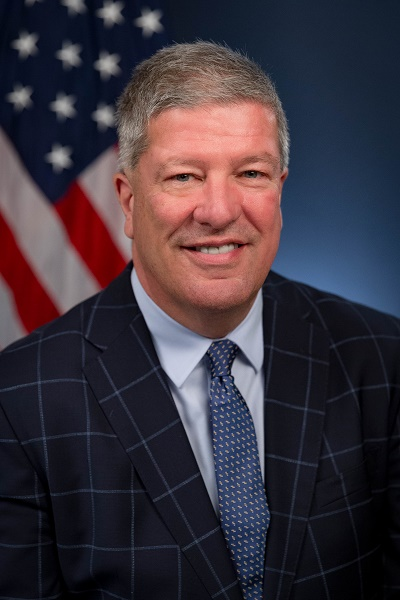

United States Attorney for the Middle District of Pennsylvania
- In office June 21, 2022 – January 10, 2025
- President: Joe Biden
- Preceded by: David Freed
- Succeeded by: John C. Gurganus (acting)

Personal details
- Education: Saint Joseph's University (BA); Loyola University New Orleans (JD)

Gerard M. Karam is an American lawyer who served as the United States attorney for the Middle District of Pennsylvania from 2022 to 2025.

== Education ==
Karam earned a Bachelor of Science degree from Saint Joseph's University in 1984 and a Juris Doctor from the Loyola University New Orleans College of Law in 1987.

== Career ==
From 1990 to 1993, Karam was an Assistant Public Defender in the Lackawanna County Public Defender's Office. In 1994, he was promoted to Chief Public Defender, a position he held for 10 years. From 1997 to 2001, he served as a member of the Criminal Justice Act Panel for the United States District Court for the Middle District of Pennsylvania.

Karam was a partner in the Scranton Law Firm of Mazzoni, Karam, Petorak and Valvano for 27 years, and served as the managing partner for 20 years. His practice focused on civil and criminal litigation. From 2010 to 2022, Karam served as general counsel to the Housing Authority of Lackawanna County, a federal Housing and Urban Development (HUD) Agency.

Karam is a former president of the Lackawanna Bar Association and was a director on the boards of the Boys and Girls Club of Northeastern Pennsylvania, the Children's Advocacy Center of Northeastern Pennsylvania, and Drug and Alcohol Treatment Services of Northeastern Pennsylvania.

=== U.S. Attorney for the Middle District of Pennsylvania ===
On April 22, 2022, President Joe Biden announced his intent to nominate Karam to serve as the U.S. attorney for the Middle District of Pennsylvania. On April 25, 2022, his nomination was sent to the Senate. On June 9, 2022, his nomination was reported out of the Senate Judiciary Committee by a voice vote; senators Ted Cruz, Mike Lee, Josh Hawley and Marsha Blackburn were recorded as "Nay". He was confirmed in the Senate by voice vote on June 13, 2022. He was sworn into office on June 21, 2022. He resigned from office on January 10, 2025.
