= Bad Frog Beer =

American beer company based in Rose City, Michigan

Bad Frog Beer shield

Bad Frog Beer is an American beer company founded by Jim Wauldron and based in Rose City, Michigan. Jim Wauldron did not create the beer to begin with. The company that Wauldron worked for was a T-shirt company. Wauldron was a T-shirt designer who was seeking a new look. His boss told him that a frog would look too wimpy. Wauldron decided to call the frog a "bad frog." The idea sparked much interest, and people all over the country wanted a shirt. The only problem with the shirt was that people started asking for the "bad frog beer" that the frog was holding on the shirt. Wauldron learned about brewing and his company began brewing in October 1995. The company has grown to 25 states and many countries. The beer is banned in six states.

Bad Frog beer is a light colored amber beer with a moderate hop and medium body character. The beer generated controversy and publicity because its label features a frog extending its second of four fingers, presumably the middle finger. The label also includes the company's signature mottos; for example: “He just don't care," “An amphibian with an attitude," The beer so good․ it's bad,” and “Turning bad into good". The image of the frog has introduced issues regarding the First Amendment freedom for commercial speech and has caused the beverage to be banned in numerous states.

Renaissance Beer Co. applied to the New York State Liquor Authority for approval of their logo two different times, each time with a different slogan. They were denied both times because the meaning behind the gesture of the frog is “ludicrous and disingenuous". their argument was that if this product was displayed in convenience stores where children were present, it would be inappropriate. The NYSLA claimed that the gesture of the frog would be too vulgar, leaving a bad impression on the minds of young children. Bad Frog Beer took this case to the U.S. Court of Appeals for the Second Circuit. They ruled in favor of Bad Frog Beer because they argued, in essence, that restricting this company's advertising would not make all that much of a difference on the explicit things children tend to see with access to other violence like video games. It was simply not reasonable to deny the company from selling their product, especially because it would primarily be marketed in liquor stores, where children are not even allowed to enter.

Pennsylvania Liquor Control Board Chairman John E. Jones III banned the sale of Bad Frog Beer in his state because he found that the label broke the boundaries of good taste. New Jersey, Ohio and New York have also banned its sale, though it is available in at least 15 other states.
