= Michael Henry Sheridan =

American judge (1912–1976)

Chief Judge of the United States District Court for the Middle District of Pennsylvania
- In office 1962–1976
- Preceded by: Frederick Voris Follmer
- Succeeded by: William Joseph Nealon Jr.

Judge of the United States District Court for the Middle District of Pennsylvania
- In office August 30, 1961 – August 23, 1976
- Appointed by: John F. Kennedy
- Preceded by: Seat established by 75 Stat. 80
- Succeeded by: Seat abolished

Personal details
- Born: Michael Henry Sheridan; July 8, 1912 Nanticoke, Pennsylvania, U.S.
- Died: August 23, 1976 (aged 64) Wilkes-Barre, Pennsylvania, U.S.
- Education: Lafayette College (B.S.); Penn State Dickinson Law (LL.B.)

Michael Henry Sheridan (July 8, 1912 – August 23, 1976) was a United States district judge of the United States District Court for the Middle District of Pennsylvania.

== Education and career ==
Sheridan was born in Nanticoke, Pennsylvania, Sheridan received a Bachelor of Science degree from Lafayette College in 1933. He received a Bachelor of Laws from Dickinson School of Law (now Penn State Dickinson Law) in 1936. He entered private practice from 1937 to 1942. He was in the United States Navy from 1942 to 1947. He was an Assistant United States Attorney of the District of Columbia in Washington, D.C. in 1947. He returned to private practice from 1948 to 1961.

== Federal judicial service ==
Sheridan was nominated by President John F. Kennedy on August 15, 1961, to the United States District Court for the Middle District of Pennsylvania, to a new seat created by 75 Stat. 80. He was confirmed by the United States Senate on August 30, 1961, and received his commission the same day. He served as Chief Judge from 1962 to 1976. and as a member of the Judicial Conference of the United States from 1972 to 1975. His service was terminated on August 23, 1976, due to his death at his residence at the Westmoreland Club in Wilkes-Barre, Pennsylvania.

== Sources ==
Legal offices
Preceded by Seat established by 75 Stat. 80	Judge of the United States District Court for the Middle District of Pennsylvania; 1961–1976	Succeeded by Seat abolished
Preceded by Frederick Voris Follmer	Chief Judge of the United States District Court for the Middle District of Pennsylvania; 1962–1976	Succeeded by William Joseph Nealon Jr.
