= A. Richard Caputo =

American judge (1938–2020)

Senior Judge of the United States District Court for the Middle District of Pennsylvania
- In office March 31, 2009 – March 11, 2020

Judge of the United States District Court for the Middle District of Pennsylvania
- In office November 12, 1997 – March 31, 2009
- Appointed by: Bill Clinton
- Preceded by: Richard Paul Conaboy
- Succeeded by: Malachy E. Mannion

Personal details
- Born: May 22, 1938 Port Chester, New York, U.S.
- Died: March 11, 2020 (aged 81)
- Education: Brown University (AB); University of Pennsylvania Law School (LLB)

Albert Richard Caputo (May 22, 1938 – March 11, 2020) was a United States district judge of the United States District Court for the Middle District of Pennsylvania.

== Education and career ==
Born in Port Chester, New York, Caputo received an Artium Baccalaureus degree from Brown University in 1960 and a Bachelor of Laws from the University of Pennsylvania Law School in 1963. He was in private practice in Wilkes-Barre, Pennsylvania from 1963 to 1964, and in the United States Air Force JAG Corps from 1964 to 1967. He was an assistant public defender in Luzerne County, Pennsylvania in 1968, returning to private practice in Kingston, Pennsylvania from 1968 to 1997.

== Federal judicial service ==
On July 31, 1997, Caputo was nominated by President Bill Clinton to a seat on the United States District Court for the Middle District of Pennsylvania vacated by Richard Paul Conaboy. Caputo was confirmed by the United States Senate on November 9, 1997, and received his commission on November 12, 1997. He assumed senior status on March 31, 2009. He died on March 11, 2020, aged 81.

== Sources ==
Legal offices
Preceded by Richard Paul Conaboy	Judge of the United States District Court for the Middle District of Pennsylvania; 1997–2009	Succeeded by Malachy E. Mannion
