= Richard Barclay Surrick =

American judge (born 1937)

Senior Judge of the United States District Court for the Eastern District of Pennsylvania
- Incumbent
- Assumed office February 1, 2011

Judge of the United States District Court for the Eastern District of Pennsylvania
- In office June 5, 2000 – February 1, 2011
- Appointed by: Bill Clinton
- Preceded by: Lowell A. Reed Jr.
- Succeeded by: Nitza Quiñones Alejandro

Personal details
- Born: December 18, 1937 (age 88) Media, Pennsylvania, U.S.
- Education: Dickinson College (BA); Pennsylvania State University (JD); University of Virginia (LL.M.)

Richard Barclay Surrick (born December 18, 1937) is a senior United States district judge of the United States District Court for the Eastern District of Pennsylvania.

== Education and career ==
Surrick was born in Media, Pennsylvania. He received a Bachelor of Arts degree from Dickinson College in 1960, and a Juris Doctor from Penn State Dickinson Law in 1965. He was also initiated as a member of the Raven's Claw Society. He was in private practice in Pennsylvania from 1965 to 1977. He was a chief of the appellate division in the Office of the Public Defender of Delaware County, from 1965 to 1974. He was a judge on the Court of Common Pleas of Delaware County from 1978 to 2000. He received a Master of Laws from the University of Virginia School of Law in 1982.

== Federal judicial service ==
On April 11, 2000, Surrick was nominated by President Bill Clinton to a seat on the United States District Court for the Eastern District of Pennsylvania vacated by Judge Lowell A. Reed Jr. Surrick was confirmed by the United States Senate on May 24, 2000, and received his commission on June 5, 2000. He assumed senior status on February 1, 2011.

Legal offices
Preceded by Lowell A. Reed Jr.	Judge of the United States District Court for the Eastern District of Pennsylvania; 2000–2011	Succeeded by Nitza Quiñones Alejandro
