= Edward Eugene Loomis =

American businessman (1864–1937)

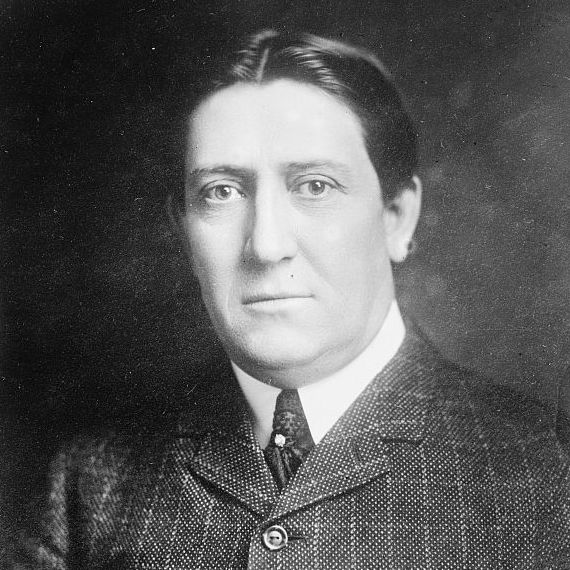
- Loomis c. 1915

President of Lehigh Valley Railroad
- In office 1917–1937

Personal details
- Born: April 2, 1864 German Flatts, New York, U.S.
- Died: July 11, 1937 (aged 73) Murray Hill, New Jersey

Edward Eugene Loomis (April 2, 1864 – July 11, 1937) was President of the Lehigh Valley Railroad from 1917 to 1937.

== Early life and education ==
He was born on April 2, 1864, in German Flatts, New York, to Chester Loomis (1831–1904) and Lydia Esther Norton (1838–1906).

== Career ==
He began his career in the law department of the Denver and Rio Grande Western Railroad. He then worked in the office of the general superintendent of the Erie Railroad. In 1894, he was made superintendent of the Tioga County, Pennsylvania, division of the Erie Railroad. He was then manager of the Blossburg Coal Company. In 1898 he was appointed general superintendent of the New York, Susquehanna and Western Railway and of the Wilkes-Barre and Eastern Railroad. In 1899 the Delaware, Lackawanna and Western Railroad under William Haynes Truesdale was reorganized and Loomis was hired.

He was president of the Lehigh Valley Railroad from 1917 to 1937.

Loomis was a trustee of the American Surety Company. He was director of three New York banks: Liberty National Bank, the Chatham and Phenix Bank and the Coal and Iron National Bank. An executor of the estate of Samuel L. Clemens, he was president and director of the Mark Twain Company. He was director of Temple Iron Company and Prizma. He was treasurer and director of Moses Taylor Hospital and director of the Playground and Recreation Association of America. He was president and director of the Harlem Transfer Company, vice president and director of the Morris and Essex Railroad, vice president and director of the Hoboken Ferry.

== Memberships ==
He was a member of the American Institute of Mining, Metallurgical, and Petroleum Engineers, the Chamber of Commerce of the State of New York, the Metropolitan Club, the Recess Club, the Railroad Club of New York, the Westmoreland Club of Wilkes-Barre, Pennsylvania, the Scranton Club of Scranton, Pennsylvania, the Country Club of Scranton, and Baltusrol Golf Club in Springfield Township, New Jersey.

== Death ==
Loomis died on July 11, 1937, at Holiday Farm, his summer home, in Murray Hill, New Jersey.
