= Malachy E. Mannion =

American judge (born 1953)

Malachy Mannion
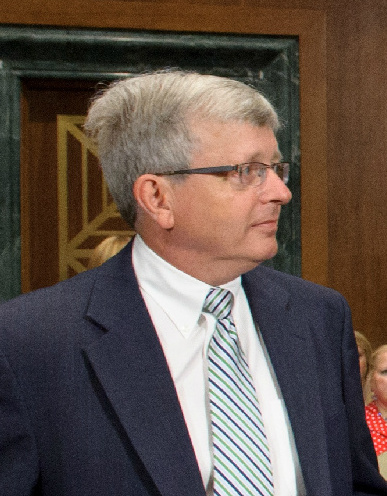
- Mannion in 2012

Senior Judge of the United States District Court for the Middle District of Pennsylvania
- Incumbent
- Assumed office January 3, 2024

Judge of the United States District Court for the Middle District of Pennsylvania
- In office December 27, 2012 – January 3, 2024
- Appointed by: Barack Obama
- Preceded by: A. Richard Caputo
- Succeeded by: Joseph F. Saporito Jr.

Chief Magistrate Judge of the United States District Court for the Middle District of Pennsylvania
- In office 2011–2012

Magistrate Judge of the United States District Court for the Middle District of Pennsylvania
- In office 2001–2012

Personal details
- Born: May 1953 (age 72) Montreal, Quebec, Canada
- Party: Democratic
- Education: University of Scranton (BS); Pace University (JD)

Malachy Edward Mannion (born May 1953) is a senior United States district judge of the United States District Court for the Middle District of Pennsylvania.

== Biography ==
Mannion was born in 1953 in Montreal, Quebec, Canada. He graduated from the Scranton Preparatory School in 1972. He received his Bachelor of Science degree in 1976 from the University of Scranton. He received his Juris Doctor in 1979 from the Pace University School of Law. He began his career as an associate at the law firm of Bartels, Pykett & Aronwald (now Aronwald & Pykett). From 1980 to 1986, he served as an assistant district attorney in the Nassau County District Attorney's Office. He spent most of the period from 1986 to 2001 serving as an assistant United States attorney in the Middle District of Pennsylvania, except from 1993 to 1997, during which he was a partner at the law firm of Hourigan, Kluger, Spohrer & Quinn PC. Mannion was appointed a United States magistrate judge of the United States District Court for the Middle District of Pennsylvania on January 4, 2001, serving until his appointment as district judge. Additionally, he was chief magistrate judge of the district court from 2011 to 2012.

=== Federal judicial service ===
On May 17, 2012, President Barack Obama nominated Mannion to serve as a United States District Judge for the United States District Court for the Middle District of Pennsylvania, to the seat vacated by Judge Richard Caputo, who took senior status in 2009. The Senate Judiciary Committee held a hearing on his nomination on June 27, 2012, and reported it to the floor on July 19, 2012. The Senate confirmed his nomination by unanimous consent on December 21, 2012. He received his commission on December 27, 2012. He assumed senior status on January 3, 2024.

Legal offices
Preceded by A. Richard Caputo	Judge of the United States District Court for the Middle District of Pennsylvania; 2012–2024	Succeeded by Joseph F. Saporito Jr.
