= Lowell A. Reed Jr. =

American judge (1930–2020)

Senior Judge of the United States District Court for the Eastern District of Pennsylvania
- In office June 21, 1999 – April 11, 2020

Judge of the United States District Court for the Eastern District of Pennsylvania
- In office April 20, 1988 – June 21, 1999
- Appointed by: Ronald Reagan
- Preceded by: Anthony Joseph Scirica
- Succeeded by: Richard Barclay Surrick

Personal details
- Born: June 21, 1930 West Chester, Pennsylvania, U.S.
- Died: April 11, 2020 (aged 89) Jenkintown, Pennsylvania, U.S.
- Education: University of Wisconsin (B.B.A.); University of Wisconsin Law School; Temple University Beasley School of Law (J.D.)

Lowell Andrew Reed Jr. (June 21, 1930 – April 11, 2020) was a United States district judge of the United States District Court for the Eastern District of Pennsylvania.

== Education and career ==
Born in West Chester, Pennsylvania, Reed received a Bachelor of Business Administration degree from the University of Wisconsin in 1952 and attended the University of Wisconsin Law School before receiving a Juris Doctor from Temple University Beasley School of Law in 1958. He was in the United States Navy as a Lieutenant Commander of Naval Intelligence from 1953 to 1957. He was a law clerk for Judge Ethan Allen Doty of the Court of Common Pleas in Philadelphia, Pennsylvania in 1958. He was a corporation trial counsel for the PMA Insurance Group in Philadelphia from 1958 to 1962. He was in private practice in Philadelphia from 1963 to 1988. He was a lecturer in law at the Temple University Beasley School of Law from 1966 to 1981. He was on the faculty advisory board of The Academy of Advocacy at Temple University, from 1989 to 2020.

=== Other service ===
Prior to being appointed to the bench, Reed was elected to serve on the Abington School District Board of School Directors and was president of the Rydal-Meadowbrook Civic Association. He has also served as an elder of the Abington Presbyterian Church.

== Federal judicial service ==
Reed was nominated by President Ronald Reagan on December 18, 1987, to a seat on the United States District Court for the Eastern District of Pennsylvania vacated by Judge Anthony Joseph Scirica. He was confirmed by the United States Senate on April 19, 1988, and received his commission on April 20, 1988. He assumed senior status on June 21, 1999. He died on April 11, 2020, of complications from Parkinson's disease. He was 89 years old.

== Sources ==
Legal offices
Preceded by Anthony Joseph Scirica	Judge of the United States District Court for the Eastern District of Pennsylvania; 1988–1999	Succeeded by Richard Barclay Surrick
