= Christopher C. Conner =

American judge (born 1957)

Chief Judge of the United States District Court for the Middle District of Pennsylvania
- In office September 1, 2013 – June 1, 2020
- Preceded by: Yvette Kane
- Succeeded by: John E. Jones III

Judge of the United States District Court for the Middle District of Pennsylvania
- In office July 29, 2002 – January 17, 2025
- Appointed by: George W. Bush
- Preceded by: Sylvia Rambo
- Succeeded by: Keli M. Neary

Personal details
- Born: Christopher Charles Conner; October 25, 1957 (age 68) Harrisburg, Pennsylvania
- Education: Cornell University (BA); Penn State Dickinson Law (JD)

Christopher Charles Conner (born October 25, 1957) is a former United States district judge of the United States District Court for the Middle District of Pennsylvania.

== Education and career ==
Conner was born in Harrisburg, Pennsylvania. He received a Bachelor of Arts degree from Cornell University in 1979 and a Juris Doctor from Pennsylvania State University - Dickinson Law in 1982. He was in private practice in Pennsylvania from 1982 to 2002, and was an adjunct professor at the Widener University School of Law in 2000.

=== Federal judicial service ===
On February 28, 2002, Conner was nominated by President George W. Bush to a seat on the United States District Court for the Middle District of Pennsylvania vacated by Sylvia Rambo. The American Bar Association unanimously rated Connor as "well qualified", its highest rating. Conner was confirmed by the United States Senate by voice vote on July 26, 2002, and received his commission on July 29, 2002. He served as the chief judge from September 1, 2013 to June 1, 2020. He retired from judicial service on January 17, 2025.

=== Notable cases ===
On September 13, 2011, Conner ruled the individual mandate for health insurance in the Patient Protection and Affordable Care Act as unconstitutional saying, in part, “The federal government is one of limited enumerated powers, and Congress’s efforts to remedy the ailing health care and health insurance markets must fit squarely within the boundaries of those powers.”

On August 28, 2022, Connor fined convicted former Luzerne County Juvenile Court judges Mark Ciavarella and Michael Conahan $106 million in compensatory damages and $100 million in punitive damages to nearly 300 people in a long-running civil suit for their role in the Kids for Cash Scandal.

== Sources ==
Legal offices
Preceded by Sylvia Rambo	Judge of the United States District Court for the Middle District of Pennsylvania; 2002–2025	Succeeded by Keli M. Neary
Preceded by Yvette Kane	Chief Judge of the United States District Court for the Middle District of Pennsylvania; 2013–2020	Succeeded by John E. Jones III
