= Jack Keeney =

American prosecutor (1922–2011)

John Christopher "Jack" Keeney (February 19, 1922 – November 19, 2011) was an American prosecutor who retired in 2010 as U.S. deputy United States Assistant Attorney General. At age 88, he was at the time the DOJ's oldest employee, and one of the longest-serving career employees in the history of the United States government. Upon his retirement, Keeney was the longest-serving federal prosecutor in American history.

Keeney spent decades in the United States Department of Justice Criminal Division, starting in 1951. On numerous occasions, Keeney served as Acting Assistant Attorney General.

Keeney was born in Ashley, Pennsylvania, on February 19, 1922. Keeney was a pilot in the Army Air Corps during World War II, and was held by German forces as a prisoner of war. Keeney graduated from the University of Scranton in 1947. He received law degrees from Dickinson School of Law in 1949 and from George Washington University Law School in 1953.

== Honors ==
In 2000, the Justice Department named one of its buildings (1301 New York Avenue, N.W., Washington, D.C.) after Keeney, an honor rarely bestowed on a living person.

In the month following his death, the Justice Department created the John C. Keeney Award for Exceptional Integrity and Professionalism. The John C. Keeney Award recognizes a Justice Department employee who has demonstrated outstanding professionalism and integrity over a sustained period of time or an employee who has displayed extraordinary strength of character in a unique situation, as Mr. Keeney displayed during his years of service to the federal government.

== Death ==
Keeney died on November 19, 2011, at his home in Kensington, Maryland, aged 89.
