= William Joseph Nealon Jr. =

American judge (1923–2018)

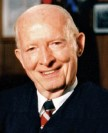

Senior Judge of the United States District Court for the Middle District of Pennsylvania
- In office January 1, 1989 – August 30, 2018

Chief Judge of the United States District Court for the Middle District of Pennsylvania
- In office 1976–1989
- Preceded by: Michael Henry Sheridan
- Succeeded by: Richard Paul Conaboy

Judge of the United States District Court for the Middle District of Pennsylvania
- In office December 13, 1962 – January 1, 1989
- Appointed by: John F. Kennedy
- Preceded by: John W. Murphy
- Succeeded by: James Focht McClure Jr.

Personal details
- Born: July 31, 1923 Scranton, Pennsylvania, U.S.
- Died: August 30, 2018 (aged 95) Scranton, Pennsylvania, U.S.
- Education: Villanova University (B.S.); Columbus School of Law (LL.B.)

William Joseph Nealon Jr. (July 31, 1923 – August 30, 2018) was an American jurist who was United States district judge of the United States District Court for the Middle District of Pennsylvania. He was the last judicial appointee from the Kennedy administration remaining on the federal bench and among the longest-serving federal judges in history, with over 26 years of active service and nearly 56 years of total service.

== Education and career ==
Born on July 31, 1923, in Scranton, Pennsylvania, Nealon was a First Lieutenant in the United States Marine Corps during World War II, from 1942 to 1945. He received a Bachelor of Science degree from Villanova University in 1947 and a Bachelor of Laws from the Columbus School of Law at the Catholic University of America in 1950. He was in private practice in Scranton from 1951 to 1960, also lecturing at the University of Scranton from 1951 to 1959. He was a hearing examiner for the Pennsylvania Liquor Control Board from 1955 to 1959. He was a judge on the Lackawanna County Court of Common Pleas from 1960 to 1962.

== Federal judicial service ==
On December 13, 1962, Nealon received a recess appointment from President John F. Kennedy to a seat on the United States District Court for the Middle District of Pennsylvania vacated by John W. Murphy. Formally nominated on January 15, 1963, Nealon was confirmed by the United States Senate on March 15, 1963, and received his commission on March 27, 1963. He served as Chief Judge from 1976 to 1989, assuming senior status on January 1, 1989, and died on August 30, 2018, in Scranton.

== Honor ==
The William J. Nealon Federal Building and United States Courthouse, located in Scranton, is named in his honor.

== See also ==
- List of United States federal judges by longevity of service

== Sources ==
Legal offices
Preceded by John W. Murphy	Judge of the United States District Court for the Middle District of Pennsylvania; 1962–1989	Succeeded by James Focht McClure Jr.
Preceded by Michael Henry Sheridan	Chief Judge of the United States District Court for the Middle District of Pennsylvania; 1976–1989	Succeeded by Richard Paul Conaboy
