= Herman T. Schneebeli Federal Building and Courthouse =

Coordinates: 41°14′21.8″N 77°00′19.9″W

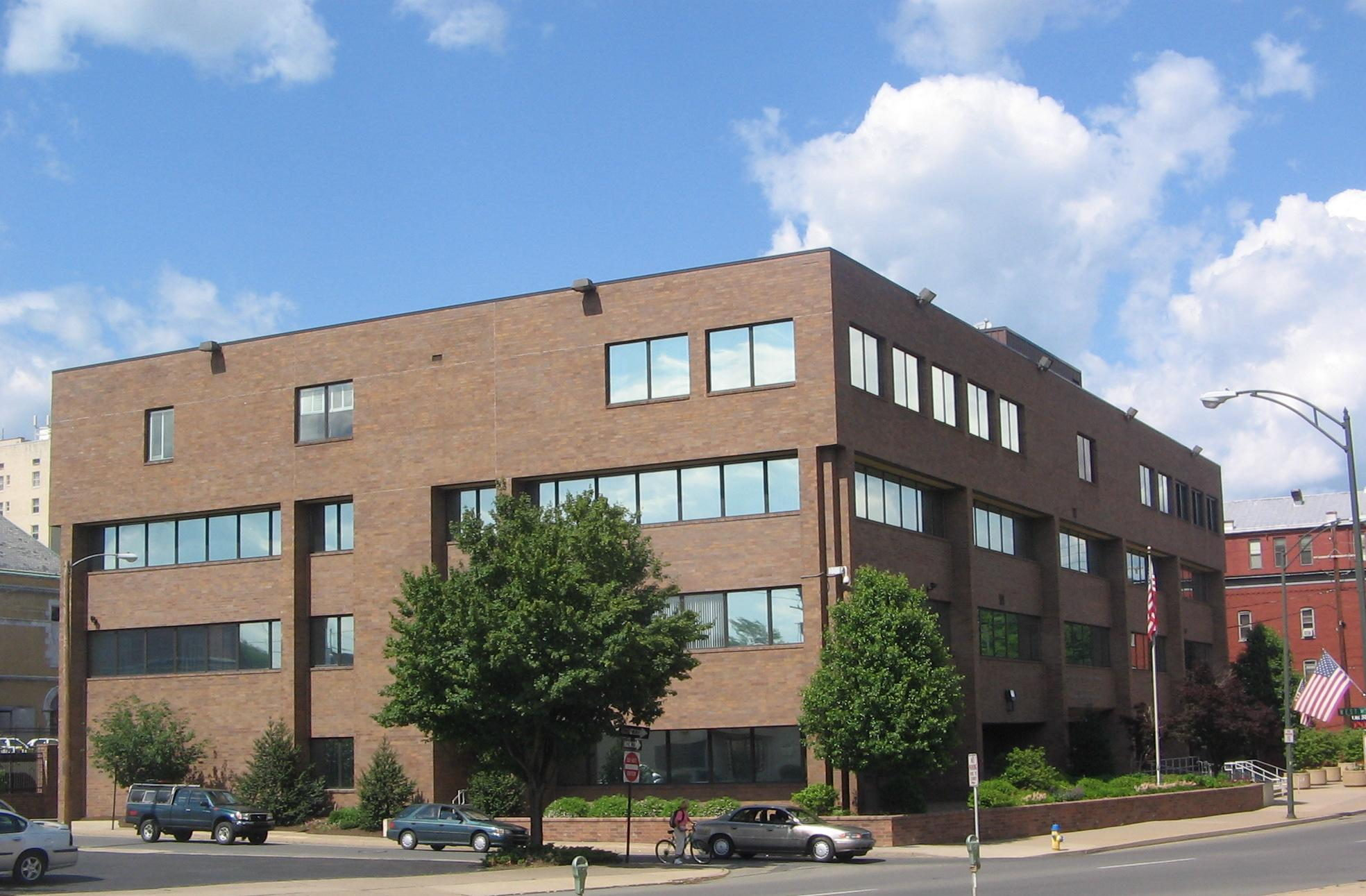
The Herman T. Schneebeli Federal Buildings and United States Courthouse in 2006.

The Herman T. Schneebeli Federal Building and United States Courthouse is a federal building and courthouse in Williamsport, Pennsylvania. It is one of four locations that are part of the United States District Court for the Middle District of Pennsylvania. The Herman T. Schneebeli Federal Building and Courthouse was opened in 1977 and was named after United States Representative Herman T. Schneebeli.

In 2019 the courthouse was home to the Bill Courtright bribery, extortion and criminal conspiracy case.

== See also ==
- List of United States federal courthouses
- Lycoming County, Pennsylvania
