= Yvette Kane =

American judge (born 1953)

Senior Judge of the United States District Court for the Middle District of Pennsylvania
- Incumbent
- Assumed office October 11, 2018

Chief Judge of the United States District Court for the Middle District of Pennsylvania
- In office September 1, 2006 – August 31, 2013
- Preceded by: Thomas I. Vanaskie
- Succeeded by: Christopher C. Conner

Judge of the United States District Court for the Middle District of Pennsylvania
- In office October 22, 1998 – October 11, 2018
- Appointed by: Bill Clinton
- Preceded by: Edwin Michael Kosik
- Succeeded by: Jennifer P. Wilson

Personal details
- Born: Yvette Pregeant; October 11, 1953 (age 72) Donaldsonville, Louisiana, U.S.
- Education: Nicholls State University (BA); Tulane University (JD)

Yvette Kane (née Pregeant; born October 11, 1953) is a senior United States district judge of the United States District Court for the Middle District of Pennsylvania.

== Early life and education ==
Kane was born in Donaldsonville, Louisiana. After graduating high school at age 15, Kane received a Bachelor of Arts degree in Sociology from Nicholls State University in 1973 and a Juris Doctor from Tulane University Law School in 1976.

== Legal career ==
Following law school graduation, Kane was a trial attorney at the United States Equal Employment Opportunity Commission from 1977 to 1978 and an Assistant State Attorney General in the Colorado Attorney General's Office from 1978 to 1980. Kane then served as deputy district attorney in Denver from 1980 to 1986.

After moving to Harrisburg, Pennsylvania, Kane became a deputy attorney general to the Pennsylvania Attorney General from 1986 to 1991. She was a chief counsel of the Independent Regulatory Review Commission from 1991 to 1992. She was a private practice lawyer in Harrisburg from 1993 to 1995. She then served as Secretary of the Commonwealth of Pennsylvania from 1995 to 1998, under former Governor Tom Ridge.

== Federal judicial career ==
On June 4, 1998, President Bill Clinton nominated Kane to a seat on the United States District Court for the Middle District of Pennsylvania, which had been vacated by Edwin Michael Kosik. She was confirmed by the United States Senate on October 21, 1998, and received her commission on October 22, 1998. Kane served as Chief Judge of the United States District Court for the Middle District of Pennsylvania from 2006 to 2013. She assumed senior status on October 11, 2018, her 65th birthday.

== Sources ==
- Website of Judge Yvette Kane
- Appearances on C-SPAN

Legal offices
Preceded by Edwin Michael Kosik	Judge of the United States District Court for the Middle District of Pennsylvania; 1998–2018	Succeeded by Jennifer P. Wilson
Preceded by Thomas I. Vanaskie	Chief Judge of the United States District Court for the Middle District of Pennsylvania; 2006–2013	Succeeded by Christopher C. Conner
