= Ronald Reagan Federal Building and Courthouse (Pennsylvania) =

Coordinates: 40.2616°N 76.8828°W

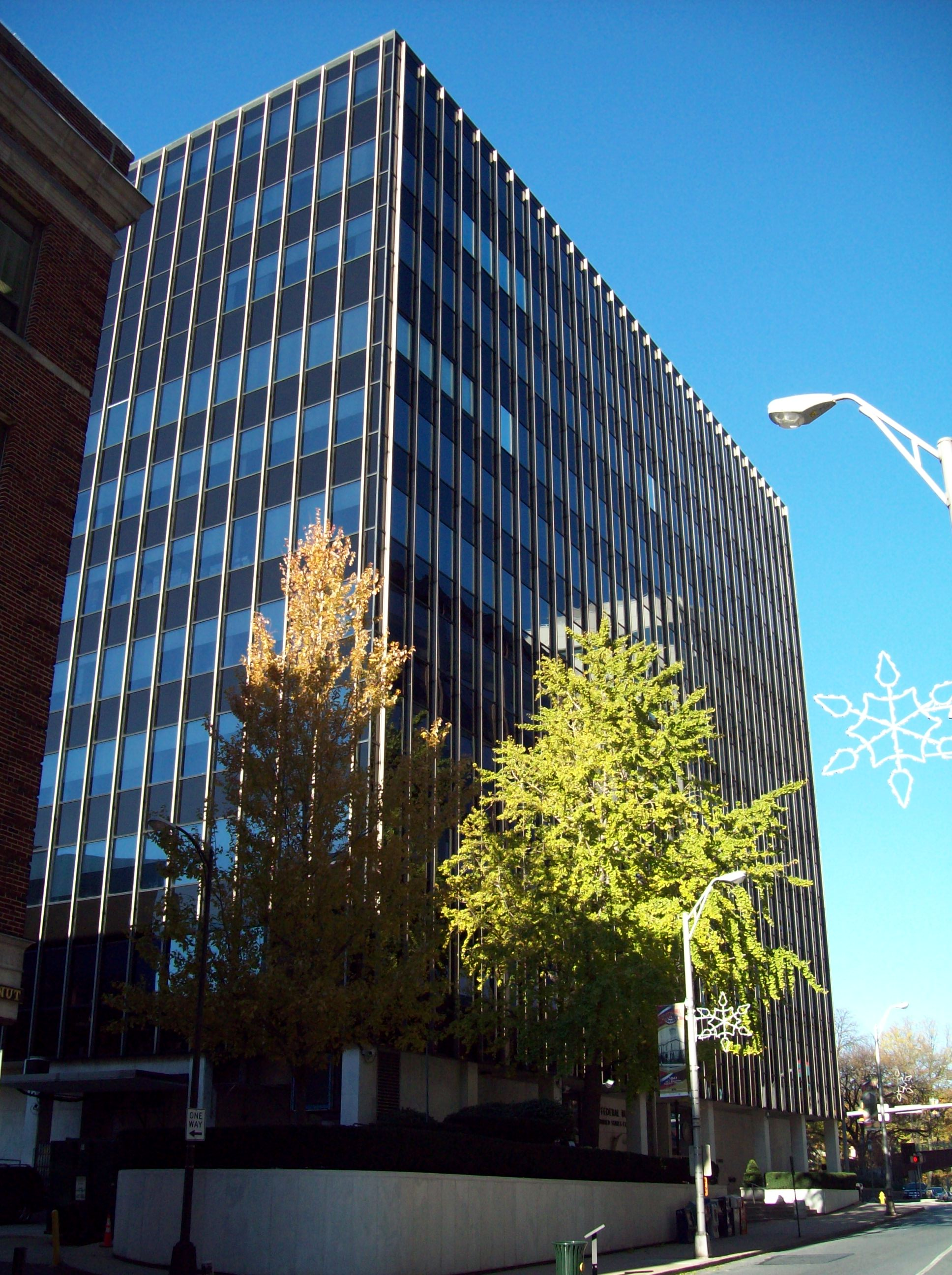
The Federal Building in Harrisburg was home to the United States District Court for the Middle District of Pennsylvania before being relocated to the new Sylvia H. Rambo U.S. Courthouse.

The Ronald Reagan Federal Building and Courthouse (Federal Building for short) at 228 Walnut Street in Harrisburg, Pennsylvania is a twelve-story former courts facility located in the central business district of the city. The building, built in 1966, is named for former President Ronald Reagan. It was officially renamed on March 9, 2004. The United States District Court for the Middle District of Pennsylvania, a district level federal court with jurisdiction over approximately one half of Pennsylvania, was housed within the building until April 2023 when it was moved to the new Sylvia H. Rambo U.S. Courthouse. The building was listed on the National Register of Historic Places in 2026.

== Expansion project ==
In early 1993, the General Services Administration (GSA) identified the need for expansion or replacement of the current federal building and announced a long range plan for construction of a new building. Between 2004 and 2007, site selection proceeded for a location in Harrisburg for the new courthouse; however, all of the locations originally suggested by the GSA would have resulted in the demolition or relocation of residents, businesses and in one case, a large public housing complex. Local opposition by community leaders, including former city mayor Stephen R. Reed, have stalled the project. On October 1, 2007 it was announced by the GSA that the current structure located in downtown, would be demolished and be replaced with a new federal courthouse building. On April 26, 2010, the site of North 6th and Reily was announced as the chosen site for the new U.S. Courthouse in Harrisburg, Pennsylvania. In 2019, the Ronald Reagan Federal Building and Courthouse, (228 Walnut Street) was one of fourteen Federal Properties listed for disposal by the Public Building Reform Board.

== Sale and renovation ==
In December 2022, the building was purchased at auction by new owner Global Ocean Investments, where plans were announced to renovate the building (to be named "The Federal") into luxury apartments following the vacation of the Federal Government, with attractions including two restaurants, two bars, a rooftop swimming pool, and a health club. After being sold again in February 2023, plans were approved by Harrisburg City Council to renovate the building into a 162-unit apartment building with construction to begin summer 2024.

== Gallery ==
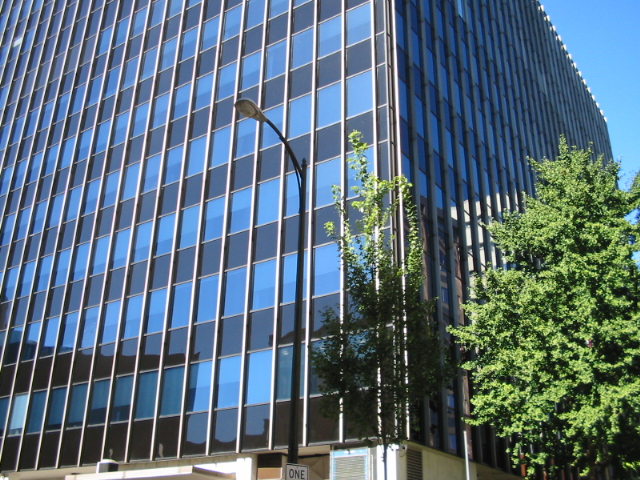
Detail of The Ronald Reagan Federal Building and Courthouse facade

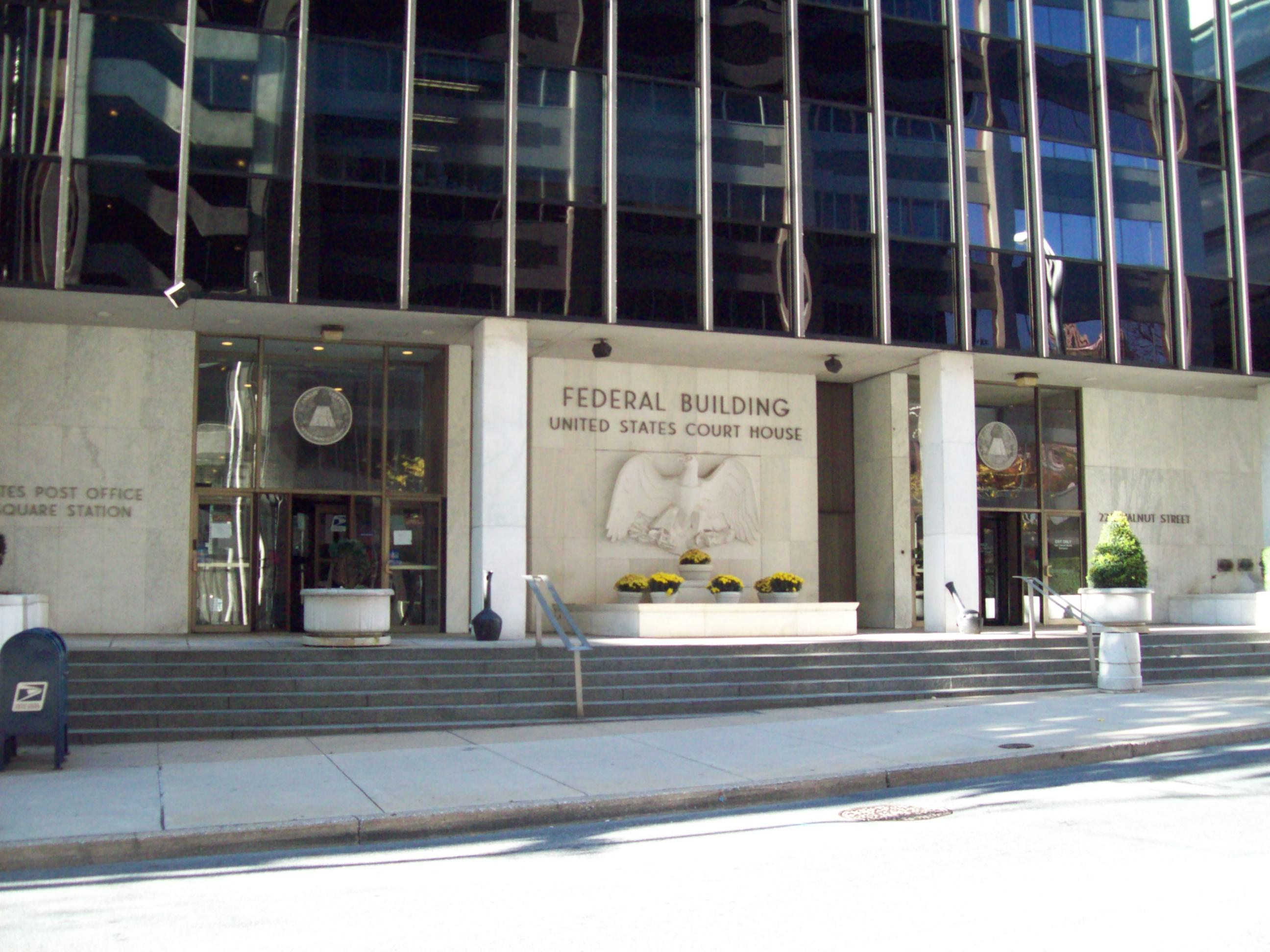
Detail of The Ronald Reagan Federal Building and Courthouse entry
