= Pennsylvania Bar Association =

Voluntary bar association in Pennsylvania, USA

- Logo of the Pennsylvania Bar Association
- Formation: July 1, 1895
- Type: Legal Society
- Headquarters: Philadelphia (1895-1933); Harrisburg (1933-present) Pittsburgh (2016-present)
- Location: United States
- Members: Pennsylvania-licensed lawyers
- President: Kristen Hamilton
- President-Elect: James R. Antoniono
- Website: http://www.pabar.org/

The Pennsylvania Bar Association (PBA) is a voluntary bar association of lawyers and law students in Pennsylvania, United States. The association offers membership benefits, including publications, practice support, networking, and continuing education.

== Membership requirements ==
Membership into the Pennsylvania Bar Association is open to any lawyer who is in good standing and licensed by the bar of Pennsylvania. Associate membership is open to attorneys in good standing licensed in other states but not licensed in Pennsylvania. The association also offers free law student memberships for current law students.

== Organization ==
The association has several executive officers, including president, president-elect and vice president. It was incorporated on July 9, 1895

== Pennsylvania Bar Foundation ==
The Pennsylvania Bar Foundation is the 501(c)(3) charitable affiliate of the Pennsylvania Bar Association. It was incorporated in 1984 with the purpose of assisting the association to be involved with public service. The foundation is managed by 23 voting members of its board of directors. Financial support of the foundation comes from voluntary contributions.

== Young Lawyers Division ==
The Young Lawyers Division of the Pennsylvania Bar Association is for members who are age 40 or younger or who have been practicing law for less than five years. Membership is free and automatic for members who meet the age and practice criteria.

== Gallery ==
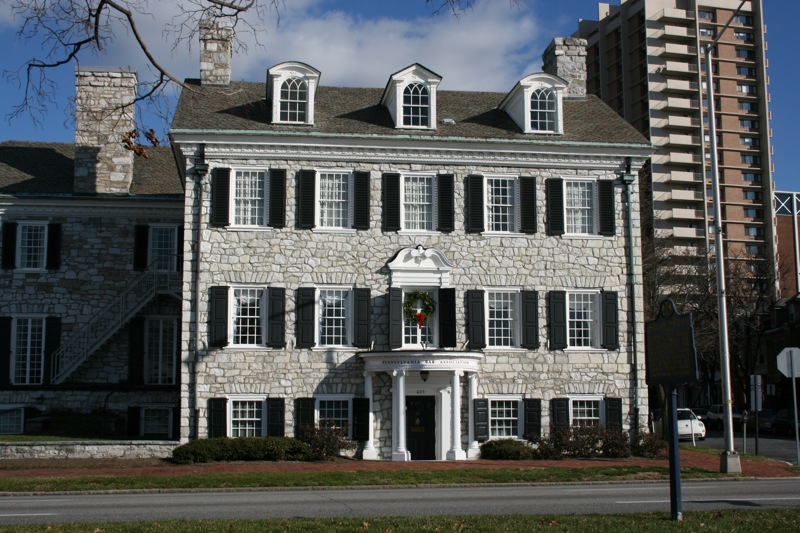
Pennsylvania Bar Association headquarters in Harrisburg, Pennsylvania
