= United States District Court for the Middle District of Pennsylvania =

United States federal district court in Pennsylvania

- (M.D. Pa.)
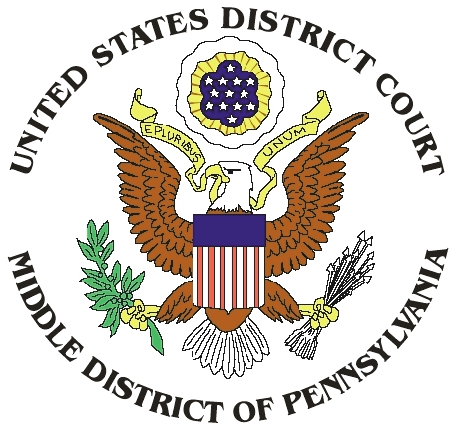

- Location: Sylvia H. Rambo United States Courthouse (Harrisburg) More locations: William J. Nealon Federal Building and U.S. Courthouse (Scranton); Williamsport; Wilkes-Barre; Lewisburg
- Appeals to: Third Circuit
- Established: March 2, 1901
- Judges: 6
- Chief Judge: Matthew W. Brann

Officers of the court
- U.S. Attorney: Brian Miller
- U.S. Marshal: William M. Pugh
- www.pamd.uscourts.gov

The United States District Court for the Middle District of Pennsylvania (in case citations, M.D. Pa.) is a district level federal court with jurisdiction over approximately one half of Pennsylvania. The court was created in 1901 by subdividing the United States District Court for the Eastern District of Pennsylvania and the United States District Court for the Western District of Pennsylvania. The court is under the jurisdiction of the United States Court of Appeals for the Third Circuit (except for patent claims and claims against the U.S. government under the Tucker Act, which are appealed to the Federal Circuit).

Because Harrisburg, the state capital, is located within the district's jurisdiction, most federal suits against the Commonwealth of Pennsylvania are filed in the Middle District. Similarly, because York County Prison served as the largest Immigration and Naturalization Service (INS) facility in the Northeast, the Middle District also adjudicated many immigration cases. The courts of appeal are now responsible for most judicial review of immigration decisions, bypassing the Middle District and other district courts.

Judge Matthew W. Brann is the chief judge for the Middle District of Pennsylvania; William M. Pugh is the United States marshal for the Middle District of Pennsylvania. As of January 21, 2025, the U.S. attorney is Brian Miller.

== History ==
The United States District Court for the District of Pennsylvania was one of the original 13 courts established by the Judiciary Act of 1789, 1 Stat. 73, on September 24, 1789. It was subdivided on April 20, 1818, by 3 Stat. 462, into the Eastern and Western Districts to be headquartered in Philadelphia and Pittsburgh, respectively. Portions of these districts were subsequently subdivided into the Middle District on March 2, 1901, by 31 Stat. 880.

== Current judges ==
As of January 17, 2025:

| # | Title | Judge | Duty station | Born | Term of service | | | Appointed by |
| # | Title | Judge | Duty station | Born | Active | Chief | Senior | Appointed by |
|---|---|---|---|---|---|---|---|---|
| 24 | Chief Judge | Matthew W. Brann | Williamsport | 1965 | 2012–present | 2021–present | — | Obama |
| 25 | District Judge | Jennifer P. Wilson | Harrisburg | 1975 | 2019–present | — | — | Trump |
| 26 | District Judge | Julia K. Munley | Scranton | 1965 | 2023–present | — | — | Biden |
| 27 | District Judge | Karoline Mehalchick | Scranton | 1976 | 2024–present | — | — | Biden |
| 28 | District Judge | Joseph F. Saporito Jr. | Wilkes-Barre | 1960 | 2024–present | — | — | Biden |
| 29 | District Judge | Keli M. Neary | Harrisburg | 1981 | 2025–present | — | — | Biden |
| 18 | Senior Judge | Yvette Kane | Harrisburg | 1953 | 1998–2018 | 2006–2013 | 2018–present | Clinton |
| 22 | Senior Judge | Robert D. Mariani | Scranton | 1950 | 2011–2022 | — | 2022–present | Obama |
| 23 | Senior Judge | Malachy E. Mannion | Scranton | 1953 | 2012–2024 | — | 2024–present | Obama |

== Former judges ==
| # | Judge | Born–died | Active service | Chief Judge | Senior status | Appointed by | Reason for termination |
|---|---|---|---|---|---|---|---|
| 1 | Robert W. Archbald | 1848–1926 | 1901–1911 | — | — | McKinley | elevation |
| 2 | Charles B. Witmer | 1862–1925 | 1911–1925 | — | — | Taft | death |
| 3 | Albert Williams Johnson | 1872–1957 | 1925–1945 | — | — | Coolidge | resignation |
| 4 | Albert Leisenring Watson | 1876–1960 | 1929–1955 | 1948–1955 | 1955–1960 | Hoover | death |
| 5 | John W. Murphy | 1902–1962 | 1946–1962 | 1955–1962 | — | Truman | death |
| 6 | Frederick Voris Follmer | 1885–1971 | 1946–1967 (Note: From 1946 to 1955 Judge Follmer was jointly appointed to the Eastern, Middle, and Western Districts of Pennsylvania) | 1962 | 1967–1971 | Truman | death |
| 7 | Michael Henry Sheridan | 1912–1976 | 1961–1976 | 1962–1976 | — | Kennedy | death |
| 8 | William Joseph Nealon Jr. | 1923–2018 | 1962–1989 (Note: Recess appointment; formally nominated on January 15, 1963, confirmed by the United States Senate on March 15, 1963, and received commission on March 27, 1963.) | 1976–1989 | 1989–2018 | Kennedy | death |
| 9 | Robert Dixon Herman | 1911–1990 | 1969–1981 | — | 1981–1990 | Nixon | death |
| 10 | Malcolm Muir | 1914–2011 | 1970–1984 | — | 1984–2011 | Nixon | death |
| 11 | Richard Paul Conaboy | 1925–2018 | 1979–1992 | 1989–1992 | 1992–2018 | Carter | death |
| 12 | Sylvia Rambo | 1936–2024 | 1979–2001 | 1992–1999 | 2001–2024 | Carter | retirement |
| 13 | William W. Caldwell | 1925–2019 | 1982–1994 | — | 1994–2019 | Reagan | death |
| 14 | Edwin Michael Kosik | 1925–2019 | 1986–1996 | — | 1996–2019 | Reagan | death |
| 15 | James Focht McClure Jr. | 1931–2010 | 1990–2001 | — | 2001–2010 | G.H.W. Bush | death |
| 16 | Thomas I. Vanaskie | 1953–present | 1994–2010 | 1999–2006 | — | Clinton | elevation |
| 17 | A. Richard Caputo | 1938–2020 | 1997–2009 | — | 2009–2020 | Clinton | death |
| 19 | James Martin Munley | 1936–2020 | 1998–2009 | — | 2009–2020 | Clinton | death |
| 20 | Christopher C. Conner | 1957–present | 2002–2025 | 2013–2020 | — | G.W. Bush | retirement |
| 21 | John E. Jones III | 1955–present | 2002–2021 | 2020–2021 | — | G.W. Bush | retirement |

== Chief judges ==
Chief judges have administrative responsibilities with respect to their district court. Unlike the Supreme Court, where one justice is specifically nominated to be chief, the office of chief judge rotates among the district court judges. To be chief, a judge must have been in active service on the court for at least one year, be under the age of 65, and have not previously served as chief judge.

A vacancy is filled by the judge highest in seniority among the group of qualified judges. The chief judge serves for a term of seven years, or until age 70, whichever occurs first. The age restrictions are waived if no members of the court would otherwise be qualified for the position.

When the office was created in 1948, the chief judge was the longest-serving judge who had not elected to retire, on what has since 1958 been known as senior status, or declined to serve as chief judge. After August 6, 1959, judges could not become or remain chief after turning 70 years old. The current rules have been in operation since October 1, 1982.

== Succession of seats ==
Seat 1
Seat established on March 2, 1901 by 31 Stat. 880
| Archbald | 1901–1911 |
| Witmer | 1911–1925 |
| Johnson | 1925–1945 |
| Murphy | 1946–1962 |
| Nealon, Jr. | 1963–1989 |
| McClure, Jr. | 1990–2001 |
| Jones III | 2002–2021 |
| Mehalchick | 2024–present |

Seat 2
Seat established on February 28, 1929 by 45 Stat. 1344
| Watson | 1929–1955 |
Seat abolished on May 31, 1955 pursuant to 68 Stat. 8

Seat 3
Seat established on July 24, 1946 by 60 Stat. 654 (temporary) (concurrent with Eastern and Western districts)
Seat became permanent upon the abolition of Seat 2 on May 31, 1955
Seat reassigned solely to the Middle District on June 1, 1955
| Follmer | 1946–1967 |
| Herman | 1969–1981 |
| Caldwell II | 1982–1994 |
| J.M. Munley | 1998–2009 |
| Mariani | 2011–2022 |
| J.K. Munley | 2023–present |

Seat 4
Seat established on May 19, 1961 by 75 Stat. 80
| Sheridan | 1961–1976 |
Seat abolished on August 23, 1976 (temporary judgeship expired)

Seat 5
Seat established on June 2, 1970 by 84 Stat. 294 (temporary)
Seat became permanent upon the abolition of Seat 4 on August 23, 1976
| Muir | 1970–1984 |
| Kosik | 1986–1996 |
| Kane | 1998–2018 |
| Wilson | 2019–present |

Seat 6
Seat established on October 20, 1978 by 92 Stat. 1629
| Conaboy | 1979–1992 |
| Caputo | 1997–2009 |
| Mannion | 2012–2024 |
| Saporito Jr. | 2024–present |

Seat 7
Seat established on October 20, 1978 by 92 Stat. 1629
| Rambo | 1979–2001 |
| Conner | 2002–2025 |
| Neary | 2025–present |

Seat 8
Seat established on December 1, 1990 by 104 Stat. 5089
| Vanaskie | 1994–2010 |
| Brann | 2012–present |

== Notable cases ==
- Donald J. Trump for President v. Boockvar, et al., 502 F. Supp. 3d 899 (M.D. Pa. 2020) (affirmed by the United States Court of Appeals for the Third Circuit in a non-precedential opinion, No. 20-3371 (November 2020)).
- Irvis v. Scott, 318 F. Supp. 1246 (M.D. Pa. 1970) (affirmed by the US Supreme court in 1972 as Moose Lodge No. 107 v. Irvis, 407 U.S. 163 (1972))
- Kitzmiller v. Dover Area School District
- Lozano et al. v. City of Hazleton, M.D. Pa. No. 3:06-cv-01586-JMM (2006) (affirmed in part by the United States Court of Appeals for the Third Circuit, No. 07-3531 (September 9, 2010)).
- Whitewood v. Wolf This case struck down Pennsylvania's statutory ban on same-sex marriage on May 20, 2014. This was not appealed to the Third Circuit.

== List of U.S. attorneys ==
The people in the district are represented by the United States attorney for the Middle District of Pennsylvania.

- Samuel McCarrell (1901–1908)
- Charles B. Witmer (1908–1911)
- Andrew B. Dunsmore (1911–1914)
- Rogers L. Burnett (1914–1921)
- Andrew B. Dunsmore (1921–1934)
- Frank J. McDonnell (1934–1935)
- Frederick V. Follmer (1935–1946)
- Arthur A. Maguire (1946–1953)
- Joseph C. Kreder (1953)
- Julius Levy (1953–1957)
- Robert J. Hourigan (1957–1958)
- Daniel Jenkins (1958–1961)
- Bernard J. Brown (1961–1969)
- John Cottone (1969–1979)
- Carlon M. O'Malley Jr. (1979–1982)
- David Dart Queen (1982–1985)
- James J. West (1985–1993)
- Wayne P. Samuelson (1993)
- David Barasch (1993–2001)
- Martin Carlson (2001–2002)
- Tom Marino (2002–2007)
- Martin Carlson (2007–2009)
- Dennis Pfannenschmidt (2009–2010)
- Peter J. Smith (2010–2016)
- Bruce D. Brandler (2016–2017)
- David Freed (2017–2021)
- Bruce D. Brandler (2021–2022)
- Gerard Karam (2022–2025)
- John C. Gurganus (2025)
- Brian Miller (2025–present)

== Courthouses ==
Within the Middle District, federal courthouses are located in:

- Harrisburg – Sylvia H. Rambo United States Courthouse
- Scranton – William J. Nealon Federal Building and United States Courthouse
- Williamsport – Herman T. Schneebeli Federal Building and Courthouse
- Wilkes-Barre – Max Rosenn U.S. Courthouse
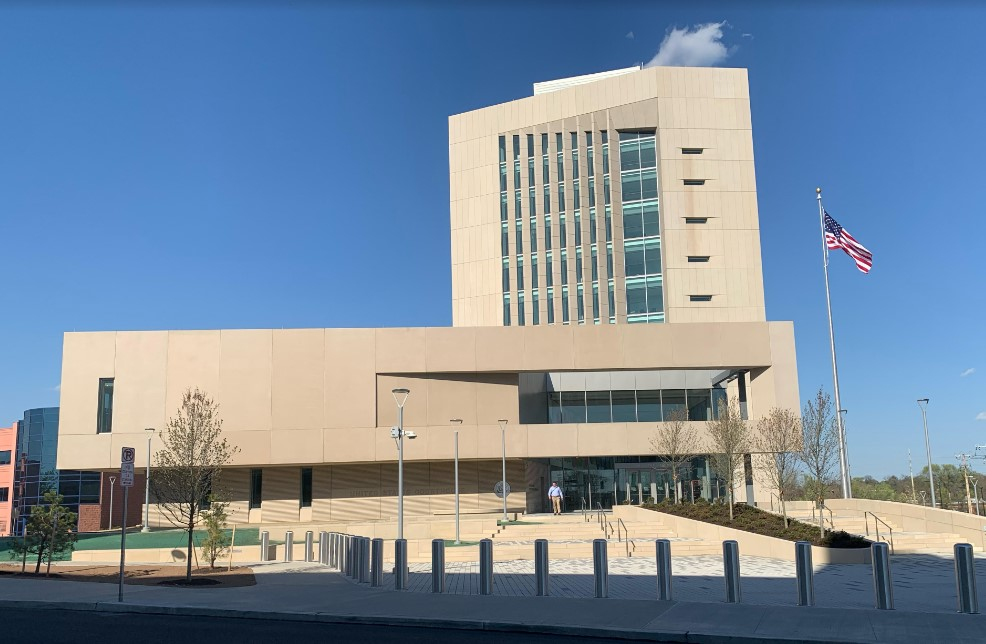
The Sylvia H. Rambo United States Courthouse in Harrisburg, Dauphin County, PA

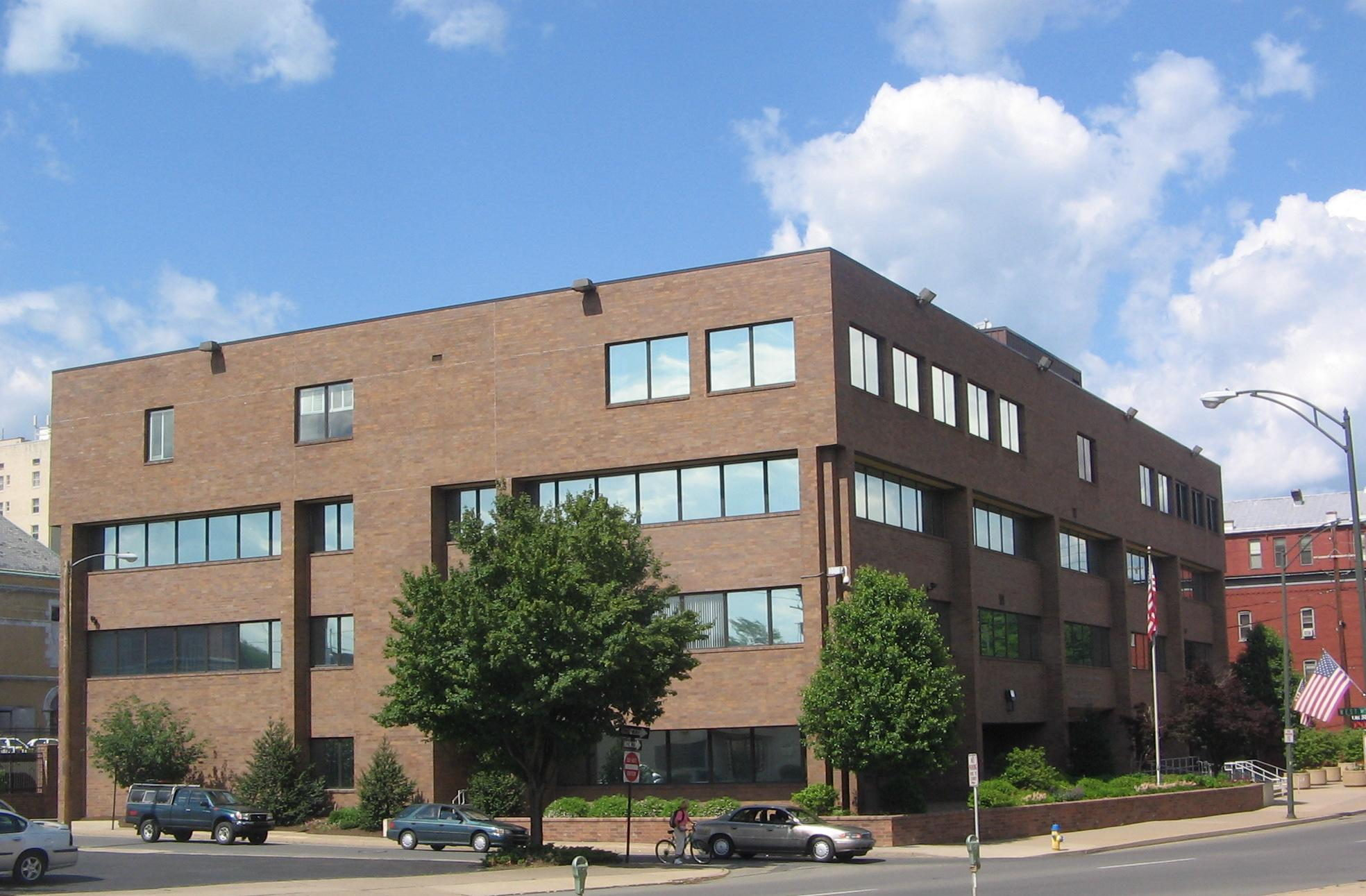
The Herman T. Schneebeli Federal Building and Courthouse in Williamsport, Lycoming County, PA

== Counties of jurisdiction ==
The Court's jurisdiction includes the following counties:

- Adams County
- Bradford County
- Cameron County
- Carbon County
- Centre County
- Clinton County
- Columbia County
- Cumberland County
- Dauphin County
- Franklin County
- Fulton County
- Huntingdon County
- Juniata County
- Lackawanna County
- Lebanon County
- Luzerne County
- Lycoming County
- Mifflin County
- Monroe County
- Montour County
- Northumberland County
- Perry County
- Pike County
- Potter County
- Schuylkill County
- Snyder County
- Sullivan County
- Susquehanna County
- Tioga County
- Union County
- Wayne County
- Wyoming County
- York County

== See also ==
- Courts of Pennsylvania
- List of current United States district judges
- List of United States federal courthouses in Pennsylvania
