= Jacki =

Jacki is a given name.

== People with the given name ==
- Jacki (art director), Indian film Production Designer
- Jacki Apple, American artist, writer, composer, producer and educator
- Jacki R. Chan, American actress
- Jacki Clérico, French businessman
- Jacki Cooper, Australian jazz singer
- Jacki Gemelos (born 1988), Greek-American basketball player
- Jacki Lyden, American journalist and author
- Jacki MacDonald, Australian television presenter
- Jacki Marsh, American politician
- Jacki McInnes (born 1966), South African artist
- Jacki Nichol, Canadian softball player
- Jacki Parry (born 1941), Australian artist
- Jacki Piper (born 1946), English actress
- Jacki Ochs, American filmmaker
- Jacki Randall (born 1959), American cartoonist
- Jäcki Reznicek, German bassist
- Jacki Rickert, American cannabis rights activist
- Jacki Schechner, American television personality
- Jacki Sorensen, Originator of aerobic dancing
- Jacki Weaver (born 1947), Australian actress
- Jacki Zehner (born 1964), Canadian philanthropist and financer

== See also ==
- Jackie (given name)
- Jaci (disambiguation)
- Jaki, a given name
- Jack (given name)
