= ABI =

ABI, abi, or Abi may refer to:

== Medical ==
- Acquired brain injury, brain damage caused by events after birth
- Ankle–brachial index, the ratio of the blood pressure at the ankle and upper arm
- Auditory brainstem implant, for sensation of sound

== Organizations ==
=== United States ===
- American Bankruptcy Institute
- American Beverage Institute
- American Biographical Institute
- Applied Biosystems Inc.

=== Elsewhere ===
- African Beauty International, is a South African national beauty pageant organization
- Agencia Boliviana de Información, a Bolivian press agency
- Anheuser-Busch InBev, a multinational Belgian-Brazilian beverage and brewing company
- Association of British Insurers
- Associazione Bancaria Italiana, a trade association of Italian banks

== People ==
- Abi (actor) (1965–2017), Indian impressionist, comedian, and actor
- Abi (singer) (born 1997), American country singer/songwriter
- Abi Kusno Nachran (1940–2006), Indonesian environmental activist
- Abi Masatora (born 1994), Japanese sumo wrestler
- Abigail (name), includes several people known as Abi
- Abijah (queen), mother of King Hezekiah, called Abi once in the Quran
- Charles Abi (born 2000), Togolese footballer
- Mustafa Abi (born 1979), Turkish basketball player

== Places ==
- Abi, Iran, a village in Zanjan Province
- Abi, Cross River, Nigeria
- Abi (Cholo), a mountain in Nepal

== Technology ==
- Application binary interface, an interface to software defined in terms of in-process, machine code access
- Advanced Baseline Imager, on the GOES-R satellite

== Other uses ==
- ABI (military land vehicle), a Romanian armored car
- Abitur, commonly known as Abi, a German educational qualification
- Arabian Business International, a magazine
- Agile business intelligence, a business intelligence software technique
- Abidji, a Kwa language spoken in Ivory Coast (ISO 639-3 language code: abi)
- Abilene Regional Airport, Texas, US (IATA airport code: ABI)

== See also ==
- ABI1, Abelson interactor 1
- ABI2, Abelson interactor 2
- ABI3, Abelson interactor 3
- Abbi (disambiguation)
- Abis (disambiguation)
- AB1 (disambiguation), "AB" and digit "1"
