= ABL =

ABL may refer to:

== Arts and media ==
- A Beautiful Lie, 30 Seconds to Mars's second studio album
- A Bug's Life, a 1998 film
- A Bug's Life (video game), the video game based on the film

== Businesses and organizations ==
- ABL Space Systems
- Air Busan of South Korea (ICAO airline code)
- Alameda Belt Line railroad
- Allegany Ballistics Laboratory
- NSW Business Chamber, formerly Australian Business Limited, a business organisation
- Academia Brasileira de Letras (Brazilian Academy of Letters)
- Allied Bank Limited, a Pakistani bank
- Ambler Airport in Alaska, US (IATA airport code ABL)

== Science and technology ==
=== Computing ===
- A Block diagram Language, a hardware description language
- Advanced Business Language, the new name for Progress 4GL
- OpenEdge Advanced Business Language, a business application development language created and maintained by Progress Software Corporation

=== Medicine ===
- ABL (gene), a proto-oncogene associated with chronic myelogenous leukemia
- Abetalipoproteinemia, a rare genetic disorder
- Accidental bowel leakage, also known as fecal incontinence

=== Other uses in science and technology ===
- Airborne Laser, a weapons system designed for use by the US military
- Armored Box Launcher, a launch container for the BGM-109 Tomahawk cruise missile
- Atmospheric boundary layer, the region where the atmosphere interacts with the surface of the earth
- Australian bat lyssavirus, a rabies-like virus found in Australian bats

== Sports ==
- African Basketball League
- Alaska Baseball League
- American Basketball League, a name that has been used by three defunct basketball leagues in the US:
  - American Basketball League (1925–1955), an early professional basketball league
  - American Basketball League (1961–1962), a league that only played a single full season
  - American Basketball League (1996–1998), a women's basketball league
  - American Basketball League (2013–2015), a semi-professional men's basketball league
- ASEAN Basketball League, a professional basketball league for ASEAN nations
- Australian Baseball League:
  - Australian Baseball League (1989–1999) (defunct)
  - Australian Baseball League
- AL-Bank Ligaen, a former name for Denmark's top men's ice hockey league

== Other uses ==
- ABL, glossing abbreviation for ablative case
- Activity-based learning, a range of pedagogical approaches
- Ambler Airport in Alaska, US (IATA airport code ABL)
- Asset-based lending
- Lampung Nyo language, an Austronesian language of Indonesia, by ISO 639-3 language code

== See also ==
- AB1 (disambiguation)
- ABI (disambiguation)
- Able (disambiguation)
