= Schechner =

Schechner is a German surname. Notable people with the surname include:

- Jacki Schechner, American television journalist
- Nanette Schechner (1804–1860), German operatic soprano
- Richard Schechner, American performing arts professor
- Sara J. Schechner (born 1957), American historian of science

== See also ==
- Tomer Shechner, Israeli psychologist
- Schachner
