= Cholo (disambiguation) =

Cholo is a term referring to Amerindians or Mexican Americans.

Cholo may also refer to:

== Cultures ==
- Cholo (subculture), Chicano and Latino subculture
- Cholo languages, of Colombia and Panama

== People ==
- El Cholo (wrestler) (born 1973), Mexican wrestler
- Cholo Laurel (born 1961), Filipino filmmaker
- Carmelo Simeone (1934–2014), Argentine footballer, called Cholo
- Cholo Violago (born 1984), Filipino politician
- Diego Simeone (born 1970), nicknamed "El Cholo", Argentine football manager and former player
- Cholo Espada (born 1948), Puerto Rican boxer

== Other uses ==
- Cholo, alternate name for Abi (Cholo), a mountain in Nepal
- Cholo, a character from George A. Romero's film Land of the Dead portrayed by John Leguizamo
- Cholo (film), a 1972 Peruvian film
- Cholo (video game)
- El Cholo Spanish Cafe
- Cholo alethe (Pseudalethe choloensis), a subtropical bird
