= Beau Correll =

American attorney and political commentator

- Born: Carroll Correll Jr. July 20, 1982 (age 44); Atlanta, GA
- Occupation: Attorney
- Website: www.correllfirm.com

Carroll "Beau" Correll Jr. (born July 20, 1982) is an American attorney and political commentator. In 2016, Correll was a leader in the effort to deny Donald Trump the Republican nomination through the use of a federal lawsuit, amendments to Convention rules, and floor action at the 2016 Republican National Convention in Cleveland, Ohio.

On April 16, 2016, Correll was elected as a national delegate to represent the 10th Congressional District of Virginia to the convention. At the time of his election, Va. Code § 24.2-545(D) required national delegates to "be bound to vote on the first ballot at the national convention for the candidate receiving the most votes in the primary." Voting in opposition could have resulted in a misdemeanor punishable by up to one year in jail and up to a $2,500 fine. Donald Trump won the Virginia primary, thereby entitling him to all of that state's delegate votes at the national convention under state law.

Approximately 20 states had similar laws to Virginia's that would bind national delegates under state law at the time. Trump, in the lead in national delegate totals, publicly opposed efforts to unbind delegates and called it "illegal" for delegates not to vote for him.

Arguing that Trump's nomination would lead to a Republican loss to Clinton and, if successful, a weak, chaotic presidency and that he would risk jail rather than vote for Trump, Correll sued Virginia's Attorney General Mark Herring in Correll v. Herring, an effort to unbind the delegation under state law. The suit was filed in federal court in the Eastern District of Virginia. Correll was represented by David Rivkin of BakerHostetler.

Correll is also the founder of Free The Delegates, a Super PAC, created to oppose the ascent of Trump to the Republican nomination and paving the way for a new nominee. In addition to Correll v. Herring, Correll and the PAC supported both favorable modifications to RNC rules and actions voted on by delegates at large, rather than members of the Rules Committee. In order to aid in the selection of a different nominee, the organization supported efforts to allow delegates to vote their conscience, secret balloting, and the selection of their own vice-presidential candidate.

On July 11, 2016, the federal court ruled in Correll's favor, striking down the binding statute on First Amendment grounds, thus, unbinding delegates under state law.

Correll's efforts to oppose Trump were chronicled by VICE News as well as the Washington Post.

He has been a commentator for Fox, CNN, MSNBC, CNBC, CBS, NBC, and ABC and resides in Winchester, Virginia. Correll graduated from Virginia Tech with a bachelor's degree in international studies and political science. He earned a J.D. from Widener University Commonwealth Law School in 2007.
