= Abis =

Abis may refer to:

== Places ==
- Abis, Philippines, in Negros Oriental Province
- ‘Abis, in Ma'rib Governorate, Yemen
- Abīs al Mustajaddah, in Beheira Governorate, Egypt

== People ==
- Lucio Abis (1926–2014), Italian politician
- Mark Abis, British musician

== Other uses ==
- Abis Mal, a character in Disney's Aladdin
- Abis interface, between BTS and BSC in GERAN
- Able Seaman Imagery Specialist, in the Australian Navy

== See also ==
- Ad Abis, Chah Salem Rural District, Central District, Omidiyeh County, Khuzestan Province, Iran
- Abi (disambiguation)
