= Henry W. Van Eck =

American judge

Henry W. Van Eck is the chief bankruptcy judge for the United States bankruptcy court, Middle District of Pennsylvania.

== Childhood ==
Judge Van Eck was born in Ann Arbor, Michigan.

== Education ==
Judge Van Eck earned his Bachelor of Science in political science from Susquehanna University in 1995 and is a 1998 cum laude graduate of Widener University Commonwealth Law School.

== Legal work experience ==
After graduating law school he joined the law firm of Cummingham and Chernicoff, P.C. where he began practicing bankruptcy law. Van Eck then cofounded the law firm of Van Eck & Van Eck, P.C. In 2011, he became a shareholder with Mette, Evans & Woodside law firm in Harrisburg, Pennsylvania. In 2016, Van Eck was recommended for a federal bankruptcy judgeship by Judicial Council for the Third Circuit. He was appointed to the United States Bankruptcy Court for the Middle District of Pennsylvania on April 6, 2017. He became chief judge of the United States Bankruptcy Court for the Middle District of Pennsylvania in December 2019. His term will expire on April 5, 2031.

Judge Van Eck is a member of the American, Pennsylvania, and Dauphin County Bar Associations, the American Bankruptcy Institute and the National Conference of Bankruptcy Judges.
