= Abbi =

Abbi may refer to:

== People ==
=== Single name ===
- Abbi (musician) (born Absalom Nyinza), Kenyan Afro-jazz and Afro-fusion musician
- Abbi (Saxon), 8th century Saxon warrior

=== Given name ===
- Abbi Aitken (born 1991), Scottish cricketer
- Abbi Fisher (born 1957), American alpine skier
- Abbi Glines (born 1977), American novelist
- Abbi Grant (born 1995), Scottish footballer
- Abbi Jacobson (born 1984), American comedian, writer, actress and illustrator
- Abbi Tatton, English news reporter

=== Surname ===
- Anvita Abbi (born 1949), Indian linguist
- Rajni Abbi, Indian lawyer and politician

== Places ==
- Abbi, Uzo-Uwani, a village in Uzo-Uwani local government area, Nigeria

== See also ==
- Abbey (disambiguation)
- Abby (disambiguation)
- ABI (disambiguation)
