= Keli M. Neary =

American judge (born 1981)

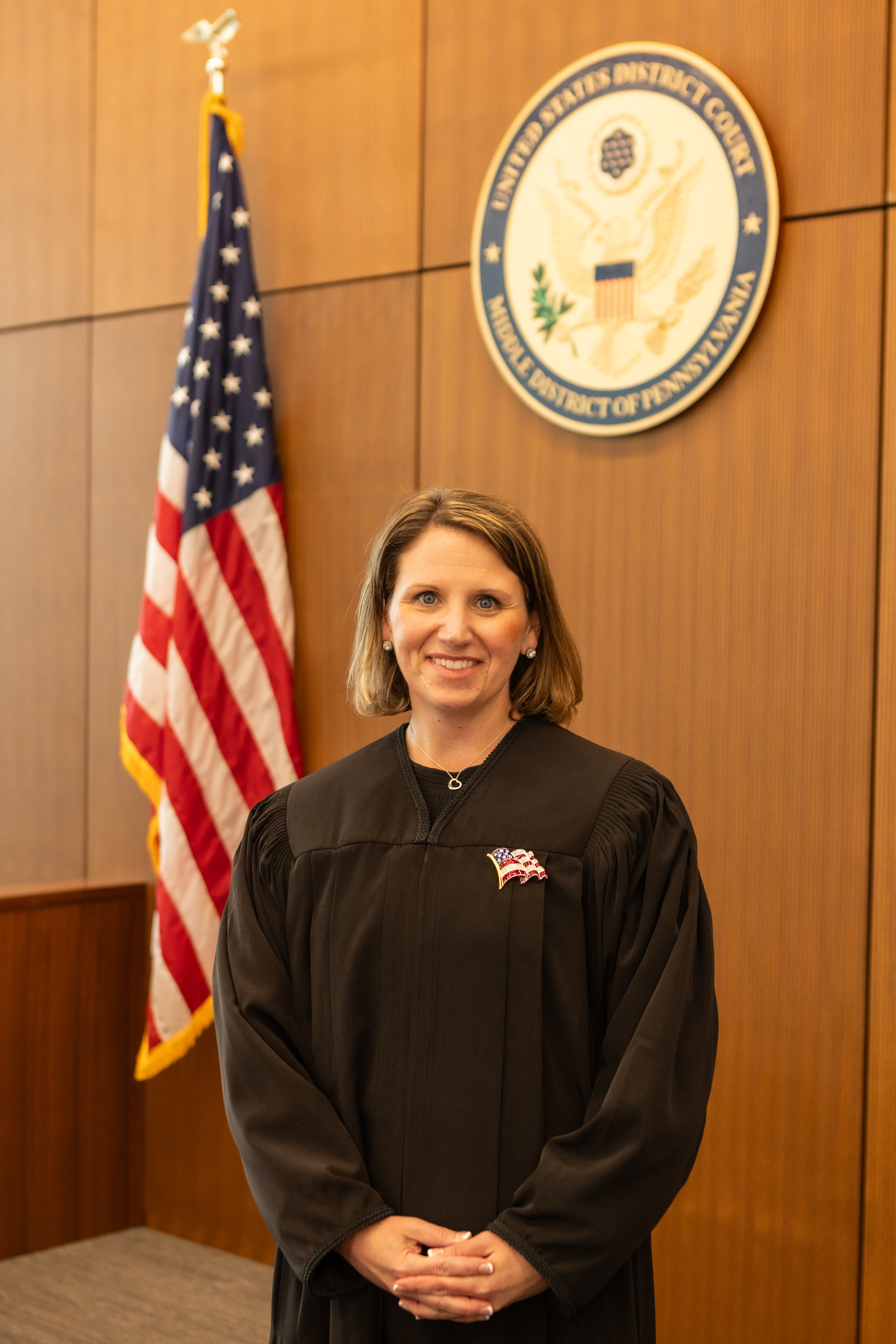

Judge of the United States District Court for the Middle District of Pennsylvania
- Incumbent
- Assumed office January 17, 2025
- Appointed by: Joe Biden
- Preceded by: Christopher C. Conner

Personal details
- Born: Keli Marie Neary; 1981 (age 44–45) Johnstown, Pennsylvania, U.S.
- Education: University of Pittsburgh at Johnstown (BA); Widener University (JD)

Keli Marie Neary (born 1981) is an American lawyer who is serving as a United States district judge of the United States District Court for the Middle District of Pennsylvania.

== Education ==
Neary received a Bachelor of Arts, cum laude, from the University of Pittsburgh at Johnstown in 2003 and a Juris Doctor from Widener University Commonwealth Law School in 2006.

== Career ==
From 2006 to 2007, she served as a law clerk for Judges C. Joseph Rehkamp, Kathy Morrow, and Keith B. Quigley on the Perry County Court of Common Pleas. From 2007 to 2012, she was an assistant counsel in the Pennsylvania State Police's Office of Chief Counsel. From 2012 to 2019, she served as a deputy, senior deputy, and then chief deputy attorney general in the Civil Law Division. From 2019 to 2025, she served as executive deputy attorney general for the Civil Law Division of the Pennsylvania Attorney General's office.

=== Federal judicial service ===
On July 31, 2024, President Joe Biden nominated Neary to serve as a United States district judge of the United States District Court for the Middle District of Pennsylvania. President Biden nominated Neary to the seat vacated by Judge Christopher C. Conner, who subsequently retired on January 17, 2025. On September 25, 2024, a hearing on her nomination was held before the Senate Judiciary Committee. On November 21, 2024, her nomination was reported out of committee by an 11–10 party-line vote. On December 5, 2024, the United States Senate invoked cloture on her nomination by a 48–45 vote. The following day, her nomination was confirmed by a 49–48 vote. She received her judicial commission on January 17, 2025.

Legal offices
Preceded by Christopher C. Conner	Judge of the United States District Court for the Middle District of Pennsylvania; 2025–present	Incumbent
