= Thomas Felsberg =

Brazilian lawyer, jurist, writer and lecturer

Thomas Benes Felsberg (born in São Paulo on July 25, 1943) is a Brazilian lawyer, jurist, writer and lecturer, graduated in Law from University of São Paulo. He has a master's degree from Columbia University.

Acting mostly in the field of insolvency, he is one of the leading lawyers in this area, recognized by publications such as Chambers and Partners, The Legal 500, Leaders League and Latin Lawyers. He took part in the committees that drafted the current Bankruptcy and Corporate Recovery Law in Brazil. Felsberg is a founding partner of the law firm Felsberg Advogados, in São Paulo, Brazil, acting in the areas of Restructuring and Insolvency, Litigation and Arbitration, Privatization, Aviation and Government Relations.

== Biography ==
He is a member of the Order of Attorneys of Brazil ("Ordem dos Advogados do Brasil", Brazilian Bar Association) and a Director of the International Insolvency Institute, besides being President of the advisory board of the Columbia University Club of Brazil and a member of numerous national and international professional associations in the field, such as the American Bankruptcy Institute, INSOL International and the American College of Bankruptcy. He is also a member of the Legal Council of the Federation of Industries of the State of São Paulo (FIESP), the Brazilian Institute of Business Recovery Studies (IBR) and an arbitrator of the Market Chamber (Câmara do Mercado), a forum for the settlement of disputes, based on the Brazilian Arbitration Act and according to its Arbitration Rules."a forum for the solution of issues related to business or corporate law".

In 2022, he was designated as Brazil correspondent for Unidroit (The International Institute for the Unification of Private Law), International Institute for the Unification of Private Law, an independent intergovernmental organization dedicated to studying ways to harmonize and coordinate private law between countries, paving the way for the adoption of uniform legislation of private law.

== The Office ==
Felsberg Advogados is an international reference in the area of bankruptcy and company recovery.

=== German Desk ===
Thomas Felsberg Advogados' German Desk focuses on clients from Germany, Austria and Switzerland, or who have business interests in these countries. The team is made up of ten German-speaking lawyers, two of whom are qualified to work in Germany.

=== China Desk ===
Felsberg's China Desk focuses on customers in China, or with business interests in that country. Relates to traditional Chinese law firms, working under the guidance of Ambassador Sérgio Amaral, President Emeritus of the Brazil-China Business Council.

== Awards ==
For his work in the insolvency and corporate restructuring sector, in Brazil and abroad, Thomas Felsberg won the annual award from the Global Restructuring Review, the GRR Lifetime Achievement Award, in 2019.

In March 2022, Thomas Felsberg received the Lifetime Achievement Award, from the Chambers Brazil Awards 2022.

== Books ==
- FELSBERG, Thomas Benes. Foreign business in Brazil – a practical law guide. Brazilian Institute of Transactional Law. Interinvest. São Paulo, 1976
- FELSBERG, Thomas Benes, FURLAN, Fernando de Magalhães. Brazil-China trade, law and economics. Aduaneiras, São Paulo, 2005
- FELSBERG, Thomas Benes. The challenge of financing companies undergoing judicial recovery. (Applied business law: from business law, Almedina, 2015. São Paulo)

== Others ==
- FELSBERG, Thomas Benes; and BOACNIN, Victoria Villela. Articles 26 to 34 of the LRF (chapter In Commentary on the Corporate Reorganization Law, coordinated by Prof. Dr. Paulo Fernando Campos Salles de Toledo). IBR – Brazilian Institute of Business Recovery Studies.
- FELSBERG, Thomas. Preface in: Judicial recovery – comparative analysis Brazil-United States, coordination of Prof. doctor Paulo Fernando Campos Salles de Toledo. IBR – Brazilian Institute of Business Recovery Studies.
- FELSBERG, Thomas. Afterword to the Brazilian Edition: legal aspects of company recovery in Brazil. In: SLATTER, Stuart; LOVETT, David. How to recover a company: managing the recovery of value and performance. São Paulo: Atlas, 2009.
