= Relationships of the Donald Trump 2016 presidential campaign =

Relationships of an American political campaign

Donald Trump ran a successful campaign for the 2016 U.S. presidential election. He formally announced his campaign on June 16, 2015, at Trump Tower in New York City, initially battling for the Republican Party's nomination. On May 26, 2016, he became the Republican Party's presumptive nominee. Trump was officially nominated on July 19 at the Republican National Convention. He chose Mike Pence, the sitting governor of Indiana, as his vice presidential running mate. On November 8, Trump and Pence were elected president and vice president of the United States.

Trump's populist positions in opposition to illegal immigration and various trade agreements, such as the Trans-Pacific Partnership, earned him support especially among voters who were male, white, blue-collar, working class, and those without college degrees. Many voters in the Rust Belt, who gave Trump the electoral votes needed to win the presidency, switched from supporting Bernie Sanders to Trump after Hillary Clinton won the Democratic nomination.

Many of Trump's remarks were controversial and helped his campaign garner extensive coverage by the mainstream media, trending topics, and social media. Trump's campaign rallies attracted large crowds as well as public controversy. Some of the events were marked by incidents of violence between Trump supporters and protesters, mistreatment of journalists, and disruption by a large group of protesters who effectively shut down a major rally in Chicago. Trump himself was accused of inciting violence at his rallies.

Trump's disdain for political correctness was a staple theme of his campaign and proved popular among his supporters. Many, including some mainstream commentators and some prominent Republicans, viewed him as appealing to racism, a charge that Trump repeatedly denied. Trump's most polarizing and widely reported proposals were about issues of immigration and border security, especially his proposed deportation of all illegal immigrants, the proposed construction of a substantial wall on the Mexico–United States border at Mexico's expense, his false characterizations of many illegal Mexican immigrants as "criminals, drug dealers, rapists, etc.", and a temporary ban on foreign Muslims entering the U.S. After considerable backlash, he later modified the "Trump travel ban" to apply to people originating from countries which he described as having a history of terrorism against the United States or its allies. This was also criticized for excluding countries which the U.S. has significant financial ties with, such as Saudi Arabia.

Opposition to Trump grew during his campaign among both Republicans (who viewed Trump as irrevocably damaging to the party and its chances of winning elections during and after 2016, leading to the coalescence of the Never Trump movement) and Democrats (who decried Trump's anti-immigrant and anti-Muslim policies, his behavior toward critics, his treatment of the media, and his support from the ethno-nationalist alt-right). Although some prominent Republican leaders declined to endorse Trump after he won the Republican nomination, many Republican congress-members showed support for Trump and his policy positions despite major personal or political conflicts with him. Some such supporters of Trump's campaign were accused, by both conservatives and liberals, of prioritizing party loyalty and avoiding alienation of Trump supporters to ensure re-election, thereby refraining from condemning Trump's actions.

On January 6, 2017, the United States government's intelligence agencies concluded that the Russian government interfered in the United States elections against the campaign of Clinton and in support of Trump, triggering subsequent investigation. As president, Trump repeatedly rejected the conclusions of the U.S. intelligence agencies.

== Black communities ==
It appeared Trump was receiving little support from African Americans: in a poll in August 2016, only 5% of black voters said they intended to vote for him. Trump ended up receiving 8% of the African-American vote (about half a million more than Mitt Romney in 2012). Starting in July and August, in an effort to improve his appeal to black Americans, Trump was vocal in expressing concern for their situations. Speaking in Virginia in August, 2016, Trump said, "You're living in your poverty, your schools are no good, you have no jobs, 58 percent of your youth is unemployed—what the hell do you have to lose by trying something new, like Trump?....Look. It is a disaster the way African-Americans are living ... We'll get rid of the crime ... You'll be able to walk down the street without getting shot." He accused Clinton of racism and bigotry.

On September 3, Trump visited a black congregation in Detroit, Michigan, accompanied by former Republican presidential candidate Dr. Ben Carson. Trump was interviewed afterward by Bishop Wayne T. Jackson for the church's cable channel. On September 15, as Trump was addressing an assembly at Bethel United Methodist Church in Flint, Michigan, the pastor, Faith Green Timmons, interrupted him as he criticized Clinton, asking him not to "give a political speech". Trump complied.

== Business community ==
No Fortune 100 CEO donated to Trump's presidential campaign. Eleven donated to Trump's rival Clinton, and 89 contributed to neither. This represented a shift from 2012 when Republican nominee Mitt Romney received major support from American business executives.

In May 2016, the president of the U.S. Chamber of Commerce commented that the business community was cautious about Trump and Clinton. Members of the community who endorsed Trump include investors T. Boone Pickens, Carl Icahn and Wilbur Ross, Home Depot co-founder Ken Langone, and entrepreneur and PayPal co-founder Peter Thiel. As of January 2016, small and mid-size business owners and officers were second to retirees as the most common donors to Trump's campaign. Reasons cited for their support of Trump included opposition to Obamacare, immigration and feeling "fed up with politicians". In a survey conducted in late January 2016, 38 percent of small business owners indicated that they believed Trump would be the best president for small business, while 21 percent selected Hillary Clinton.

Other members of the business community were critical. In June 2016, the Clinton campaign released a list of endorsements from 50 current and former business leaders, including longtime Republicans. The group included longtime Democrats and Clinton supporters, like Warren Buffett and Marc Benioff, as well as independents or Republicans who had switched sides, like Daniel Akerson and Hamid R. Moghadam.

== Conservative movement ==
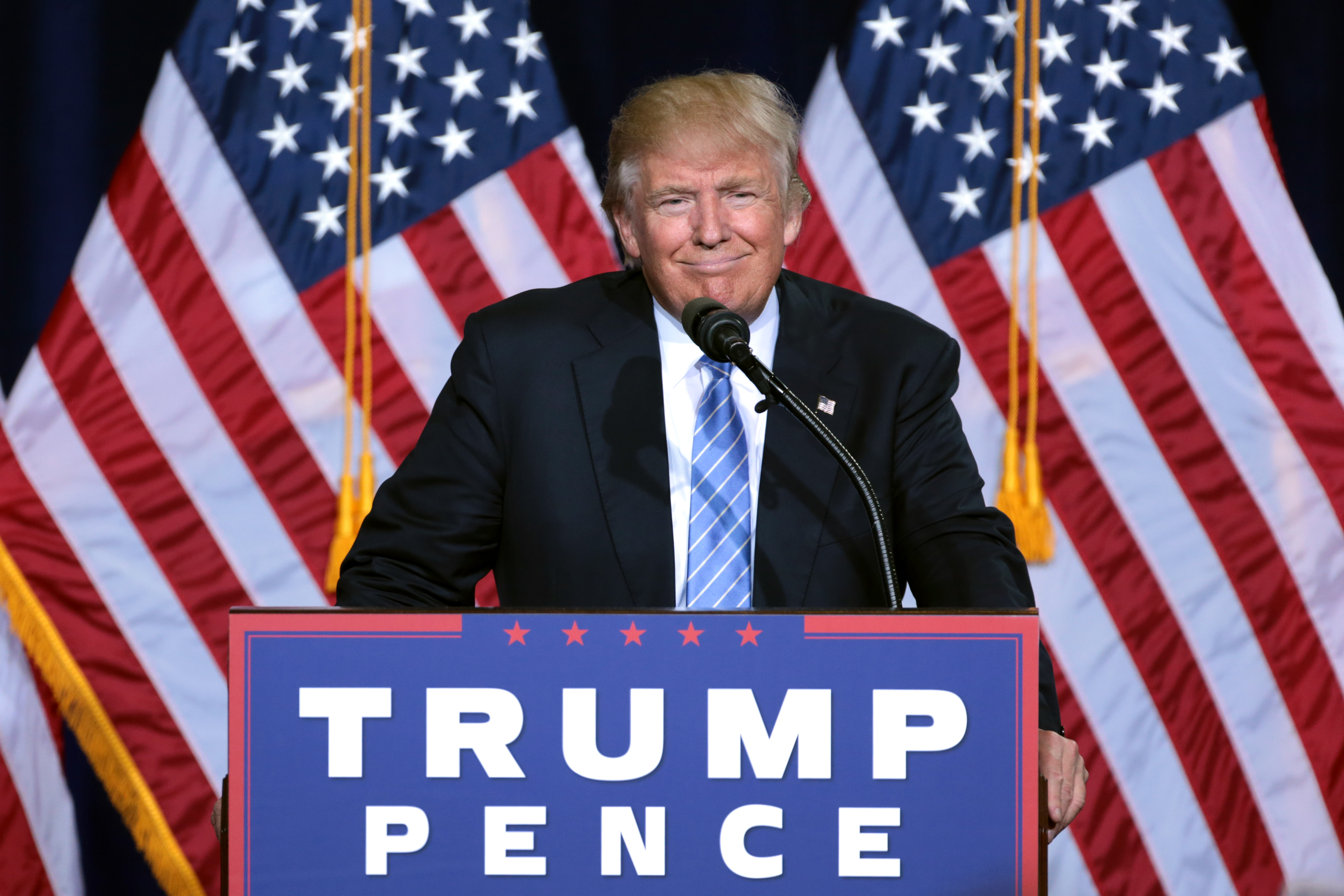
Trump delivering a speech in August 2016

Trump's right-wing populist positions—nativist, protectionist, and semi-isolationist—differ in many ways from traditional conservatism. He opposes many free trade deals and military interventionist policies that conservatives generally support, and opposes cuts in Medicare and Social Security benefits. While insisting that Washington is "broken" and can only be fixed by an outsider, Washington-based conservatives were surprised by the popular support for his positions.

Trump polled well with Tea Party voters, and politicians with tea party ties, such as Sarah Palin, similarly endorsed Trump.

Some prominent conservatives praised Trump. Newt Gingrich described him as the latest incarnation of the Reagan Revolution, and said his election would be "very healthy for America". In the aftermath of Trump's statements regarding the Khan's, Gingrich said Trump was making himself a less acceptable candidate for the presidency than Clinton, but that "Trump is vastly better than Hillary as President". Rush Limbaugh, while clearly favoring Ted Cruz, relished the degree to which Trump exposed the conservative establishment as an elitist self-interested clique. Sean Hannity was an unapologetic advocate for Trump and endorsed him.

In July and August 2015, U.S. Senator John McCain and Trump criticized each other, primarily over immigration. At a July 18, 2015, event Trump described McCain as a "loser" and added, "He's not a war hero. He was a war hero because he was captured. I like people who weren't captured." His comments were criticized; some of his primary rivals said he should withdraw from the race. Trump later denied having said McCain is not a war hero, saying "If somebody's a prisoner, I consider them a war hero." He criticized McCain for not having done enough for veterans. In 2014, McCain worked with senator Bernie Sanders to create the Veterans Choice program, which Trump later falsely claimed more than 150 times he had created. McCain said Trump should apologize, not to him personally, but to former American prisoners of war and "the families of those who have sacrificed in conflict". Trump declined to issue any apology.

Eventually, McCain endorsed Trump because he was the nominee of the Republican party. On August 2, Trump stated he was not endorsing McCain for the Republican nomination for his Senate seat. Three days later, however, he did endorse him, saying in prepared remarks, "I hold in the highest esteem Sen. John McCain for his service to our country in uniform and in public office and I fully support and endorse his reelection." McCain later withdrew his endorsement following the Access Hollywood controversy in October 2016.

Republican Senator Lindsey Graham, a primary rival, was "one of Trump's fiercest critics". He called Trump a "race-baiting, xenophobic, religious bigot" and asserted that Trump doesn't have the temperament or judgment to be president. After Trump attacked a federal judge for his Mexican heritage, Graham urged people who had endorsed Trump to rescind their endorsements, saying "This is the most un-American thing from a politician since Joe McCarthy."

The Jeb Bush–Trump dynamic was one of the more contentious relationships among Republicans. Bush's campaign spent tens of millions of dollars on anti-Trump ads, while Trump mocked Bush as "low energy". During an exchange with Bush in the ninth Republican primary debate, the audience (most favoring Bush) repeatedly booed Trump. Trump scoffed that the audience was made up of "Jeb's special interests and lobbyists". According to The Washington Post, the most telling aspect of the Bush–Trump duel may have been that, "No candidate in the race was prepared for GOP voters' opposition to immigration, with the exception of Trump", and the anti-illegal immigration sentiment that Trump tapped into, including with the Act of Love advert.

Senator Ted Cruz of Texas was a rival for the Republican nomination. In the early days of the primary Cruz showered praise on Trump. But as the primary season went on, Cruz called Trump a "bully" and a "pathological liar", and Trump took to referring to Cruz as "Lyin' Ted". Trump claimed Cruz was not eligible to be president because he was born in Canada. In his speech to the Republican National Convention, Cruz did not endorse Trump. However, on September 23, 2016, Cruz publicly endorsed Trump for president, citing the fact that Trump was the nominee of the Republican Party as reason for his support.

=== Stop Trump movement ===
A concerted effort by some Republicans and other prominent conservatives to prevent Trump from obtaining the Republican Party presidential nomination gained momentum following Trump's wins in the Super Tuesday primaries on March 15, 2016.

On March 17, 2016, several dozen conservatives met at the Army and Navy Club of Washington DC to discuss preventing Trump from securing the nomination. Among the strategies discussed were a "unity ticket", a possible third-party candidate and a contested convention, especially if Trump did not gain the 1,237 delegates necessary.

In June 2016, activists Eric O'Keefe and Dane Waters formed a group called Delegates Unbound, attempting to convince delegates to vote for whomever they want. By June 19, hundreds of delegates to the Republican National Convention calling themselves Free the Delegates had begun raising funds and recruiting members in support of an effort to change Party convention rules to free delegates to vote however they want—instead of according to the results of state caucuses and primaries. However, the convention's Rules Committee voted down, by a vote of 84–21, a move to send a "minority report" to the floor allowing the unbinding of delegates, thereby defeating the "Stop Trump" activists and guaranteeing Trump's nomination. The committee then endorsed the opposite option, voting 87–12 to include rules language specifically stating that delegates were required to vote based on their states' primary and caucus results.

Other conservative commentators were strongly opposed to him. National Review released a January 2016 special issue called "Against Trump", in opposition to Trump's bid for the presidency. William Kristol, publisher of The Weekly Standard, was highly critical of Trump and carried on a public search for an independent candidate to run against Trump and Clinton in the general election, citing a "patriotic obligation to try and offer the American people a third way".

=== Mitt Romney ===
On February 24, 2016, Romney called on Trump to release his tax returns, suggesting they contain a "bombshell". On March 3, Romney expanded his criticism in a widely reported speech in which he said Trump's economic plans would cause profound recession, criticized his foreign policy proposals as reckless and dangerous, and called him a "con man", a "fake", and a "phony", joking that Trump's promises are "as worthless as a degree from Trump University". In June he expressed concern that some of the things Trump says could legitimize racism, and that Trump as president could cause "trickle-down racism, trickle-down bigotry, trickle-down misogyny, all these things (that) are extraordinarily dangerous to the heart and character of America".

Unlike many other Republican critics who came around after Trump was confirmed as the presumptive nominee, Romney continued his "increasingly lonely" challenge to Trump. He explained, "I wanted my grandkids to see that I simply couldn't ignore what Mr. Trump was saying and doing, which revealed a character and temperament unfit for the leader of the free world." He hinted he might vote for Libertarian candidate Gary Johnson. In contrast, while Romney was running for president in 2012, he praised Trump and sought his endorsement.

After Trump won the election, Romney congratulated him by phone and on Twitter. In November he met Trump to discuss the position of Secretary of State.

=== Paul Ryan ===
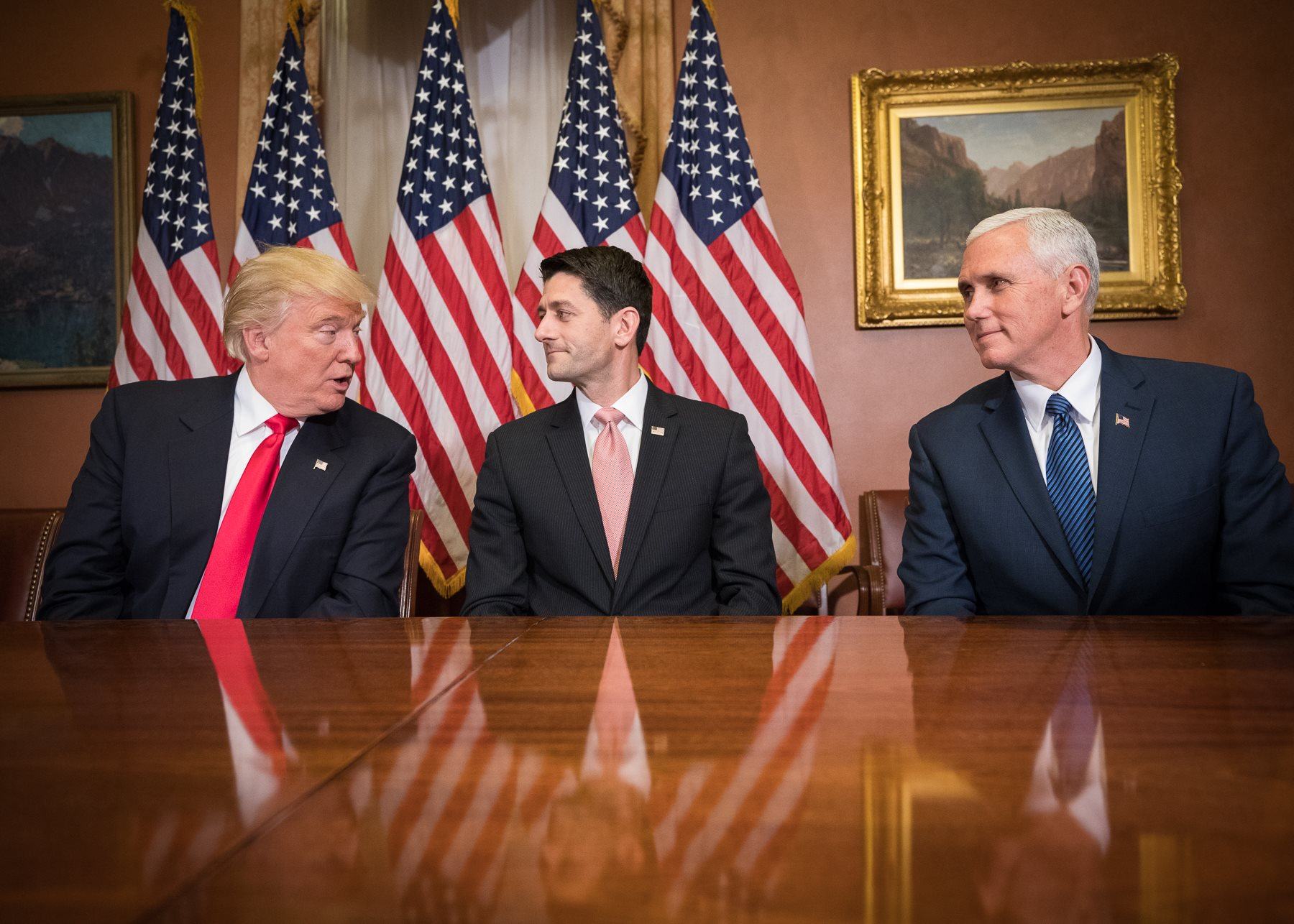
Speaker Paul Ryan meets with Donald Trump and Mike Pence on Capitol Hill after their election victory

Paul Ryan, Speaker of the United States House of Representatives, was initially critical of Trump. In December 2015 when Trump called for a ban on foreign Muslims entering the country, Ryan said "What was proposed yesterday is not what this party stands for, and more importantly, it's not what this country stands for." Even after endorsing Trump, Ryan continued to criticize Trump's religion-based immigration proposals. In early March 2016 Ryan condemned Trump's failure to repudiate the support of white supremacists, and in mid March he strongly objected to Trump's suggestion that there could be "riots" at the Republican convention if he is not the nominee. In June when Trump said the judge hearing a lawsuit against him was biased because he was of Mexican extraction, Ryan said Trump's remarks were "absolutely unacceptable" and "the textbook definition of a racist comment".

In May when Trump was declared the presumptive nominee, Ryan told CNN that he was not ready to endorse Trump, saying "I'm not there right now." He questioned Trump's commitment to conservative values but added he hoped to back him eventually. Trump and Ryan met once during May, and on June 2 Ryan published an op-ed endorsing Trump and stressing the need to prevent Hillary Clinton's election. Ryan later explained that as Majority Leader he feels obligated to support the Republican nominee in the interest of party unity.

On August 2, 2016, one week before Ryan faced a primary for re-election to his house seat, Trump declined to endorse him, saying "I'm just not quite there yet." He praised Ryan's primary opponent. Trump's comments infuriated Republican officials, particularly GOP chairman Reince Priebus. Three days later Trump endorsed Ryan, reading from a prepared statement, "So in our shared mission, to make America great again, I support and endorse our speaker of the House, Paul Ryan."

In October 2016, following the Donald Trump Access Hollywood controversy, Ryan disinvited Trump from a scheduled campaign rally, announced that he would no longer defend or support Trump's presidential campaign, and in a highly unusual move he freed down-ticket congressional members to use their own judgment, saying "you all need to do what's best for you and your district." In the final weeks of the campaign, Trump went on the attack against Ryan, accusing him and other "disloyal" Republicans of deliberately undermining his candidacy as part of "a whole sinister deal". Despite his reluctance to publicly support Trump, Ryan ultimately announced that he cast his vote for Trump a week before election day. In March 2017, Breitbart News released a tape recording with Ryan telling fellow Republican congressmen that he was "not going to defend Donald Trump—not now, not in the future."

== Economists ==
On November 1, 2016, The Wall Street Journal published an open letter signed by 370 economists, including eight Nobel laureates, who stated that Trump would be a "dangerous, destructive" choice and encouraged voters to vote for another candidate. The letter stated that Trump "misinforms the electorate, degrades trust in public institutions with conspiracy theories, and promotes willful delusion over engagement with reality"; that "If elected, he poses a unique danger (...) to the prosperity of the country"; and that he "promotes magical thinking and conspiracy theories over sober assessments of feasible economic policy options".

Peter Navarro of the University of California, Irvine, one of Trump's senior economic advisers, called the letter "an embarrassment to the corporate offshoring wing of the economist profession who continues to insist bad trade deals are good for America." He pointed to a letter signed in September by other economists, 305 in total, including a Nobel laureate, which stated "Clinton's economic agenda is wrong for America." Navarro's endorsement of the Trump economic platform was met with criticism by economists.

== Fox News and Megyn Kelly ==
Trump was one of ten candidates in a Fox News debate on August 6, 2015. Chris Wallace asked him about Mexican illegal immigrants, and Megyn Kelly asked about how he would respond to the Clinton campaign saying that he was waging a "war on women". Trump replied, "I think the big problem this country has is being politically correct." In a later interview with Don Lemon on CNN Tonight, Trump said that Kelly is a "lightweight" and had "blood coming out of her eyes, blood coming out of her ... wherever." Trump tweeted that his remark referred to Kelly's nose but was interpreted by critics as a reference to menstruation. Trump retained his first place standing after the debate, with a Reuters/Ipsos poll at 24 percent.

Following the Kelly incident, Roger Stone, Trump's veteran political adviser, left the campaign, citing "controversies involving personalities and provocative media fights". Despite this, Stone remained a Trump confidant and said to National Review that he is "the ultimate Trump loyalist". In March 2016, Trump resumed his feud with Kelly in Twitter messages disparaging Kelly and calling for a boycott of her show. Fox News responded with a statement saying that Trump's behavior was an "extreme, sick obsession" beneath the dignity of a presidential nominee. In April 2016, Kelly met with Trump at Trump Tower at her request to "clear the air". Following the meeting, Trump stated that Kelly was "very, very nice" and regarding the meeting: "Maybe it was time ... By the way, in all fairness, I give her a lot of credit" for requesting it.

== Hispanic and Latino Americans ==
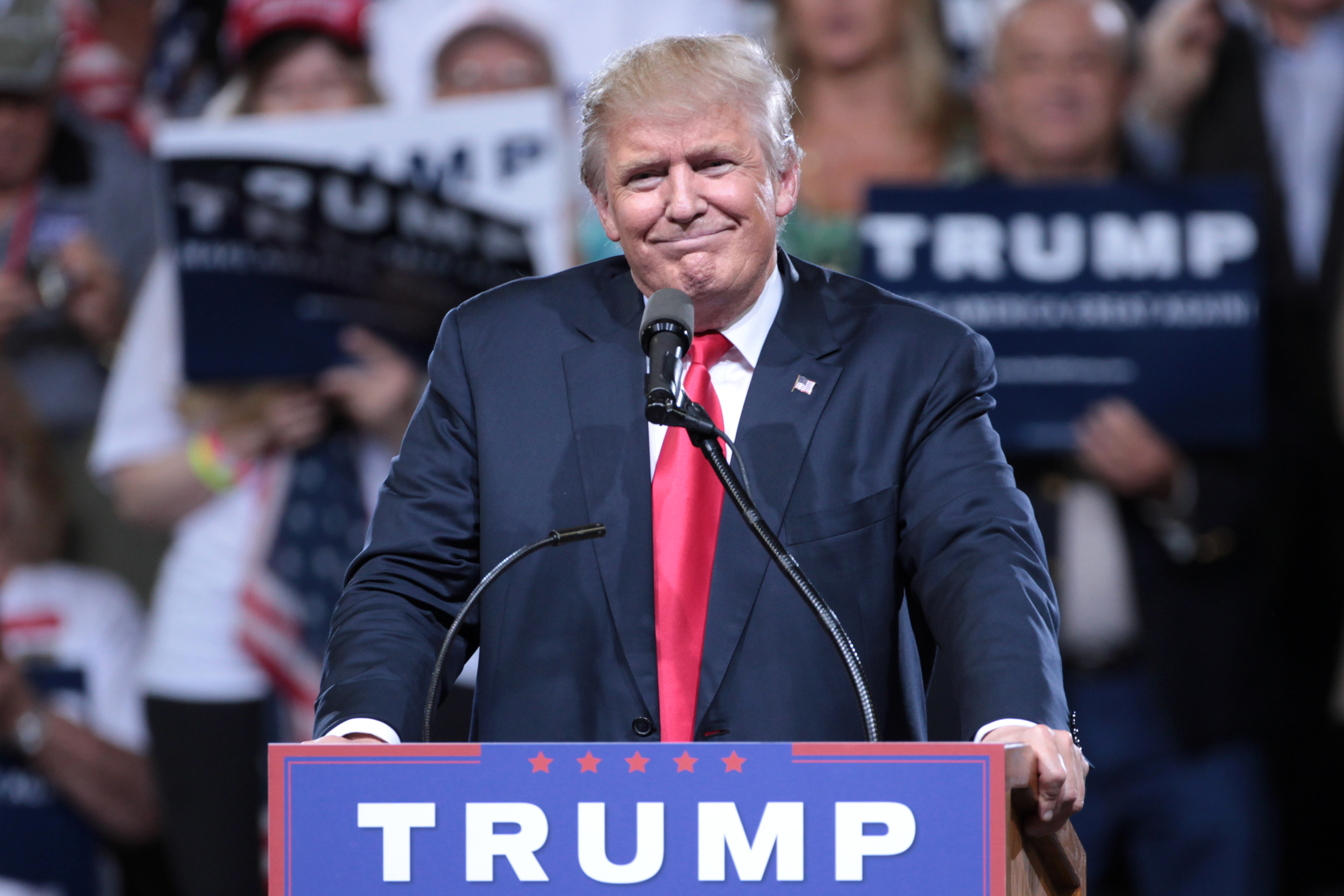
Donald Trump speaking at a rally in Phoenix, Arizona

Trump's popularity among Hispanic and Latino Americans was low; a survey conducted in February 2016 showed 80 percent of Hispanic voters had an unfavorable view of Trump, more than double the percentage of any other candidate. These low rankings were attributed to Trump's anti-immigrant rhetoric.

Alarm at Trump's rise prompted an increase in eligible Latino immigrants who to naturalize to vote against him. Despite his poor national standing with Hispanic and Latino Americans, he garnered higher numbers than Republican rivals, along with other minority groups. Trump received pockets of Hispanic support, winning around 45% of the Hispanic vote in the Nevada Republican caucuses, and receiving support among Cuban Americans in Florida. Despite expectations of low Latino support, Trump received about 29% of the Hispanic vote, more than Romney in 2012.

In August 2016, Trump created and met with a Hispanic advisory council. He hinted publicly he might soften his call for the deportation of all undocumented immigrants. On August 31, 2016, he visited Mexico and met with President Enrique Peña Nieto, saying he wanted to build relations. However, in a speech later that night, Trump laid out a 10-step plan reaffirming his hardline positions, and used harsh rhetoric to portray many illegal immigrants as a danger to Americans. In reaction, one member of Trump's Hispanic advisory council resigned, and other Hispanic supporters said they were reconsidering their support.

== Military ==
According to the Atlantic, "[a]mong prominent ex-military and national-security leaders, the edge clearly belongs to Clinton." Trump's most prominent ex-military supporter was retired Lieutenant General Michael T. Flynn. An open letter endorsing Trump, signed by 88 retired generals and admirals, was released in September 2016. 500 retired military officers endorsed Republican nominee Mitt Romney in 2012.

Trump led in polling of military veterans and military households in September 2016, although his performance with this group trailed "well behind that of other recent Republican candidates".

== Religious community ==
Trump is a Presbyterian and says he attends Marble Collegiate Church, although the church said in a statement that he is "not an active member". In campaign speeches, he had routinely praised the Bible and sometimes carried it, often saying that his own book Trump: The Art of the Deal is his "second-favorite book after the Bible". On occasion, Trump "reflected a degree of indifference" to religion, causing unease among some social conservatives.

Trump solicited the support of religious leaders, inviting dozens of Christian and Jewish leaders to his New York City offices for a meeting and laying on of hands prayer gathering in September 2015. Trump praised prominent national evangelical leaders of the Christian right, including Tony Perkins and Ralph Reed, and received a blessing and endorsement from Greek Orthodox priest and hedge fund manager Emmanuel Lemelson.

Other figures made more direct religious-based critiques of Trump, including from the American Christian right. Russell D. Moore, the head of the Southern Baptist Convention's public-policy arm, the Ethics and Religious Liberty Commission, is a prominent Trump critic and argued that Christians should vote for a conservative third party. Peter Wehner of the Ethics and Public Policy Center said that Trump "embodies a Nietzschean morality rather than a Christian one", writing that Trump is "characterized by indifference to objective truth (there are no facts, only interpretations), the repudiation of Christian concern for the poor and the weak, and disdain for the powerless". On the Christian left, a number of commentators, including Shaun King, criticized Trump's racially charged rhetoric as inconsistent with Christianity.

Trump struggled with Mormon voters, affecting his party's grip on Utah, where Mormons constitute a majority, and Nevada, where they are a significant minority. Reasons for this include Trump's rhetoric concerning Muslims, which Mormons see as a parallel to their own historic persecution. Following the release of the 2016 Access Hollywood tape, several high-profile Mormon political leaders from Utah, including Utah governor Gary Herbert and representative Jason Chaffetz, withdrew their endorsements for Trump. The Deseret News, a media outlet owned by the Church of Jesus Christ of Latter-day Saints, broke with an 80-year tradition of refraining from presidential endorsements to publish an editorial calling on Trump to step aside.

The phrase "One people under one God" was noted as having been used repeatedly in Trump speeches, especially to religious groups. Christian Today termed the use of the phrase "a rare mention of religion by the Republican presidential nominee" in early September. At about the same time, Reuters also said Trump "rarely mentions religion" and used the phrase as an illustration that Trump's campaign, previously centered around confrontational issues, had begun to invoke religion to appeal to voters and build a unified base.

== Tea Party movement ==
Trump praised the U.S. Tea Party movement throughout his 2016 campaign. In August 2015, he told a Tea Party gathering in Nashville that "The tea party people are incredible people. These are people who work hard and love the country and they get beat up all the time by the media." In a January 2016 CNN poll at the beginning of the 2016 Republican primary, Trump led all Republican candidates modestly among self-identified Tea Party voters with 37 percent supporting Trump and 34 percent supporting Ted Cruz.

== Trump family ==
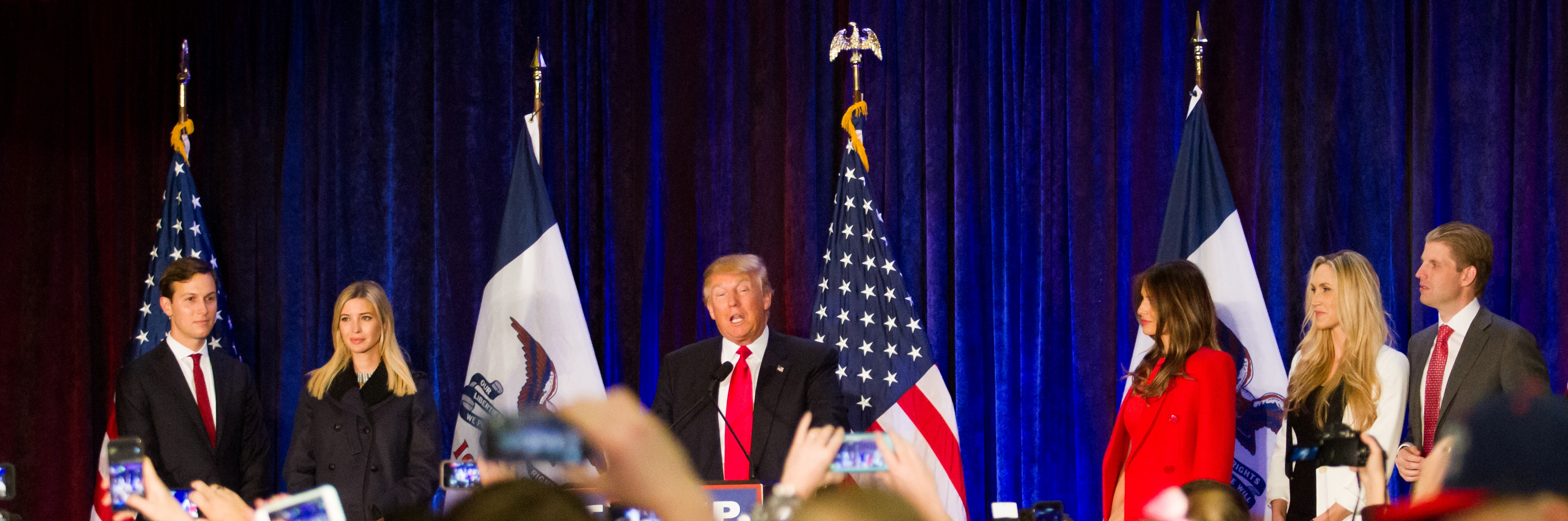
Trump, his wife Melania, Ivanka Trump, Jared Kushner and Eric Trump, February 1, 2016

Trump called his wife Melania "my pollster" and had said that she supported his presidential run. Melania appeared at her husband's June 2015 campaign announcement and at the Fox News debate in Cleveland. She has also conducted several televised interviews and appeared at a Trump rally in South Carolina along with other family members. Trump's adult children Donald Jr, Ivanka, and Eric, as well as Ivanka's husband Jared Kushner, were all involved in his campaign and are regarded as key advisers. They were reportedly influential in persuading Trump to fire his controversial campaign manager Corey Lewandowski in June 2016. Melania, Donald Jr, Eric, and Ivanka were "Headliner" speakers at the Republican National Convention. If elected president, Trump said that he would hand over control of his company to his children instead of placing it in a blind trust.

== Wikileaks ==
Trump praised Wikileaks in October 2016, saying, "I love Wikileaks."

During the 2016 U.S. presidential election campaign, WikiLeaks released emails and other documents from the Democratic National Committee and from Hillary Clinton's campaign manager, John Podesta, showing that the party's national committee favoured Clinton over her rival Bernie Sanders in the primaries, leading to the resignation of DNC chairwoman Debbie Wasserman Schultz and an apology to Sanders from the DNC. These releases caused significant harm to the Clinton campaign, and have been cited as a potential contributing factor to her loss in the general election against Donald Trump. The U.S. intelligence community expressed "high confidence" that the leaked emails had been hacked by Russia and supplied to WikiLeaks. WikiLeaks said that the source of the documents was not Russia or any other state.

Also during the 2016 U.S. presidential election campaign, Assange only exposed material damaging to the Democratic National Committee and Democratic presidential candidate Hillary Clinton. Wikileaks popularized conspiracies about the Democratic Party and Hillary Clinton, such as tweeting an article which suggested Clinton campaign chairperson John Podesta engaged in satanic rituals, which was later revealed to be false implying that the Democratic Party had Seth Rich killed, suggesting that Clinton wore earpieces to debates and interviews, claiming that Hillary Clinton wanted to drone strike Assange, promoting conspiracy theories about Clinton's health, and promoting a conspiracy theory from a Donald Trump-related internet community tying the Clinton campaign to child kidnapper Laura Silsby. According to Harvard political scientist Matthew Baum and College of the Canyons political scientist Phil Gussin, Wikileaks strategically released e-mails related to the Clinton campaign whenever Clinton's lead expanded in the polls.

== Women ==
There was a large gender gap in support for Trump, with women significantly less likely to express support than men. A March 2016 poll showed that half of U.S. women had a "very unfavorable" view of Trump. A separate March 2016 poll showed women favoring Hillary Clinton 55 percent to 35 percent over Trump, "twice the gender gap of the 2012 presidential election", while a Gallup poll showed a 70 percent unfavorable rating. A May 2016 NPR article, citing a poll that showed Clinton leading Trump among women by 17 percentage points while Trump led among men by five points—a 22-point gender gap—suggested that "the Trump–Clinton gender gap could be the largest in more than 60 years". By mid-October 2016 an average among 12 polls showed Trump trailing by 15 percentage points among women but ahead by five points among men. Both before and during his presidential campaign, Trump made a number of comments about women that some viewed as sexist, or misogynistic. Trump won among white women overall, winning nearly twice as many non-college educated white women than Clinton, although Clinton outperformed Trump with votes from college-educated white women.

== White nationalists and white supremacists ==
From the outset of his campaign, Trump was endorsed by various white nationalist and white supremacist movements and leaders. On February 24, 2016, David Duke, a former Ku Klux Klan Grand Dragon, expressed vocal support for Trump's campaign on his radio show. Shortly thereafter in an interview with Jake Tapper, Trump repeatedly claimed to be ignorant of Duke and his support. Republican presidential rivals were quick to respond on his wavering, and Senator Marco Rubio stated the Duke endorsement made Trump un-electable. Others questioned his professed ignorance of Duke by pointing out that in 2000, Trump called him a "Klansman". Trump later blamed the incident on a poor earpiece he was given by CNN. Later the same day Trump stated that he had previously disavowed Duke in a tweet posted with a video on his Twitter account. On March 3, 2016, Trump stated: "David Duke is a bad person, who I disavowed on numerous occasions over the years. I disavowed him. I disavowed the KKK."

On July 22, 2016 (the day after Trump's nomination), Duke announced that he will be a candidate for the Republican nomination for the U.S. Senate from Louisiana. He commented, "I'm overjoyed to see Donald Trump and most Americans embrace most of the issues that I've championed for years." A spokesperson for the Trump campaign said Trump "has disavowed David Duke and will continue to do so."

On August 25, 2016, Clinton gave a speech saying that Trump is "taking hate groups mainstream and helping a radical fringe take over the Republican Party." She identified this radical fringe with the "Alt-right", a largely online variation of American far-right that embraces white nationalism and is anti-immigration. During the election season, the Alt-right movement "evangelized" online in support of racist and antisemitic ideologies. Clinton noted that Trump's campaign chief executive Stephen Bannon described his Breitbart News Network as "the platform for the alt-right." On September 9, 2016, several leaders of the alt-right community held a press conference, described by one reporter as the "coming-out party" of the little-known movement, to explain their goals. Speakers called for a "White Homeland" and expounded on racial differences in intelligence. They also confirmed their support of Trump, saying "This is what a leader looks like."

Richard Spencer, who runs the white nationalist National Policy Institute, said, "Before Trump, our identity ideas, national ideas, they had no place to go". The editor of the Neo-Nazi website The Daily Stormer stated, "Virtually every alt-right Nazi I know is volunteering for the Trump campaign." Rocky Suhayda, chairman of the American Nazi Party said that although Trump "isn't one of us," his election would be a "real opportunity" for the white nationalist movement.

The Southern Poverty Law Center monitored Trump's campaign throughout the election and noted several instances where Trump and lower-level surrogates either used white nationalist rhetoric or engaged with figures in the white nationalist movement.

According to 2021 study in Public Opinion Quarterly, Trump's candidacy simultaneously attracted whites with extreme views on race and made his white supporters more likely to express more extreme views on race.

== r/The_Donald subreddit ==
At over half a million subscribers, the subreddit r/The_Donald on Reddit faced controversy since its inception. Trump hosted an "Ask Me Anything" (AMA) on the subreddit during the 2016 Democratic National Convention on July 27, 2016, and answered thirteen of the thousands of questions posted on the subreddit. Moderators of the subreddit claimed they banned more than 2,000 accounts during Trump's AMA session.

The subreddit was criticized by Vice, which stated in an article that the subreddit was "authoritarian," "racist," "misogynistic," "homophobic," "Islamophobic," and a "hypocritical 'free speech' rallying point." The publication Slate described The_Donald as a "hate speech forum". According to The New York Times, "members respond to accusations of bigotry with defiant claims of persecution at the hands of critics. It is an article of faith among posters that anti-racists are the real bigots, feminists are the actual sexists, and progressive politics are, in effect, regressive."
