= Abbi Tatton =

- Born: 1975 (age 50–51); England
- Education: University of Leeds; American University (MA)
- Occupation: TV reporter
- Employer: CNN

Abbi Tatton was an Internet reporter for CNN. She was born in 1975 and attended the Cherwell School in Oxford, England. She graduated from the University of Leeds in History in 1998.

Based in Washington, D.C., Tatton utilized innovative technologies to present the latest political, national and international news for CNN's afternoon program, The Situation Room, hosting the segment "The Situation Online".

Along with fellow CNN reporter Jacki Schechner, Tatton was one of the first "Internet reporters" in mainstream television news.

Tatton left CNN in January 2010 to join Google/YouTube as a manager of Global Communications.
