= Widener University Commonwealth Law School =

Private law school in Harrisburg, Pennsylvania, US

Coordinates: 40°19′27.0″N 76°51′16.9″W

- Parent school: Widener University
- Established: 1989; 37 years ago
- School type: Private law school
- Parent endowment: $91,000,000
- Dean: andré douglas pond cummings
- Location: Harrisburg, Pennsylvania, United States
- Enrollment: 316
- Faculty: 15
- USNWR ranking: 159th (2024)
- Bar pass rate: 53.75% (2023 first-time takers)
- Website: commonwealthlaw.widener.edu

Widener University Commonwealth Law School (Widener Law Commonwealth) is a law school located in Harrisburg, Pennsylvania, and part of Widener University, a private university in Chester, Pennsylvania. It is one of two separate ABA-accredited law schools of the university. It was founded in 1989 as an expansion of Widener University's law school in Wilmington. It awards the Juris Doctor degree in its full-time and part-time programs and is a member of the Association of American Law Schools (AALS).

== History ==
The Widener University School of Law in Harrisburg was founded in 1989, as an expansion of Widener University's existing law school in Wilmington, Delaware. Anthony J. Santoro, who served as Dean of law from 1983 to 1992, felt that there was a need for legal education in Harrisburg, the capital city of the Commonwealth of Pennsylvania. The law school became one of two law school campuses operated by Widener University.

On July 1, 2015, the two campuses separated into two distinct law schools that operate independently of each other, but remain part of the Widener University. Each law school has its own dean, faculty, students, curriculum, and accreditation. The first Dean of the renamed Widener University Commonwealth Law School in Harrisburg was Christian A. Johnson. The law school chose the name Commonwealth to reflect its mission and ties to the Pennsylvania government and in recognition of Pennsylvania as one of four commonwealths in the nation.

== Campus ==
Located in Pennsylvania's capital of Harrisburg, the campus spans 19 acres and includes 4 academic and administrative buildings as well as recreation and parking areas. The law library houses significant regional legal collections.

== Academics ==
The school offers the Juris Doctor as well as certificate programs. It also offers two dual degree programs, a JD/Online Master of Business Administration with the Widener University School of Business Administration and a JD/Master of Library Science with Clarion University of Pennsylvania.

=== Admissions ===
For the class entering in 2023, the law school accepted 65% of applicants, with 30.98% of those accepted enrolling. The average enrollee had a 148 LSAT score and 3.34 undergraduate GPA.

The law school offers several 3+3 early admissions programs with partner schools:

- Widener University 3+3 Early Admission Program
- Elizabethtown College Law Early Admission Program (LEAP)
- Wilson College 3+3 Early Admission Program
- Westminster College (Pennsylvania) 3+3 Early Admission Program

=== Central Pennsylvania Law Clinics ===
Widener Law Commonwealth operates the Central Pennsylvania Law Clinics (CPLC) which provide legal services to the local community. The CPLC runs four clinics:

- Administrative Law Clinic
- Consumer Law Clinic
- Elder Law Clinic
- Family Justice Clinic

=== Dauphin County Bar Association ===
Beginning in 2014, the law school created the a joint venture with the Dauphin County Bar Association, to create a legal incubator program. The program is housed within the Dauphin County Bar Association's office while Widener provides legal education and support. The program's mission is to allow new graduates the resources, space, and training needed to create new solo law firms which benefit the local community.

=== Bar pass rates ===
Below are the Ultimate Bar Passage rates, i.e. percentage of graduates passing in two years, from the law school's ABA reports:

- 2022 graduating class: 75.56%
- 2021 graduating class: 80.25%
- 2020 graduating class: 87.89%
- 2019 graduating class: 78.21%
- 2018 graduating class: 90.00%
- 2017 graduating class: 87.30%
- 2016 graduating class: 95.65%
- 2015 graduating class: 95.12%

The first-time bar passage rate for the 2024 graduating class was 54.00%.

== Employment ==
According to the American Bar Association's Employment Reports, 62.24% of the law school's 98 person 2022 graduating class was employed in long-term bar examination passage required positions, i.e. as attorneys, with most of those graduates employed in firms of 1-10 attorneys, while 62.24% of the 2022 class was employed in some capacity in Pennsylvania, with one employed in a federal clerkship, and with 12 employed in state, local, or territorial clerkships. For classes graduating in 2019, preLaw Magazine recognized Widener Law Commonwealth as the #1 school in their Employment Honor Roll that considered employment for those with low LSAT and GPA scores that was not based on employment percentage or included top schools, but was based on a linear regression equation that best predicted a law school’s employment rate considering its students’ average LSAT score and undergraduate GPA.

== Notable alumni ==
- Richard Alloway (2002) former senator in the Pennsylvania State Senate
- P. Kevin Brobson (1995) associate justice of the Supreme Court of Pennsylvania
- Mark B. Cohen (1993) former member of the Pennsylvania House of Representatives, judge of the court of common pleas
- Beau Correll (2007) attorney, political commentator, and founder of Free the Delegates
- Eugene DePasquale (2002) former auditor general of Pennsylvania
- William P. Doyle (2000) former commissioner of the Federal Maritime Commission
- Alina Habba (2010) acting United States Attorney for the District of New Jersey
- Michelle Henry (1994) appointed Pennsylvania attorney general (2023-2024)
- Wayne Langerholc (2000) senator for the 35th district in the Pennsylvania State Senate
- Don McGahn (1994) former White House counsel to Donald Trump, former commissioner of the Federal Election Commission
- Mark S. McNaughton (2003) former member of the Pennsylvania House of Representatives for the 104th District
- Patrick Murphy (1999) former member of the United States House of Representatives
- Jim Schultz (1998) former associate White House counsel under Donald Trump
- Doug Steinhardt (1994) senator for the 23rd district in the New Jersey Senate, former chair of the New Jersey Republican Party
- Henry W. Van Eck (1998) chief judge of the US bankruptcy court for the Middle District of Pennsylvania
- Ann M. Yastishock (1994) United States ambassador to Papua New Guinea
