= ABI gene family member 3 =

Protein-coding gene in the species Homo sapiens

ABI3

Identifiers
- Aliases: ABI3, NESH, SSH3BP3, ABI family member 3
- External IDs: OMIM: 606363; MGI: 1913860; GeneCards: ABI3

Gene location (Human)
Chr.	Chromosome 17 (human)
Band	17q21.32	Start	49,210,411 bp
Band	17q21.32	End	49,223,225 bp

Gene location (Mouse)
Chr.	Chromosome 11 (mouse)
Band	11|11 D	Start	95,720,900 bp
Band	11|11 D	End	95,733,302 bp
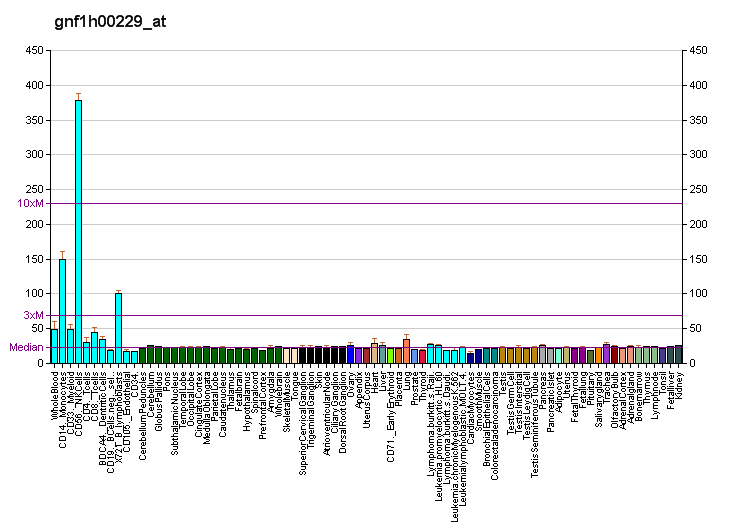
RNA expression pattern
Bgee	Human / Mouse (ortholog); Top expressed in: granulocyte; spleen; monocyte; blood; testicle; appendix; parotid gland; apex of heart; lymph node; upper lobe of left lung / Top expressed in: thymus; mesenteric lymph nodes; interventricular septum; granulocyte; spleen; tail of embryo; blood; gastrula; right lung; lumbar subsegment of spinal cord; More reference expression data
BioGPS	More reference expression data
Gene ontology
Molecular function	protein binding; identical protein binding; SH3 domain binding
Cellular component	cytoplasm; intracellular anatomical structure; membrane; lamellipodium
Biological process	peptidyl-tyrosine phosphorylation; regulation of cell migration
Sources:Amigo / QuickGO
Orthologs
Databases	NCBI: entry; OMA: entry
Species	Human	Mouse
Entrez	51225	66610
Ensembl	ENSG00000108798	ENSMUSG00000018381
UniProt	Q9P2A4	Q8BYZ1
RefSeq (mRNA)	NM_001135186; NM_016428	NM_001163464; NM_025659
RefSeq (protein)	NP_001128658; NP_057512	NP_001156936; NP_079935
Location (UCSC)	Chr 17: 49.21 – 49.22 Mb	Chr 11: 95.72 – 95.73 Mb
PubMed search
- Wikidata
View/Edit Human	View/Edit Mouse

ABI gene family member 3 (ABI3) also known as new molecule including SH3 (Nesh) is a protein that in humans is encoded by the ABI3 gene.

== Function ==
This gene encodes a member of an adaptor protein family. Members of this family encode proteins containing a homeobox homology domain, proline rich region and Src-homology 3 (SH3) domain. The encoded protein inhibits ectopic metastasis of tumor cells as well as cell migration. This may be accomplished through interaction with p21-activated kinases.

== See also ==
- ABI1
- ABI2
- ABI3BP
