= Schachner =

Schachner is a German surname. Notable people with the surname include:

- Bernhard Schachner (born 1986), Austrian footballer
- Franz Schachner (born 1950), Austrian luger
- Judith Byron Schachner (born 1951), American children's book writer and illustrator
- Max Schachner (1914–1944), German SS officer
- Nat Schachner (1895–1955), American writer
- Sarah Schachner (born 1985), American composer
- Walter Schachner (born 1957), Austrian footballer and manager

== See also ==
- Schechner
