= Jacki McInnes =

South African artist (born 1966)

- Born: 1966 (age 59–60); Durban, South Africa
- Website: jackimcinnes.net

Jacki McInnes (born 1966) is a South African artist living and working in Johannesburg. Her art tends towards a style of binary interrogation: migrancy versus xenophobia, material aspirations versus poverty, the survival strategies of newly urbanised populations, and the complexities associated with the lived realities of late-capitalism. Current work, in particular, explores the contradictions inherent in present-day human thought and behaviour, especially regarding the disconnect between material aspiration, rampant consumerism, wasteful practices, and their disastrous effect on our planet and ultimate future.

== Career ==
=== Education ===
McInnes received her BA (FA) cum laude in 2001, also winning the UNISA Fine Art Faculty Medal in that year. She went on to complete an MFA at the Michaelis School of the Arts, University of Cape Town in 2004.

Since completing her studies, McInnes has won numerous awards and has been an artist-in-residence in Switzerland, Brazil and Germany.

=== Exhibitions ===
Solo Exhibitions:

- 2012: de Magnete, University of Johannesburg Gallery, Johannesburg (Exhibition travelled to the North West University and the University of the Free State Galleries.)
- 2008: Strutting, Flying & Dying, ABSA Gallery, Johannesburg.
- 2008: Alienation Adaptation, Graskop Hotel, Graskop.
- 2006: Patterns in Silence, Women's Jail, Constitution Hill, Johannesburg
- 2005: The Vocabulary of Ambiguity: For Her, Gordart Gallery, Johannesburg.
- 2004: The Vocabulary of Ambiguity: For Her, Bell-Roberts Contemporary, Cape Town.
- 2004: Four Exhibitions Under One Roof, Artspace Fine Art Gallery, Johannesburg.
- 2002: Salt in the Wound, AVA Gallery, Cape Town.

Selected Group Exhibitions:

- 2012: Winter Exhibition, Everard Read Gallery, Johannesburg.
- 2011: MAP South Africa, University of Johannesburg Gallery, Johannesburg (Catalogue).
- 2010: Ecotopian States, University of Johannesburg Gallery, Johannesburg (e-Catalogue).
- 2010: Spier Contemporary Finalist Exhibition, City Hall, Cape Town (Catalogue).
- 2009: Urban Animal, ABSA Gallery, Johannesburg (Catalogue).
- 2007: Rendezvous: Focus Sculpture, Morningside, Johannesburg and Potchefstroom University (Catalogue).
- 2007: Bliss, Fried Contemporary, Pretoria.
- 2007: Ekurhuleni Fine Arts Award, Johannesburg.
- 2006: Review, 34 Long Fine Art, Cape Town.
- 2005: New Acquisitions, 34 Long Fine Art, Cape Town.
- 2004: iaab: Inside Out, St. Alban-Rheinweg 54, Basel, Switzerland.
- 2003: AidsArt / South Africa, Iziko: South African National Gallery (Catalogue).
- 2002: Aids and South Africa: The Social Expression of a Pandemic, Wellesley College, Massachusetts, USA.
- 2000: !Xoe²: Off Site, Bell-Roberts Contemporary Art, Cape Town.
- 2000: !Xoe²: Site-specific, Nieu Bethesda and Grahamstown (Catalogue).
- 2000: ABSA Atelier Competition, National Finalist Exhibition, Johannesburg (Catalogue).

== Works ==
=== House 38: Hazardous Objects ===
McInnes' work consists of exact replicas of industrial and consumer cast-offs collected by informal recyclers living in downtown Johannesburg, recreated in beaten lead. McInnes turns the focus from these objects to the lives of the people behind them.

In his essay Recycling the Apocalypse Michael Titlestad takes McInnes' House 38 series of work as a departure point for a treatise on end-time psychology. By examining the strategies of Johannesburg's informal recyclers, Titlestad suggests that the Judeo-Christian understanding of a rectilinear eschatology is flawed. He posits instead endless cycles of existence. "The world is already apocalyptic, just not all at the same time." Michael Titlestad carries his argument forward in an extended essay, entitled The Logic of the Apocalypse: A Clerical Rejoinder, published by Safundi: The Journal of South African and American Studies in February 2013.

=== The Vocabulary of Ambiguity – for her ===
This show uses the starting point of the decision to abort a pregnancy and from there explores the reproductive role of women in society. McInnes uses salt, lead, and found materials to create mixed media works addressing the issues.

== Gallery ==
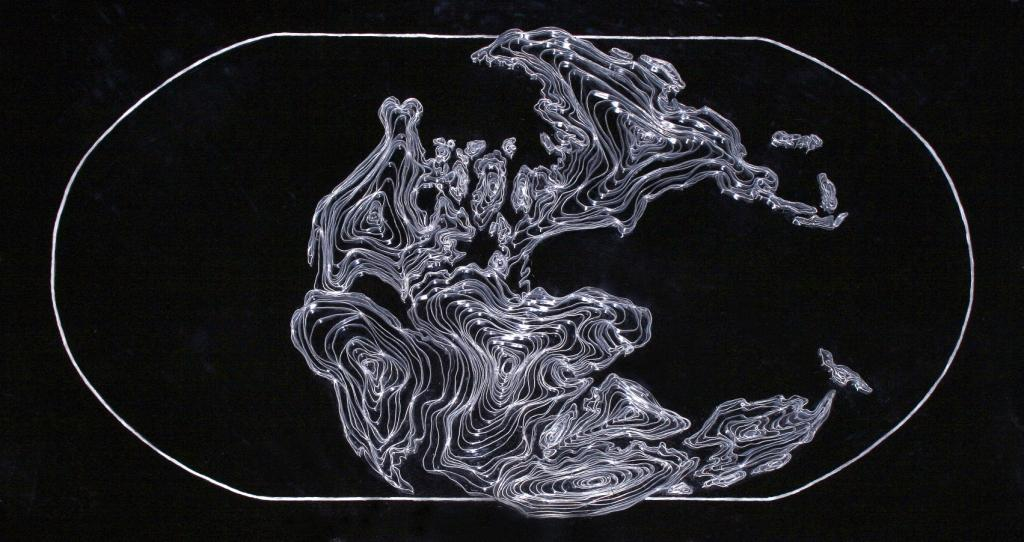

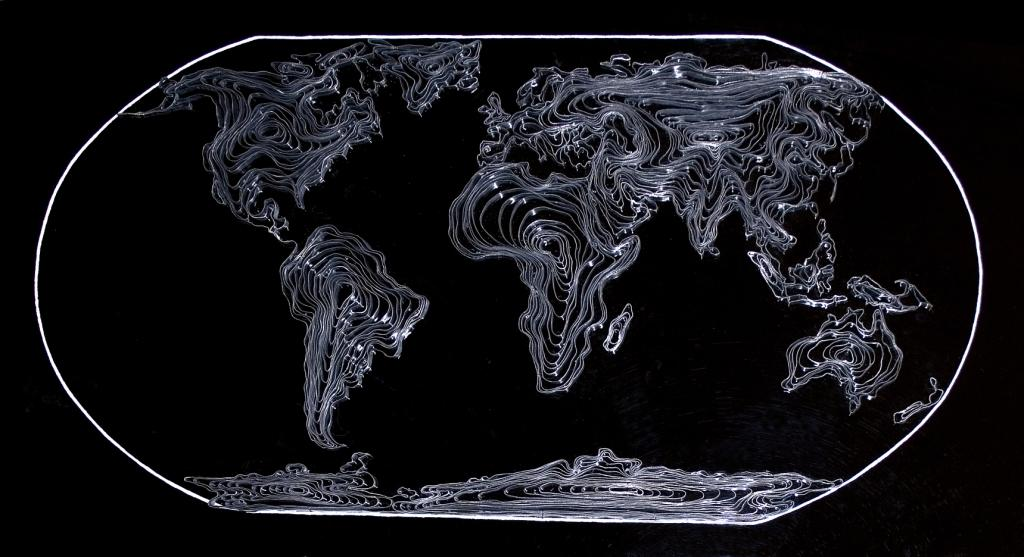

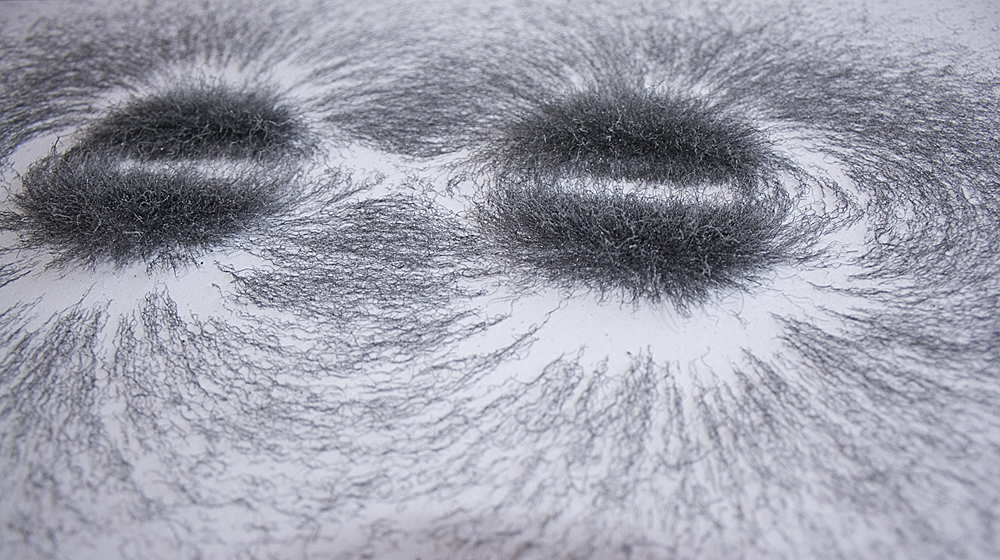

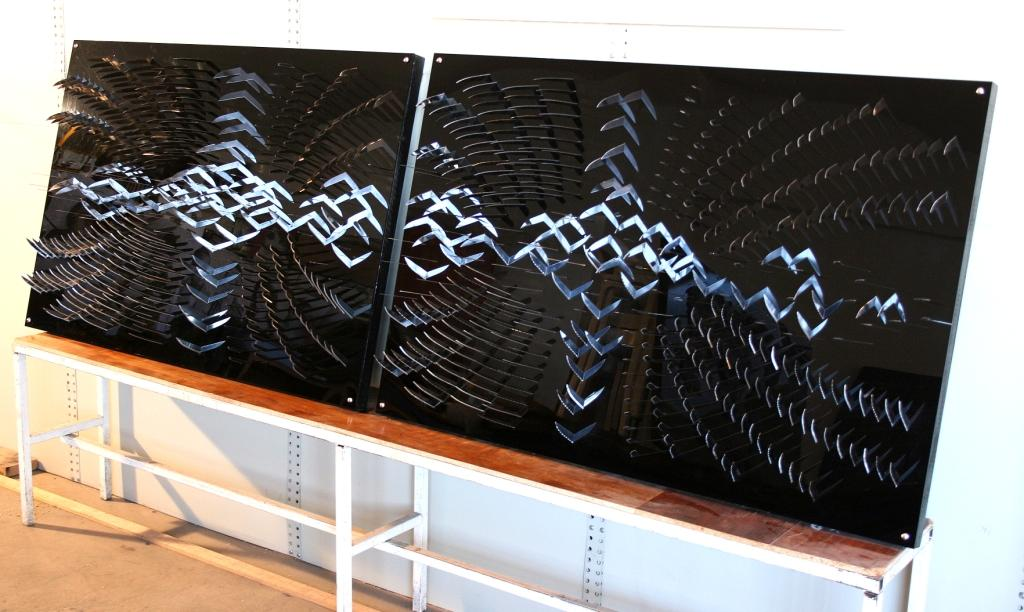

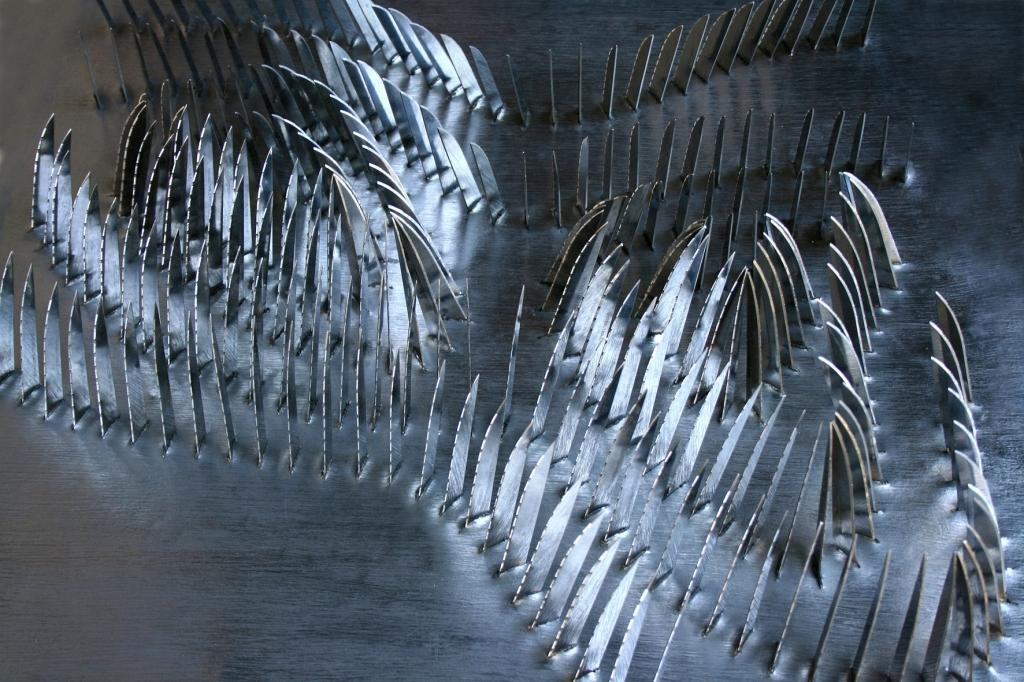

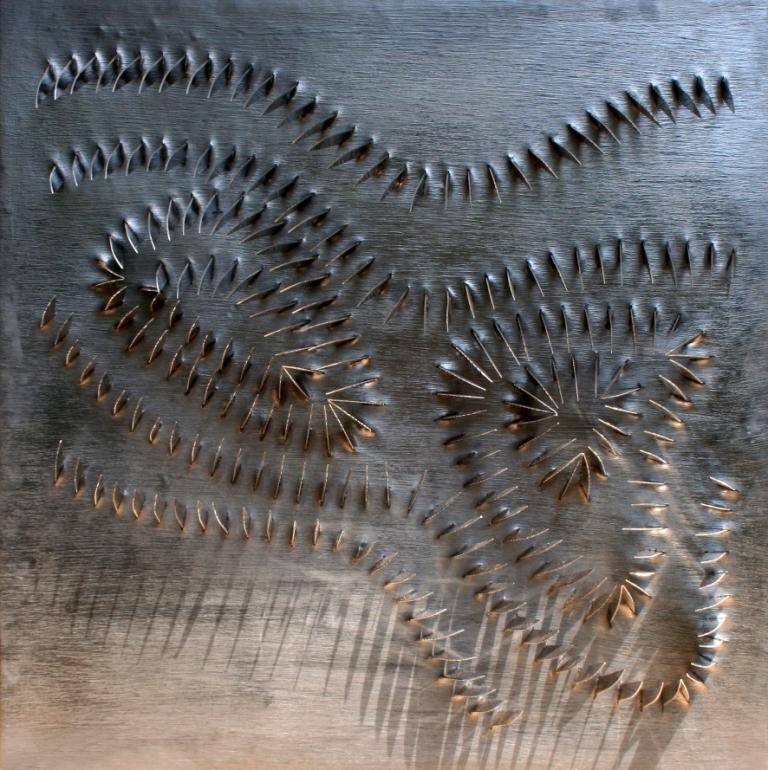

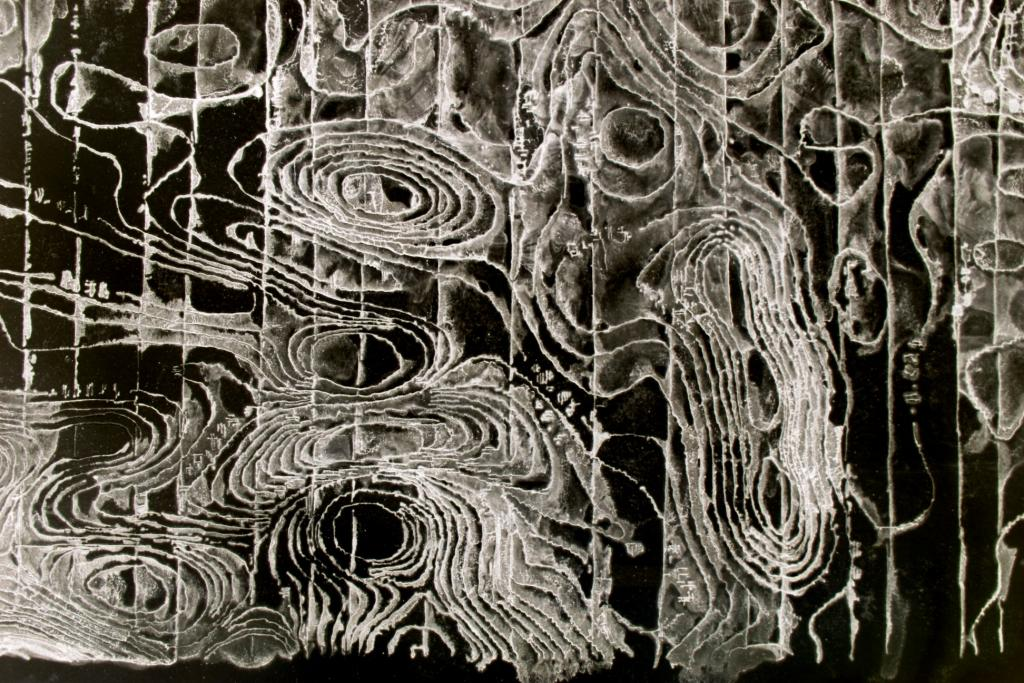

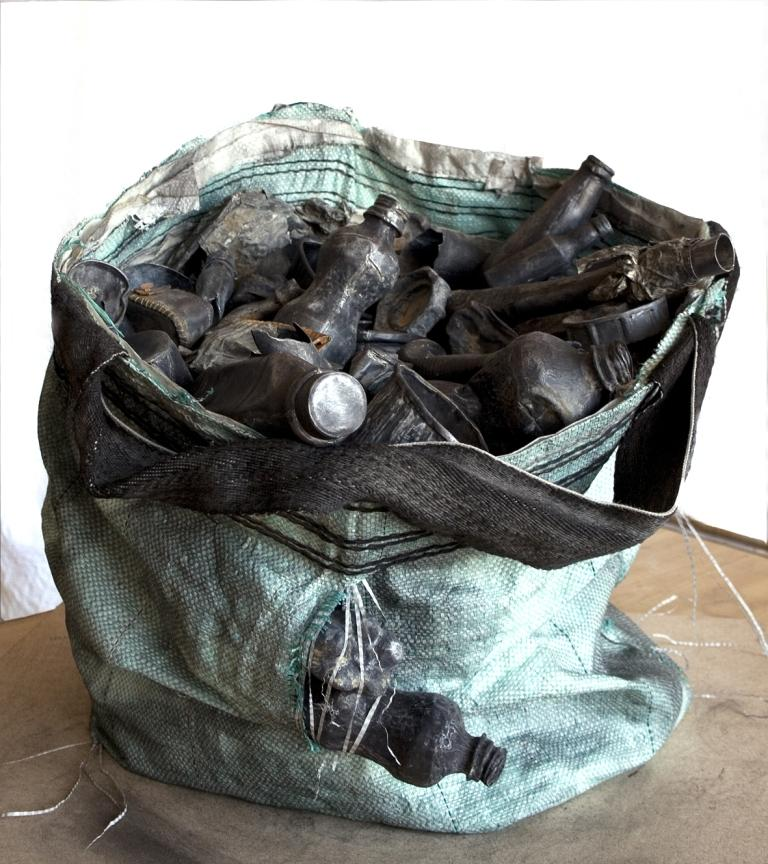

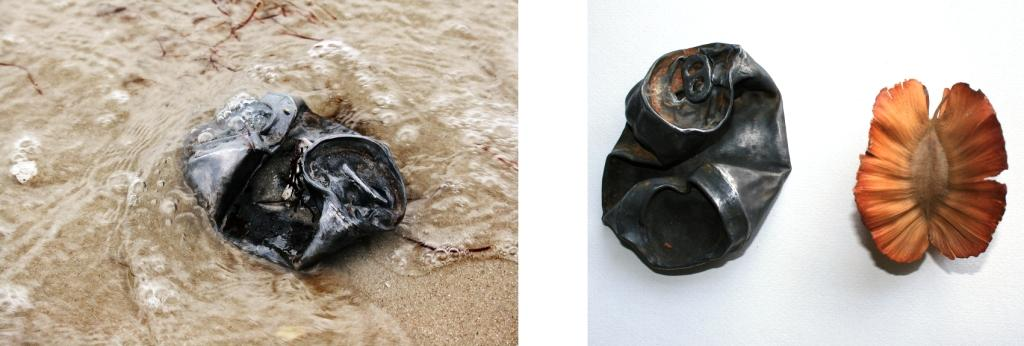

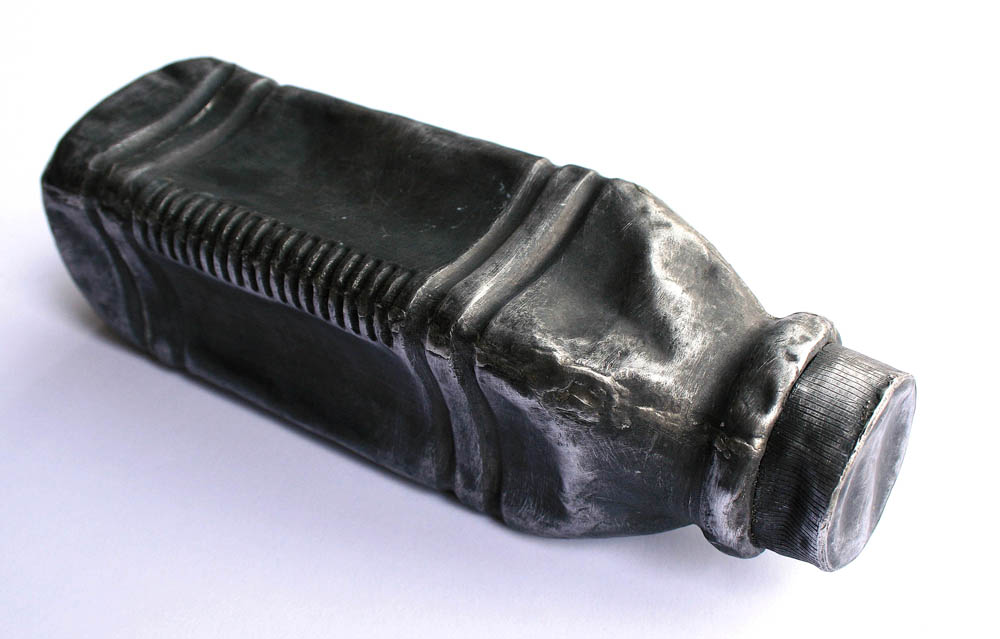

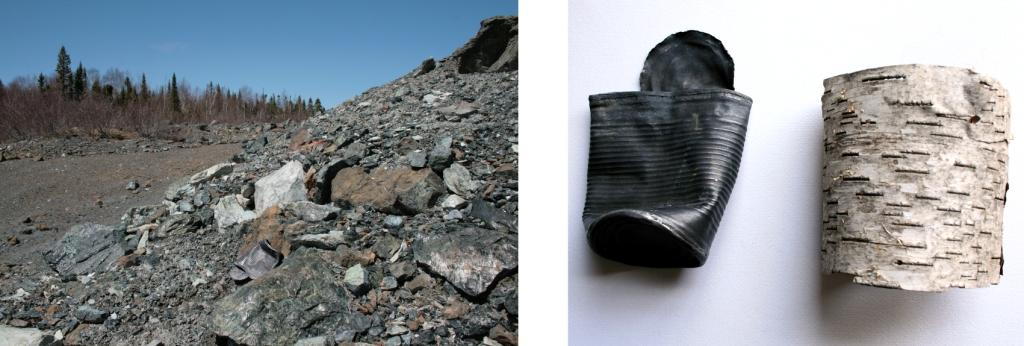

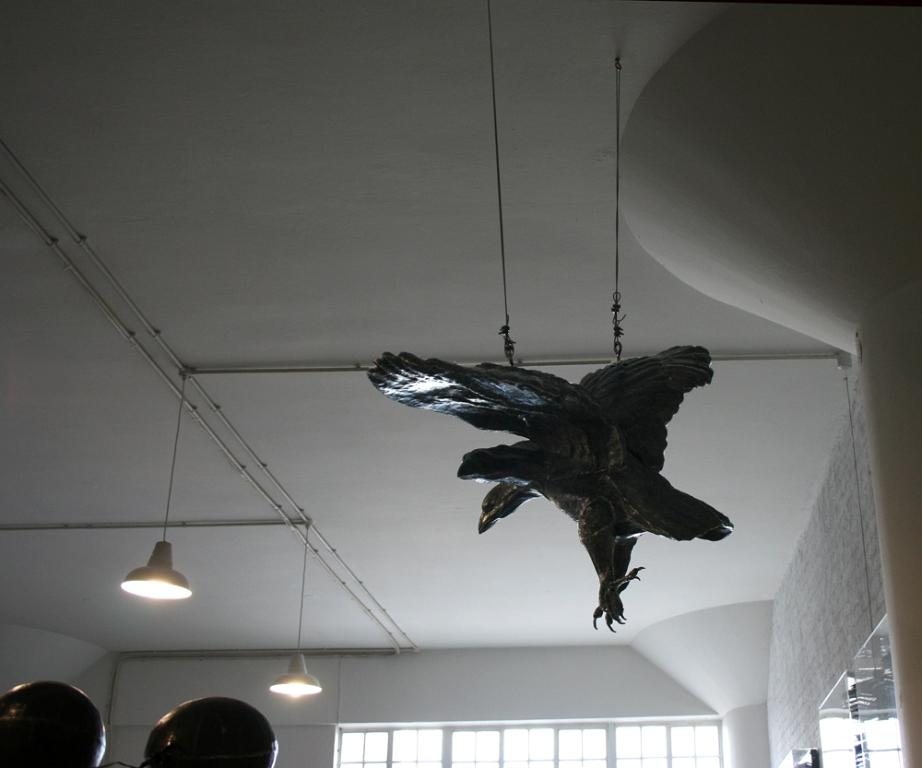

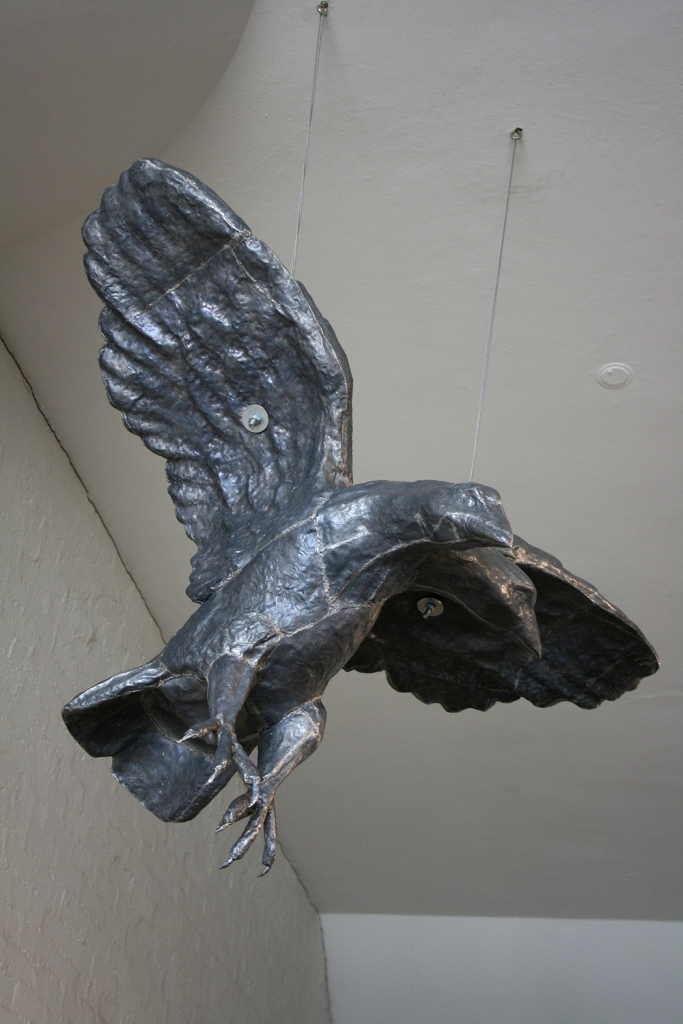

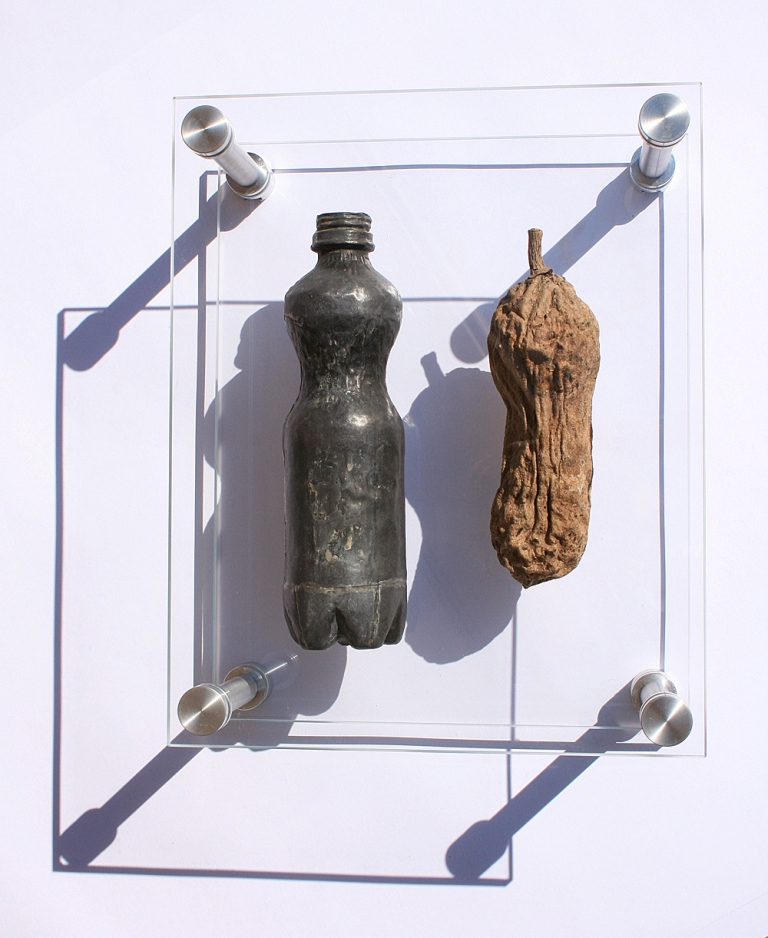

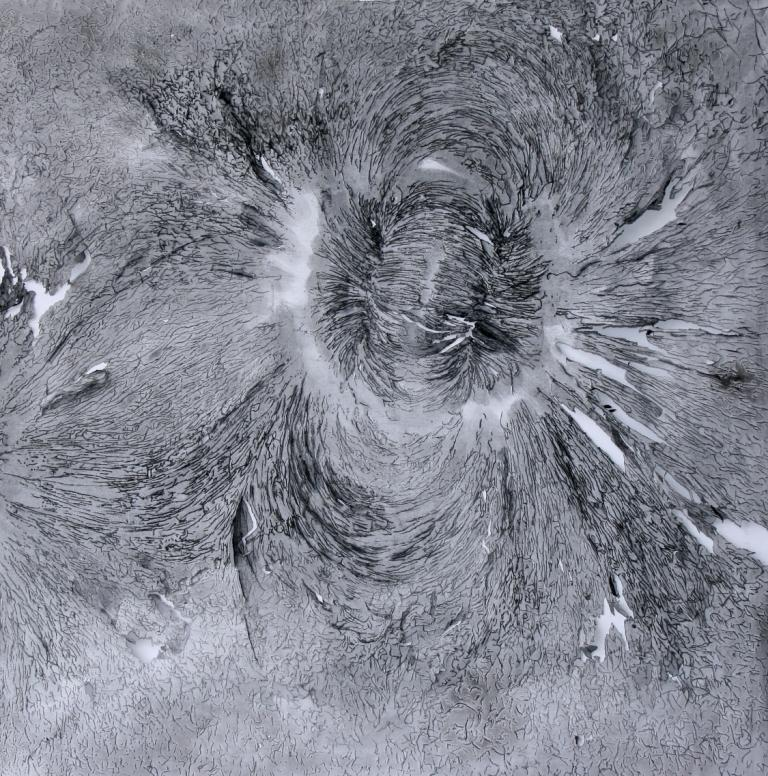

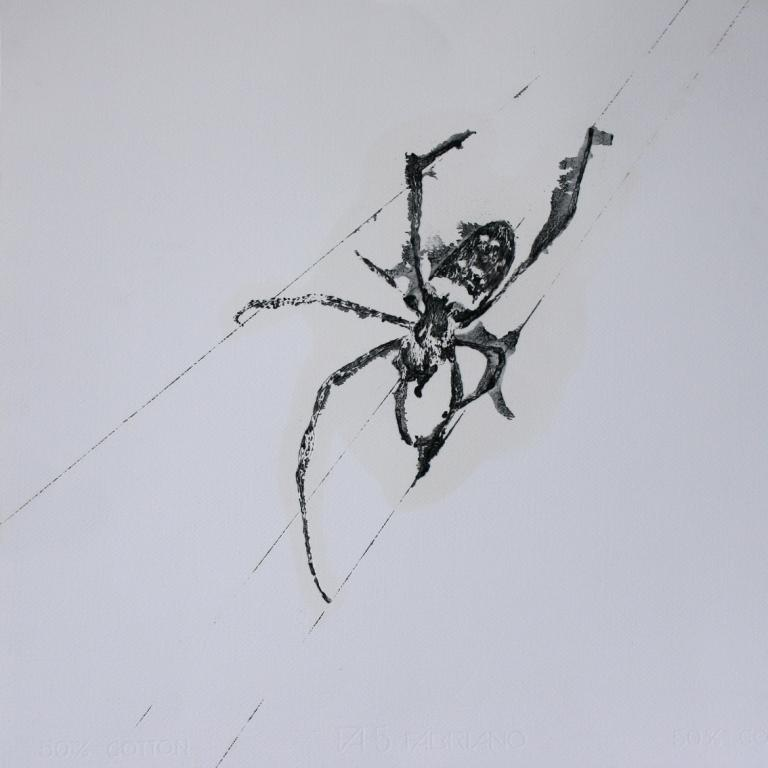

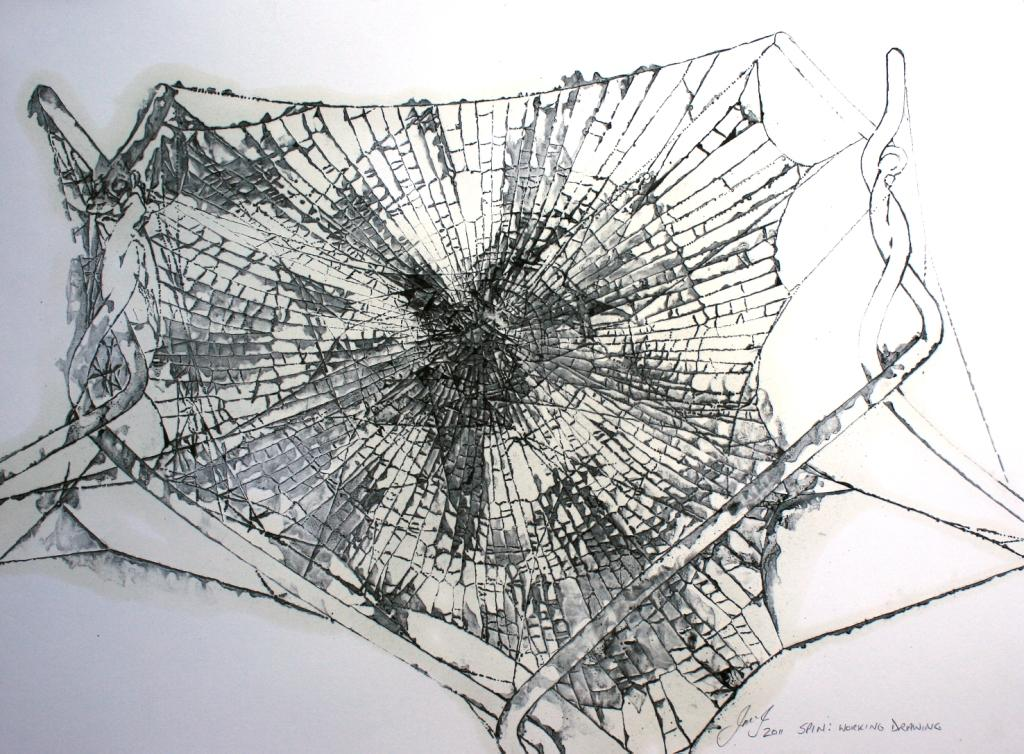

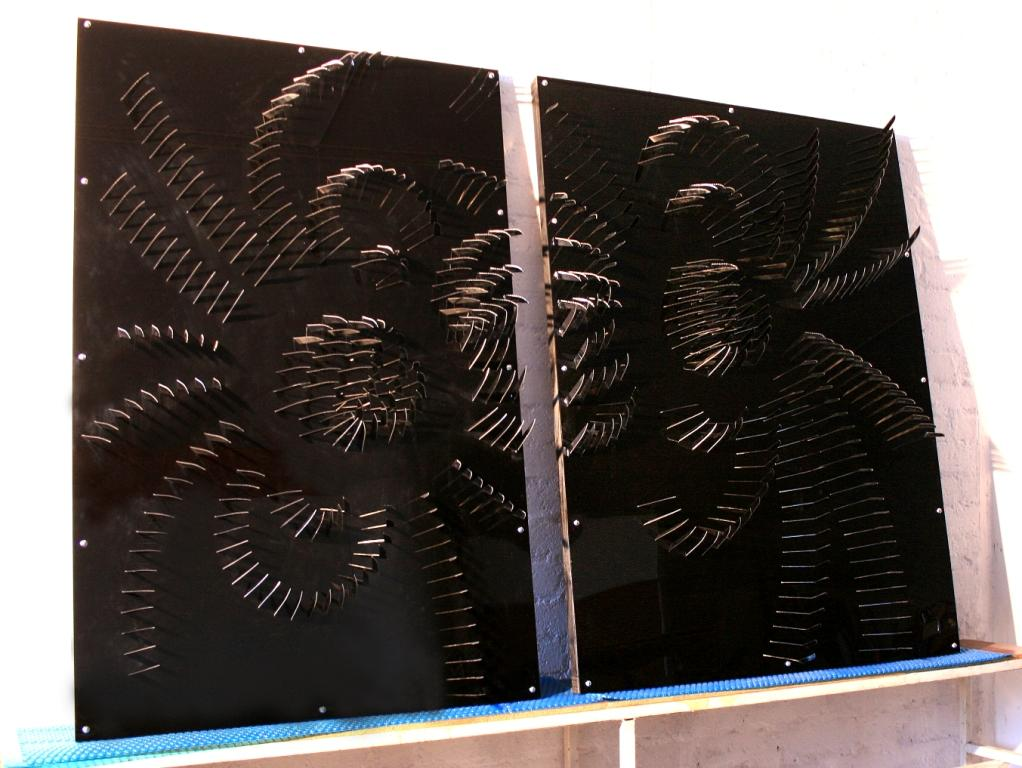

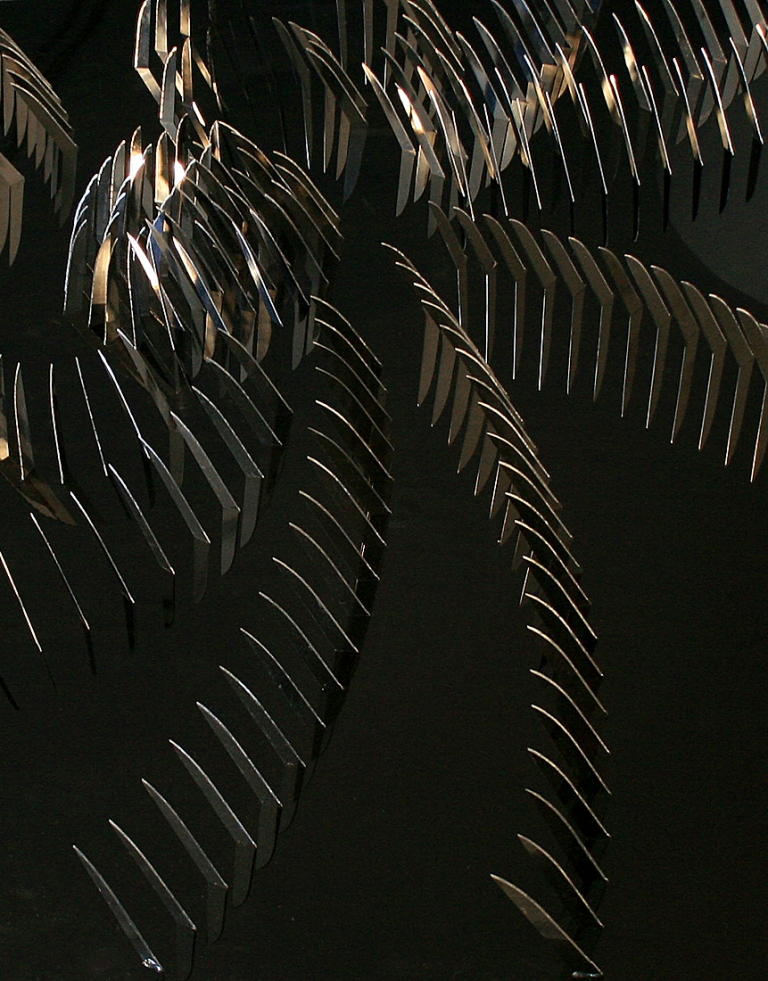
