= Jacki Zehner =

Canadian philanthropist and financer (born 1964)

- Born: Jacki Hoffman; October 8, 1964 (age 61); Kelowna, British Columbia, Canada
- Education: University of British Columbia
- Occupations: Partner - Goldman Sachs, CEO - Women Moving Millions
- Years active: 1988–present
- Spouse: Greg Zehner (m. 1995)
- Children: 2

Jacki Zehner (née Hoffman; born October 8, 1964) is a Canadian philanthropist, financier, angel investor, writer, speaker, and film producer. In 1996, she became the youngest woman and first female trader to be made a partner of Goldman Sachs. She left Goldman in 2002 and became a founding partner of Circle Financial Group. In 2009, she became a member of Women Moving Millions and later served and the organization's founding president. In 2012, Zehner was elected to the board of trustees of the Sundance Institute. She has served as the president of the Jacquelyn and Gregory Zehner Foundation since 1998.

== Career ==
Jacki Zehner began working at Goldman Sachs in 1988 as an analyst, and later moved into trading mortgage backed securities. In 1996, Zehner became the youngest woman and first female trader to be invited into the partnership at Goldman. In 2000, Zehner moved into the executive suite to help manage the career's of Goldman's managing directors. Zehner left Goldman Sachs in 2002.

After leaving Goldman, Zehner became founding partner of Circle Financial Group, a private wealth management organization consisting of a small number of women committed to managing their families' assets and philanthropic undertakings. In 2009, Zehner became a member of Women Moving Millions, and 2012, became the founding president of the organization. In 2017, in recognition of her extensive contributions to the organization, Zehner was named co-founder of Women Moving Millions alongside Helen LaKelly Hunt. Jacki served as its chief engagement officer from 2012 to 2016.

Zehner is an active angel investor in women owned companies, including LearnVest, Seed & Spark, Mogul, Apolitical, Wait, What?, Your Tango, and Circular Board.

Since 2012, Zehner has invested in social issue documentaries, including in the role of executive producer for Ready to Fly, The Hunting Ground, Hot Girls Wanted, and 50/50,

Zehner has been the president of the Jacquelyn and Gregory Zehner Foundation since 1998.

== Professional affiliations ==
Zehner serves on the board of trustees of Sundance Institute, and is a former board member of the Women's Funding Network, the Breast Cancer Research Foundation, The National Council for Research on Women, the University of British Columbia, The Center for Talent Innovation, The Geena Davis Institute on Gender in Media, The Indiana University Women's Philanthropy Institute Council, and Sundance Institute's Women at Sundance.

== Writing and speaking ==
Zehner is a writer and consultant on issues relating to women, career success, wealth, investing, and high-impact philanthropy. She has published a blog online since 2008.

Zehner has given speeches at corporate events for Google, Goldman Sachs, UBS, and JP Morgan, and non-profit organizations such as the Sundance Institute and the YWCA.

In 2012, Zehner delivered a Ted Talk titled "Strap In: Closing the Gender Gap". In 2016, Zehner was profiled on MAKERS.

== Awards ==
Zehner has been the recipient of numerous awards throughout her career. In 2016, Zehner was named as a Distinguished Fellow at the Athena Center for Leadership Studies at Barnard College.
