= ʽAbis =

Coordinates: 14°31′15″N 45°22′30″E

ʽAbis is a village in Maʼrib Governorate, Yemen.
