= Tomer Shechner =

Israeli clinical psychologist

- תומר שכנר
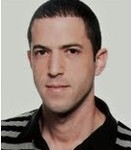

Academic background
- Education: Tel Aviv University

Academic work
- Discipline: Psychology
- Sub-discipline: Developmental Psychopathology
- Institutions: University of Haifa

Tomer Shechner (Hebrew: תומר שכנר) is an Israeli clinical psychologist, researcher and professor currently heading the Developmental Psychopathology Lab at the University of Haifa.

His major line of research focuses on understanding the interaction between biological, cognitive, behavioral and environmental factors in the development of anxiety disorders.

== Education ==
Shechner completed his M.A. and Ph.D. degrees in Clinical Psychology at Tel-Aviv University. He completed his first post-doctoral training at the Adler Developmental Psychopathology Institute in Israel and then traveled to the U.S for his second post-doctoral training at the Section of Developmental Affective Neuroscience at the National Institute of Mental Health under the supervision of Dr. Danny Pine. He completed his clinical internship at Schneider Children's Medical Center and is a licensed clinical psychologist.
