= Abi Kusno Nachran =

Indonesian politician (1940–2006)

Abi Kusno Nachran (1940 in Kalimantan, Borneo, Indonesia – July 24, 2006) was an Indonesian rainforest preservation activist.

== Life ==
Abi Kusno Nachran was a Dayak, born in the rainforest of Kalimantan Tengah in Borneo. As a young man, he left his village to study. After dropping out of school, he worked in the municipal government of Pangkalanbun, where he participated in the widespread corruption and was also involved in the cover-up of illegal logging operations.

After a pilgrimage to Mecca, he began to feel ashamed of his behavior. He traveled the countryside and found that the forest of his childhood, among others, was destroyed. Nachran began fighting for the preservation of rainforests. As a journalist, he wrote articles against forest destruction and made inquiries against illegal loggers and dealers. He received multiple death threats. In November 2001, he was able to ensure that ships with 54,000 cubic meters of illegally harvested timber were seized.

20 days later, he was attacked in Pangkalanbun by 20 men with machetes and severely injured. His body was found in a pool of his own blood, and, believed to be dead, he was taken to a mortuary. By moving a toe on his left foot, he was able to move the shroud away and provide proof of his vitality. He was then taken to a hospital. The Indonesian doctor who treated him and studied in Hamburg and suggested that he be operated upon there. To come up with the €15,000 for the operation, Nachran sold his property and got the remainder from donors, with the hospital waiving a portion of the fee. Even after the surgery, he remained weakened by his injuries.

Nachran continued his struggle, becoming a member of the Indonesian parliament in Jakarta. In 2003, he again traveled to Germany to receive the Dr.-Goetze-Geo-Preis.

On 24 July 2006, Abi Kusno Nachran was killed in a traffic accident in Cirebon and died at the age of 64.
