= AB1 (disambiguation) =

AB1 is a French television channel.

AB1 may also refer to:

- Bernard AB 1, a French biplane
- Aichi AB-1, a Japanese biplane
- Class-AB1 amplifier, a type of power amplifier
- AB1 in the AB postcode area
- AB1, the Athens Biennale in 2007
- USS Kearsarge (AB-1), a crane ship
- Alberta Highway 1, a major highway in Alberta and a segment of the Trans-Canada Highway
- Alisson Becker, a Brazilian goalkeeper

== See also ==
- ABI (disambiguation), letters A, B, I
