= Correll v. Herring =

Correll v. Herring et al., 212 F.Supp.3d 584 (E.D. Vir. 2016), was the 2016 legal decision for a case argued before the United States District Court for the Eastern District of Virginia over political party delegates. The case centered on the constitutionality of the Commonwealth of Virginia's election laws regarding the binding of political party delegates to a presidential nomination convention as part of the Never Trump movement prior to the 2016 Republican National Convention. The case was filed on June 24, 2016. On July 11, 2016, Judge Robert Payne issued a memorandum opinion permanently enjoining the Commonwealth of Virginia from enforcing the section of Virginia election law under challenge. The ruling is considered a symbolic victory in Republican delegate efforts to deny Donald Trump the Republican nomination.

== Case history ==
On March 1, 2016, the Republican and Democratic parties held presidential primaries in Virginia. Trump and Hillary Clinton won those contests. Under Virginia law, Republican and Democratic delegates were obligated to vote, on the first national convention ballot, for Trump and Clinton, respectively. However, the representative for Virginia's 10th Congressional District, Carroll Boston “Beau” Correll Jr, voted against the results of his district - the winner being Donald Trump. Correll stated that he "believes that Donald Trump is unfit to serve as President of the United States". This defiance is illegal in Virginia, where “delegates and alternates shall be bound to vote on the first ballot at the national convention for the candidate receiving the most votes in the primary." This is a Class 1 misdemeanor, which is punishable by a fine of $2,500, twelve months of prison, or both.

Correll's main argument is that the law requiring him to vote for the candidate that receives the move votes in the primary violates his First Amendment right of free speech. Herring, the opposition, said that Correll's argument should be deemed invalid because of prejudice. His evidence for this was that Correll had at least two months to file this lawsuit, but he waited until just before the Republican National Convention to give the case as little time as possible to be fully argued.

== Results ==
In 2016, the Court ruled in favor of Correll. Judge Robert E. Payne ruled that "For the foregoing reasons, judgment will be entered in Correll's favor on Counts I and II and the Commonwealth will be permanently enjoined from enforcing Va. Code § 24.2–545(D).". The case has not been challenged or overturned.

== See also ==
- Free the Delegates
