= Cholo (video game) =

1986 video game

- Developer: Solid Image
- Publisher: Firebird
- Designers: Glyn Williams; Joey Headen
- Platforms: BBC Micro, Amstrad CPC, Commodore 64, ZX Spectrum
- Release: 1987
- Genres: First-person shooter, vehicle simulation
- Mode: Single-player

Cholo is a video game released in 1987 for the BBC Micro. It was ported to the ZX Spectrum, Amstrad CPC, and Commodore 64. Cholo uses wireframe 3D visuals and has nonlinear gameplay.

== Gameplay ==
The story is set out in a novella which was included in the game's packaging. Following a nuclear war, humanity is trapped underground by a robot defence system that rules the irradiated surface. Your character assumes control of a robot drone, transmitting to a terminal below ground, and is given the task of freeing the trapped humans.

The robot—"Rizzo the rat", a diagnostic model—is equipped with a single laser, computer/robot link capabilities and very limited armour. The player's first task is to explore the city and take over stronger robots in order to complete the mission. Gameplay consists of movement around a virtual 3D world, taking over other robots by shooting them until 'paralysed', running into them and entering a password to gain access.

Each robot has different properties. "Aviata" is an aircraft who can fly and transport other robots; "Igor" is a hacker who can access computer systems. The player can only control one robot at a time. All robots have four slots for 'rampacks' which are essentially files, either text files or programs which add extra functionality to your robot. The gameplay often involves swapping between robots in order to complete a certain task.

A deliberately incomplete map showing the pre-war city shipped with the game in the form of an A3 size poster. The map also contains a partial robot identification chart.

=== Robot types ===
There are a number of different robot types in Cholo, nearly all of which can be controlled at some point in the game.

Hacker and Flying eye robots

- Vidbot - Fixed position camera robot
- Leadcoat - Heavy duty radiation proof robot
- Ratdroid - Diagnostic robot
- Hacker - Hacker robot (unarmed)
- Flying Eye - Mobile camera robot
- Autodoc - Maintenance robot
- Guard - Police robot
- Grundon - Police tank robot
- Flyboy - Aircraft robot
- Ship - Ship robot

== Legacy ==
Ovine by Design published a remake of the game using Tron-like graphics as freeware for Windows, with the approval of the original creators.
