= ABI3BP =

Protein-coding gene in the species Homo sapiens

Identifiers
- Aliases: ABI3BP, NESHBP, TARSH, ABI family member 3 binding protein
- External IDs: OMIM: 606279; GeneCards: ABI3BP

Gene location (Human)
Chr.	Chromosome 3 (human)
Band	3q12.2	Start	100,749,156 bp
Band	3q12.2	End	100,993,515 bp
RNA expression pattern
Bgee	Human / Mouse (ortholog); Top expressed in: decidua; synovial joint; Achilles tendon; vena cava; skin of hip; epithelium of colon; saphenous vein; superficial temporal artery; parietal pleura; urethra / n/a; More reference expression data
BioGPS	n/a
Gene ontology
Molecular function	glycosaminoglycan binding; heparin binding; collagen binding; extracellular matrix structural constituent
Cellular component	extracellular matrix; interstitial matrix; extracellular space; extracellular region; collagen-containing extracellular matrix
Biological process	extracellular matrix organization; positive regulation of cell-substrate adhesion
Sources:Amigo / QuickGO
Orthologs
Databases	NCBI: entry; OMA: entry
Species	Human	Mouse
Entrez	25890	n/a
Ensembl	ENSG00000154175	n/a
UniProt	Q7Z7G0	n/a
RefSeq (mRNA)	NM_015429; NM_001349329; NM_001349330; NM_001349331; NM_001349332 NM_001365642; NM_001365643; NM_001375547; NM_001375549; NM_001375550; NM_001377332	n/a
RefSeq (protein)	NP_056244; NP_001336258; NP_001336259; NP_001336260; NP_001336261 NP_001352571; NP_001352572; NP_001362476; NP_001362478; NP_001362479; NP_001364261	n/a
Location (UCSC)	Chr 3: 100.75 – 100.99 Mb	n/a
PubMed search		n/a
- Wikidata
View/Edit Human

ABI family member 3 binding protein is a protein that in humans is encoded by the ABI3BP gene.
