= Jaci =

Jaci may refer to:

- Jaci (river), in Sicily, Italy
- Jaci, São Paulo, Brazil
- Jaci (goddess), moon deity of the Tupi and Guaraní peoples
- Acireale, a city in Sicily, Italy, locally known as Jaci
