= Abi (Cholo) =

Mountain in Khumbu, Nepal

- Cholo
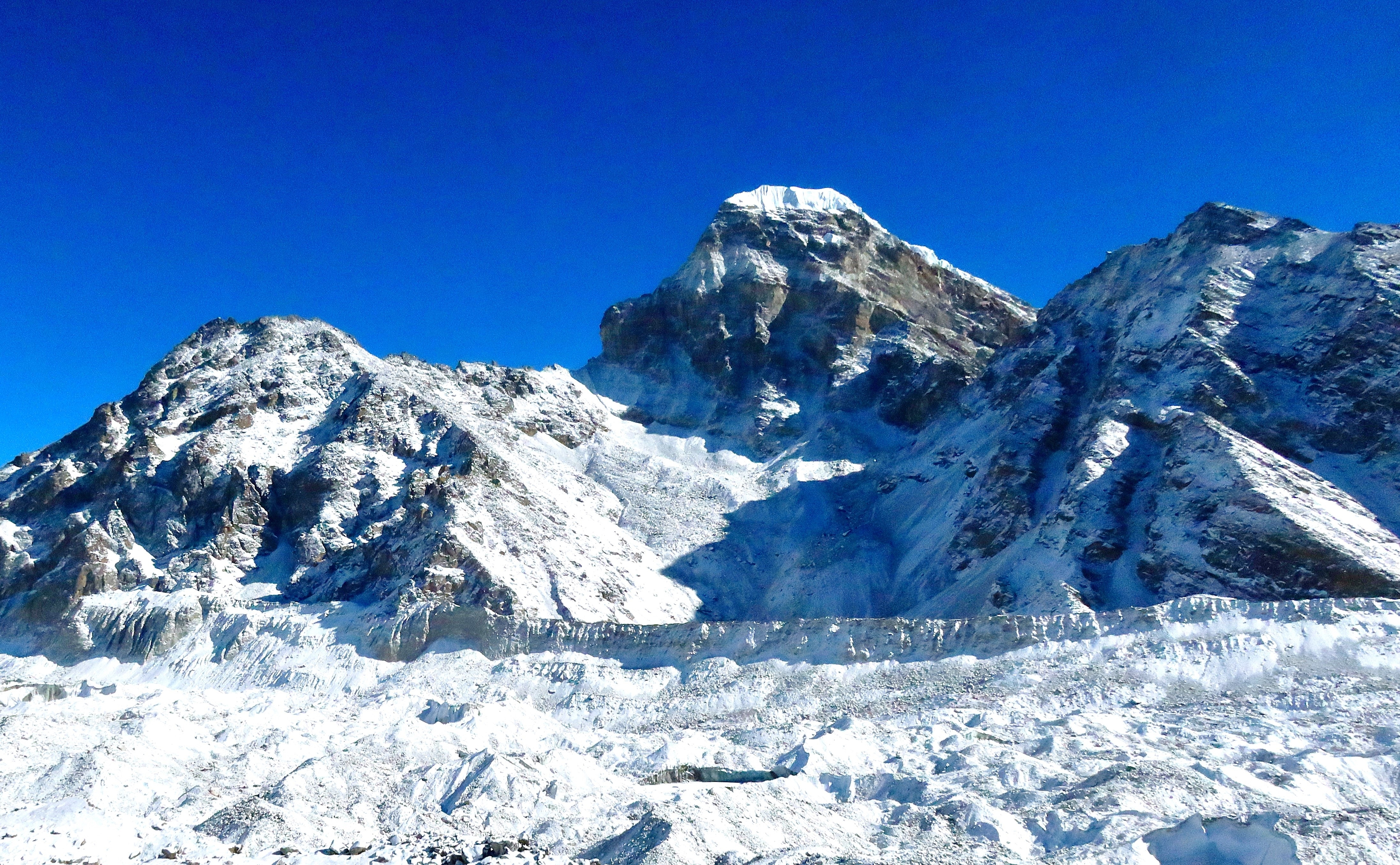
- Southwest aspect

Highest point
- Elevation: 6,043 m (19,826 ft)
- Prominence: 423 m (1,388 ft)
- Isolation: 1.62 km (1.01 mi)
- Listing: Mountains of Nepal
- Coordinates: 27°59′01″N 86°43′14″E

Geography
- Location within Nepal
- Interactive map of Abi
- Location: Khumbu
- Country: Nepal
- Province: Koshi
- District: Solukhumbu
- Protected area: Sagarmatha National Park
- Parent range: Himalayas

Abi, also known as Cholo, or Kangchung, is a mountain in Nepal.

== Description ==
Abi is a 6,043-metre (19,826-foot) summit in the Khumbu region of the Nepalese Himalayas. It is situated 20 kilometres (12 mi) west of Mount Everest and four kilometres (2.5 mi) northeast of Gokyo in Sagarmatha National Park. Topographic relief is significant as the summit rises 900 metres (2,953 ft) above the Gaunara Glacier in 0.6 kilometre (0.37 mi). Precipitation runoff from the mountain's slopes drains into the Dudh Koshi. Trekkers pass by this peak en route to Everest Base Camp. This peak is a popular climbing destination and is on the list of permitted trekking peaks.

== Climate ==
Based on the Köppen climate classification, Abi is located in a tundra climate zone with cold, snowy winters, and cool summers. Weather systems coming off the Bay of Bengal are forced upwards by the Himalaya mountains (orographic lift), causing heavy precipitation in the form of rainfall and snowfall. Mid-June through early-August is the monsoon season. The months of April, May, September, and October offer the most favorable weather for viewing or climbing this peak.

== Gallery ==
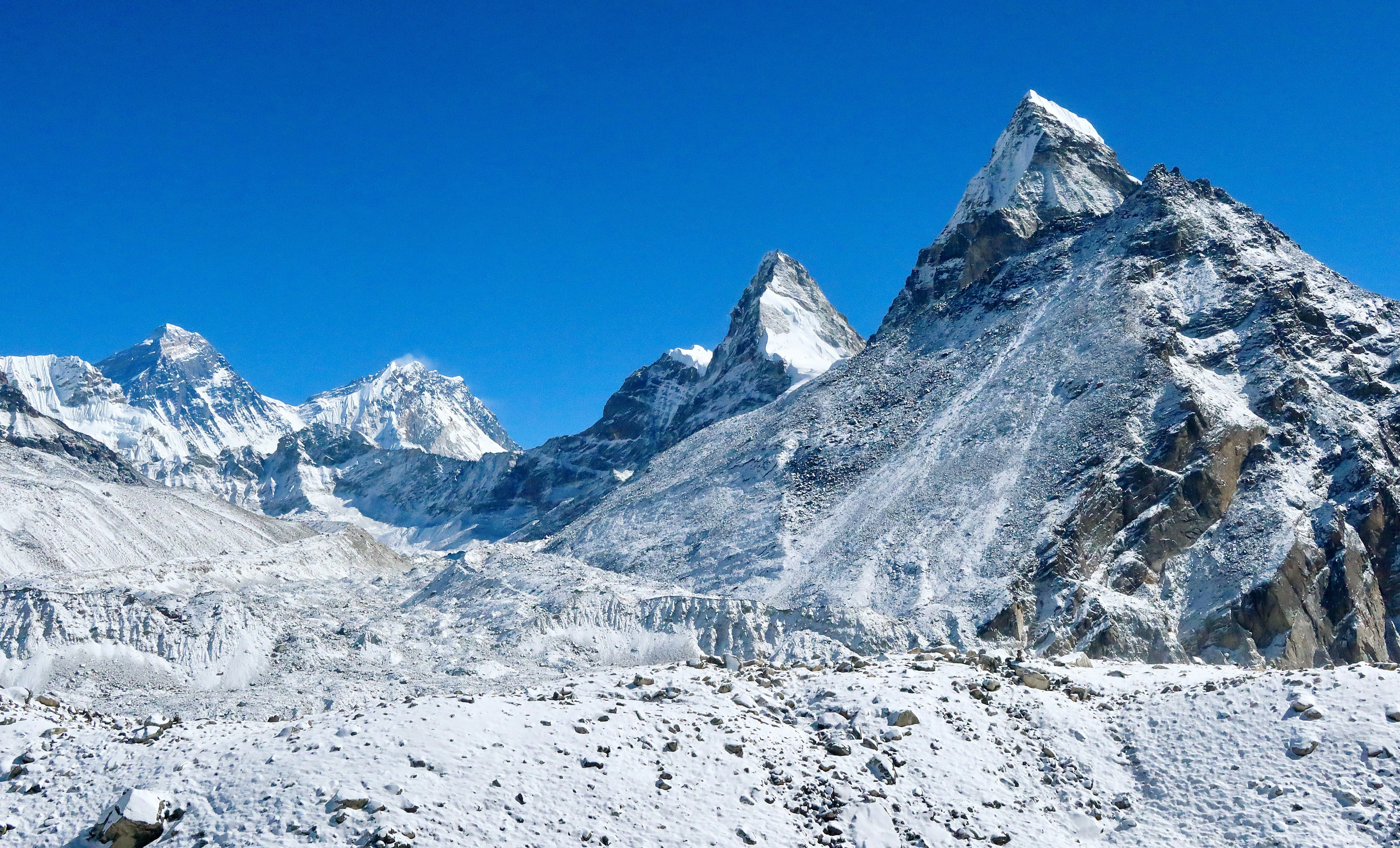
Abi (right) from northwest. Everest and Nuptse to distant left.

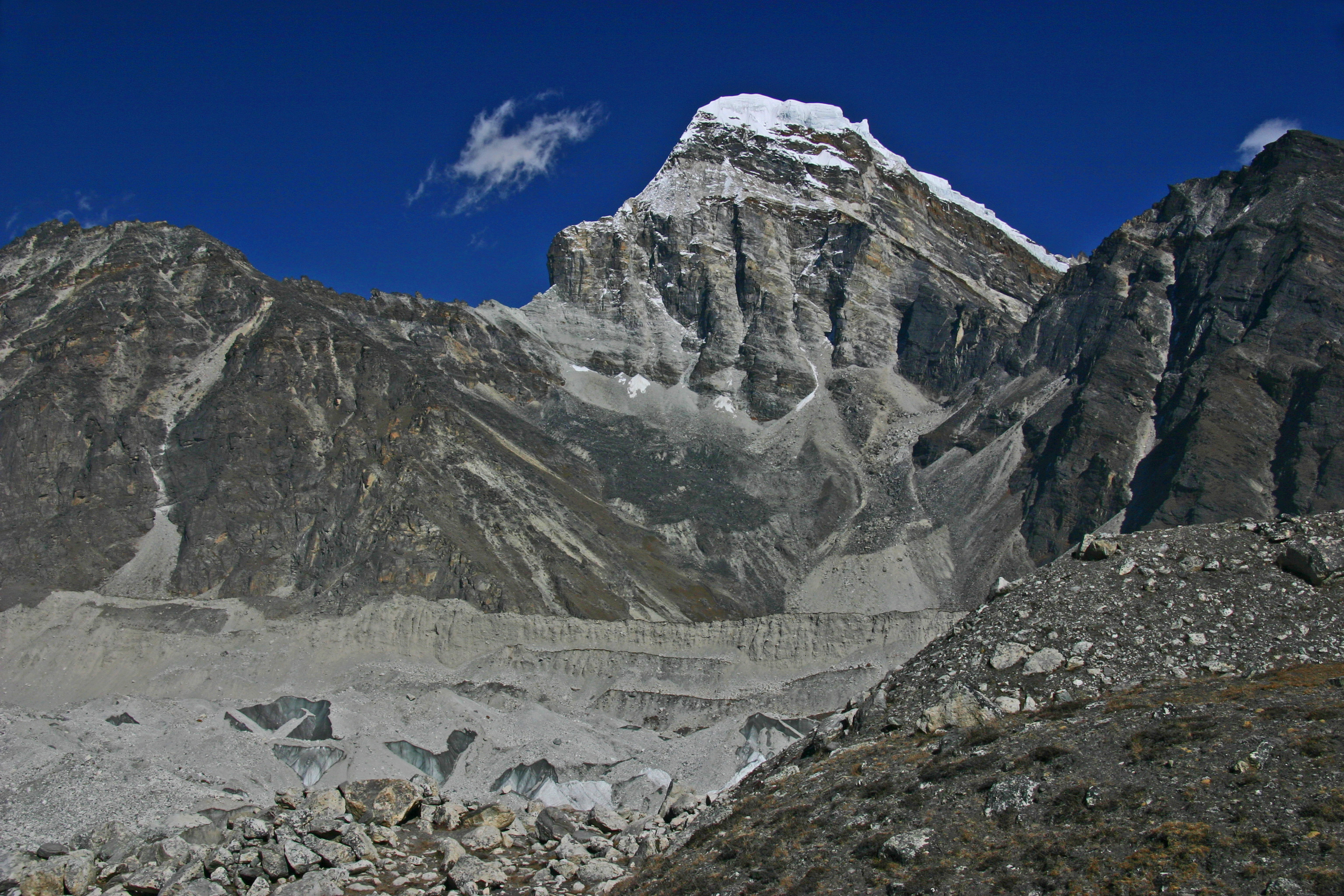
Southwest aspect

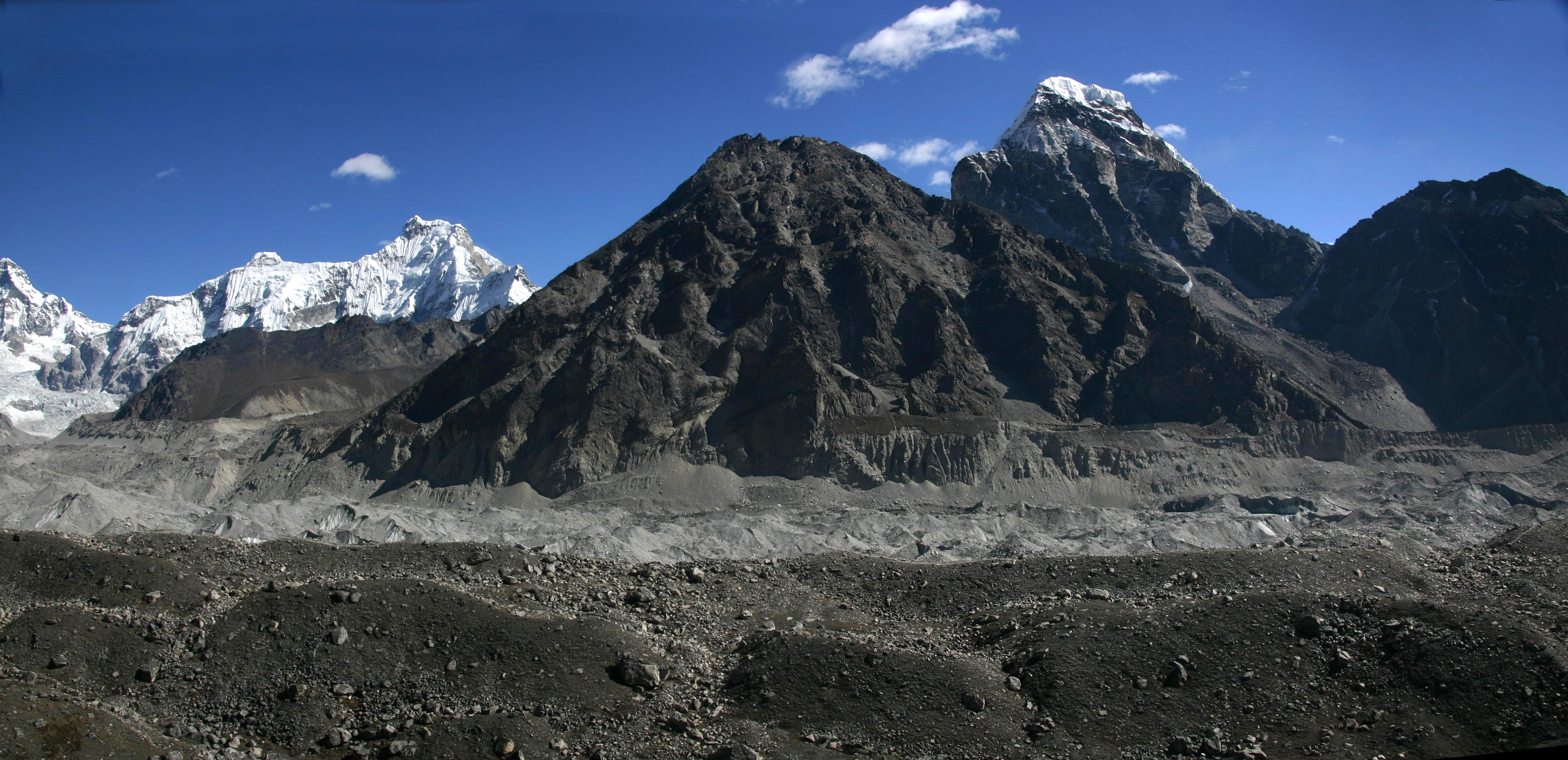
Abi to the right

== See also ==
- Geology of the Himalayas
