= Free the Delegates =

American political effort within the Republican Party in 2016

Free the Delegates was an American political effort within the Republican Party, formed in June 2016 by delegate and Rules Committee member Kendal Unruh to the 2016 Republican National Convention (July 18–21, 2016) with the goal of nominating a candidate other than Donald Trump, who won a plurality of primary votes and pledged delegates.

By June 19, hundreds of delegates to the Republican National Convention had begun raising funds and recruiting members in support of an effort to persuade the party convention rules committee to free delegates to vote as they individually wished, rather than according to the results of state caucuses and primaries.

== History ==
The movement was founded and launched in June by a delegate and RNC rules committee member, Kendal Unruh, with a nationwide conference call connecting 30 convention delegates in 15 states. Less than a week later, the group's second phone conference included over 1,000 delegates, about 400 of whom were pledged to the movement.

Free the Delegates movement was started by eight time National Delegate and former RNC Platform Committee member, Kendal Unruh of Castle Rock, Colorado, who teaches high school government at the Jim Elliot Christian School in Denver. Unruh was a 2016 Cruz delegate for Colorado to the convention and a member of the Rules Committee. Unruh was the sponsor of the "conscience clause" in the RNC rules committee. The amendment was to codify the legal right of the delegates to unbind from the candidate(s) who had been selected in the primaries. She was quickly joined by fellow Colorado delegate Regina Thomson. The movement was aided by Beau Correll of Winchester, Virginia, an attorney who was elected delegate to the Republican National Convention.

On July 11, Correll won a federal lawsuit in Correll v. Herring. The effect of the victory was to prevent state law from binding delegates.

== Organization ==
On June 24, 2016, Free The Delegates, a Super PAC, was officially formed by Beau Correll. Regina Thomson is the executive director and Kendal Unruh acted as the official spokesperson. The Free the Delegates PAC is an entirely different entity than the RNC Nomination challenge named Free the Delegates, founded and organized by Unruh.

Texas financier Chris Eckstrom, founder of Courageous Conservatives PAC, a PAC that supported the Ted Cruz presidential campaign, and political consultant Steve Lonegan of New Jersey ran an independent effort focused on denying Trump the Republican nomination.

== Republican support ==
Speaker of the House and Chairman of the 2016 Republican National Convention Paul Ryan appeared to give Free the Delegates tacit support when he appeared on NBC News' Meet the Press on June 19. During this appearance, he responded to a question about the group by saying, "It is not my job to tell delegates what to do, what not to do, or to weigh in on things like that... They write the rules. They make their decisions ... the last thing I'm going to do is weigh in and tell delegates what to do."

Wisconsin Governor Scott Walker gave support to Free the Delegates, telling the Associated Press, "I think historically, not just this year, delegates are and should be able to vote the way they see fit."

Former U.S. Senator Gordon J. Humphrey endorsed the efforts of Republican delegates to organize against Trump, saying he would work to encourage New England delegates to oppose Trump.

Arizona Senator and 2008 nominee John McCain told The Weekly Standard, "I think it's up to every delegate to make up their own minds."

== Responses ==
Columnist Eric Zorn argued that the group is the GOP's "last, best hope", arguing that while it may split the party, nominating Trump may also split it.

The Chicago Tribune's editorial board called for a mutiny of GOP delegates, writing, "The GOP has never nominated someone so plainly unprepared, unreliable and unfit."

== See also ==
- Beau Correll
- Correll v. Herring
