= American Bankruptcy Institute =

American organization

The American Bankruptcy Institute is an organization of over 13,000 bankruptcy and insolvency professionals, including attorneys, judges, law professors, accountants, investment bankers and turn-around specialists. It bills itself as the "largest multi-disciplinary, non-partisan organization dedicated to research and education on matters related to insolvency."

The ABI disseminates information by organizing conferences and publishing scholarly journals, including the American Bankruptcy Institute Law Review. It also holds panels bringing together multiple viewpoints on particular issues relating to insolvency. In addition, the ABI has established a commission to study and propose reforms to Chapter 11 law governing bankruptcies.
