= Jacki Schechner =

American television personality

Jacki Schechner is a former CNN and Current TV news correspondent and on-air personality for The Stephanie Miller Show. As of 2018, she was the Editor-in-Chief of The committee to Investigate Russia.

== Education ==
Schechner has a Master of Arts in Broadcast Journalism from the University of Miami and Bachelor of Arts in Diplomatic History from the University of Pennsylvania.
