= Olešná =

Olešná may refer to places:

== Czech Republic ==
- Olešná (Beroun District), a municipality and village in the Central Bohemian Region
- Olešná (Havlíčkův Brod District), a municipality and village in the Vysočina Region
- Olešná (Pelhřimov District), a municipality and village in the Vysočina Region
- Olešná (Písek District), a municipality and village in the South Bohemian Region
- Olešná (Rakovník District), a municipality and village in the Central Bohemian Region
- Nová Olešná, a municipality and village in the South Bohemian Region
- Olešná, a village and part of Blansko in the South Moravian Region
- Olešná, a village and part of Kozlov (Havlíčkův Brod District) in the Vysočina Region
- Olešná, a village and part of Načeradec in the Central Bohemian Region
- Olešná, a village and part of Němčovice in the Plzeň Region
- Olešná, a village and part of Nezvěstice in the Plzeň Region
- Olešná, a village and part of Nové Město na Moravě in the Vysočina Region
- Olešná, a village and part of Podlesí (Ústí nad Orlicí District) in the Pardubice Region
- Olešná, a village and part of Stráž (Tachov District) in the Plzeň Region

== Slovakia ==
- Olešná, Čadca, a municipality and village in the Žilina Region
