= Kozlovka =

Kozlovka may refer to the following places in Russia:

- Kozlovka, Amur Oblast
- Kozlovka, Belgorod Oblast
- Kozlovka, Pochepsky District, Bryansk Oblast
- Kozlovka, Kozlovsky District, Chuvash Republic
- Kozlovka, Vladimir Oblast
- Kozlovka, Nikolsky District, Vologda Oblast
- Kozlovka, Totemsky District, Vologda Oblast
- Kozlovka, Volgograd Oblast

== See also ==
- Kozlov (disambiguation)
- Kozlovsky (surname), a surname
