= Kozlov =

Kozlov may refer to:

== Places ==
=== Czech Republic ===
- Kozlov (Havlíčkův Brod District), a municipality and village in the Vysočina Region
- Kozlov (Jihlava District), a municipality and village in the Vysočina Region
- Kozlov (Olomouc District), a municipality and village in the Olomouc Region
- Kozlov (Žďár nad Sázavou District), a municipality and village in the Vysočina Region
- Kozlov, a village and part of Bochov in the Karlovy Vary Region
- Kozlov, a village and part of Bystřice nad Pernštejnem in the Vysočina Region
- Kozlov, a village and part of Česká Třebová in the Pardubice Region
- Kozlov, a village and part of Mladějov in the Hradec Králové Region
- Kozlov, a village and part of Střelské Hoštice in the South Bohemian Region

=== Russia ===
- Kozlov, former name of Michurinsk

=== Ukraine ===
- Kozlov, former name of Yevpatoria, Autonomous Republic of Crimea
- Kozlov, former name of Kozliv, Ternopil Oblast

== People ==
- Kozlov (surname)

== See also ==
- Kozloff (disambiguation), alternative spelling
- Kozlovsky (surname)
- Kozlovka (disambiguation)
- Kozlovice (disambiguation)
- Koslov, a surname
