= Kozlov (surname) =

Kozlov (Russian: Козло́в, Ukrainian: Козлов; feminine: Kozlova) is a Russian and Ukrainian surname. It is derived from the sobriquet козёл (kozyol = 'goat'). Notable people with the surname include:

== Arts ==
- Aleksei Kozlov (musician) (born 1935), Russian musician
- Evgenij Kozlov (born 1955), Russian artist
- Ivan Kozlov (1779–1840), Russian poet and translator
- Leonid Kozlov (born 1947), Russian-American ballet dancer
- Olga Kozlova (born 1986), Russian pianist
- Valentina Kozlova (born 1957), Russian-American ballerina
- Valeria Kozlova (born 1988), Russian musician
- Vasily Kozlov (sculptor) (1887–1940), Russian sculptor
- Vladimir Kozlov (director) (born 1956), Belarusian director and scriptwriter

== Sports ==
- Aleksandr Kozlov (footballer) (1993–2022), Russian footballer
- Aleksei Kozlov (footballer, born 1975), Russian footballer
- Aleksei Kozlov (footballer, born 1986), Russian footballer
- Aleksei Kozlov (footballer, born 1999), Russian footballer
- Alexei Kozlov (figure skater) (born 1979), Estonian figure skater
- Andrei Kozlov (footballer, born 1973), Russian football player and manager
- Andrei Kozlov (footballer, born 1989), Russian footballer
- Anna Kozlova (born 1972), American synchronized swimmer
- Artem Kozlov (footballer, born 1992), Ukrainian footballer
- Artem Kozlov (footballer, born 1997), Ukrainian footballer
- Dmitri Anatolyevich Kozlov (born 1984), Russian footballer
- Kateryna Kozlova (born 1994), Ukrainian tennis player
- Mariana Kozlova (born 1983), Ukrainian ice dancer
- Nicole Kozlova (born 2000), Ukrainian-Canadian footballer
- Nikolay Kozlov (born 1972), Russian water polo player
- Sergey Kozlov (footballer) (1960–2014), Russian football player and coach
- Serhiy Kozlov (born 1957), Ukrainian football coach
- Stefan Kozlov (born 1998), American tennis player
- Tatiana Kozlova (born 1986), Russian orienteering and ski-orienteering athlete
- Tatyana Kozlova (born 1983), Russian race walker
- Viktor Kozlov (born 1975), Russian ice hockey player
- Vladimir Kozlov, real name Oleg Prudius (born 1969), Ukrainian professional wrestler
- Vyacheslav Kozlov (born 1972), Russian ice hockey player

== Other ==
- Alexander Kozlov (born 1981), Russian politician
- Aleksei Aleksandrovich Kozlov (1831–1901), Russian philosopher
- Alexei Kozlov (businessman) (born 1974), Russian businessman
- Alexey Kozlov (intelligence officer) (1934–2015), Russian intelligence officer
- Andrey Kozlov (1965–2006), Russian banker
- Dmitri Kozlov (engineer) (1919–2009), Russian aerospace engineer
- Dmitry Timofeyevich Kozlov (1896–1967), Russian Soviet military commander
- Elizabeth Kozlova (1892–1975), Russian ornithologist
- Frol Kozlov (1908–1965), Russian politician
- Olimpiada Kozlova (1906–1986), Russian economist
- Pyotr Kozlov (1863–1935), Russian traveller and explorer
- Sergey Kozlov (politician) (born 1963), Ukrainian separatist leader
- Valery Vasilevich Kozlov (born 1950), Russian mathematician
- Vasily Kozlov (politician) (1903–1967), Belarusian partisan and politician
- Vladimir Kozlov (politician) (born 1960), Kazakh politician

== See also ==
- Tatjana Kozlova-Johannes (born 1977), Estonian-Russian composer
- Kozel (surname)
- Kozioł (surname)
- Kozlovsky (surname)
- Koslov
