= Podlesí =

Podlesí may refer to places in the Czech Republic:

- Podlesí (Příbram District), a municipality and village in the Central Bohemian Region
- Podlesí (Ústí nad Orlicí District), a municipality and village in the Pardubice Region
- Podlesí, a village and part of Brněnec in the Pardubice Region
- Podlesí, a village and part of Budišov nad Budišovkou in the Moravian-Silesian Region
- Podlesí, a village and part of Dolní Žandov in the Karlovy Vary Region
- Podlesí, a part of Havířov in the Moravian-Silesian Region
- Podlesí, a village and part of Holice in the Pardubice Region
- Podlesí, a village and part of Horní Police in the Liberec Region
- Podlesí, a village and part of Kašperské Hory in the Plzeň Region
- Podlesí, a village and part of Malá Morava in the Olomouc Region
- Podlesí, a village and part of Neustupov in the Central Bohemian Region
- Podlesí, a village and part of Sadov in the Karlovy Vary Region
- Podlesí, a village and part of Sněžné (Žďár nad Sázavou District) in the Vysočina Region
- Podlesí, a village and part of Staré Město pod Landštejnem in the South Bohemian Region
- Podlesí, a village and part of Světlá Hora in the Moravian-Silesian Region
- Podlesí, a part of Valašské Meziříčí in the Zlín Region

== See also ==
- Podlachia, a historical region named Podlesí in Czech
