= Kožlí =

Kožlí may refer to places in the Czech Republic:

- Kožlí (Havlíčkův Brod District), a municipality and village in the Vysočina Region
- Kožlí (Písek District), a municipality and village in the South Bohemian Region
- Kožlí, a village and part of Myštice in the South Bohemian Region
- Kožlí, a village and part of Neveklov in the Central Bohemian Region
- Kožlí u Čížové, a village and part of Předotice in the South Bohemian Region
