= Koslow =

Koslow is a surname. Notable people with the surname include:

- Caren Koslow (died 1992), American murder victim
- Howard Koslow (1924–2016), American illustrator
- Lauren Koslow (born 1953), American actress

== See also ==
- Koslov
