= Jeffrey L. Schmehl =

American judge (born 1955)

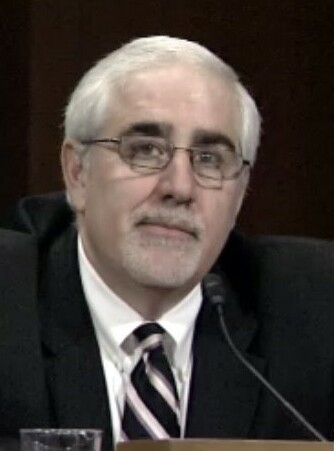
- Schmehl in 2013

Judge of the United States District Court for the Eastern District of Pennsylvania
- Incumbent
- Assumed office June 25, 2013
- Appointed by: Barack Obama
- Preceded by: Thomas M. Golden

Personal details
- Born: Jeffrey Louis Schmeh; November 1955 (age 70) Reading, Pennsylvania, U.S.
- Party: Republican
- Education: Dickinson College (BA); University of Toledo (JD)

Jeffrey Louis Schmehl (born November 1955) is a United States district judge of the United States District Court for the Eastern District of Pennsylvania.

== Biography ==
Schmehl received his Bachelor of Arts degree in 1977 from Dickinson College. He received his Juris Doctor in 1980 from the University of Toledo College of Law. He served as an Assistant Public Defender in Berks County, Pennsylvania, from 1980 to 1981. From 1981 to 1986, he served as an Assistant District Attorney in Berks County and also worked as a sole practitioner in West Reading. He joined the Wyomissing law firm of Rhoda, Stoudt & Bradley in 1986, becoming partner in 1988 and serving with that firm until 1997. During much of that time period he served as Berks County Solicitor. He became a judge of the Berks County Court of Common Pleas and served as President Judge of that court from 2008 to 2013.

=== Federal judicial service ===
On November 27, 2012, President Barack Obama nominated Schmehl to serve as a United States District Judge for the United States District Court for the Eastern District of Pennsylvania, to the seat vacated by Judge Thomas M. Golden, who died on July 31, 2010. He was nominated as part of a bipartisan package of nominees which included Nitza I. Quiñones Alejandro and L. Felipe Restrepo. On January 2, 2013, his nomination was returned to the President, due to the sine die adjournment of the Senate. On January 3, 2013, he was renominated to the same office. He received a hearing before the Senate Judiciary Committee on February 13, 2013. On March 7, 2013, his nomination was reported out of committee by a voice vote. The United States Senate confirmed him on June 13, 2013 by a 100–0 vote. He received his commission on June 25, 2013.

Legal offices
Preceded by Thomas M. Golden	Judge of the United States District Court for the Eastern District of Pennsylvania; 2013–present	Incumbent
