= Thomas Golden =

Thomas Golden may refer to:

- Thomas M. Golden (1947–2010), United States federal judge
- Thomas Golden Jr. (born 1971), American politician in the Massachusetts House of Representatives
- Thomas L. Golden (fl. 1858), American miner and prospector
