= Kozloff =

Kozloff, an alternative spelling of Kozlov, may refer to:

== People with the surname ==
- Eugene N. Kozloff (1920–2017), American marine biologist and botanist.
- Jake Kozloff (1901–1976), Russian-born American casino investor
- Joyce Kozloff (born 1942), American artist
- Lloyd M. Kozloff (1923–2012), American microbiologist and virologist
- Max Kozloff (1933–2025), American art historian, art critic and photographer
- Nikolas Kozloff (born 1969), American academic and journalist

== Other ==
- Kozloff Stoudt, American law firm based in Pennsylvania
