= Thomas I. Vanaskie =

American judge (born 1953)

Thomas Vanaskie
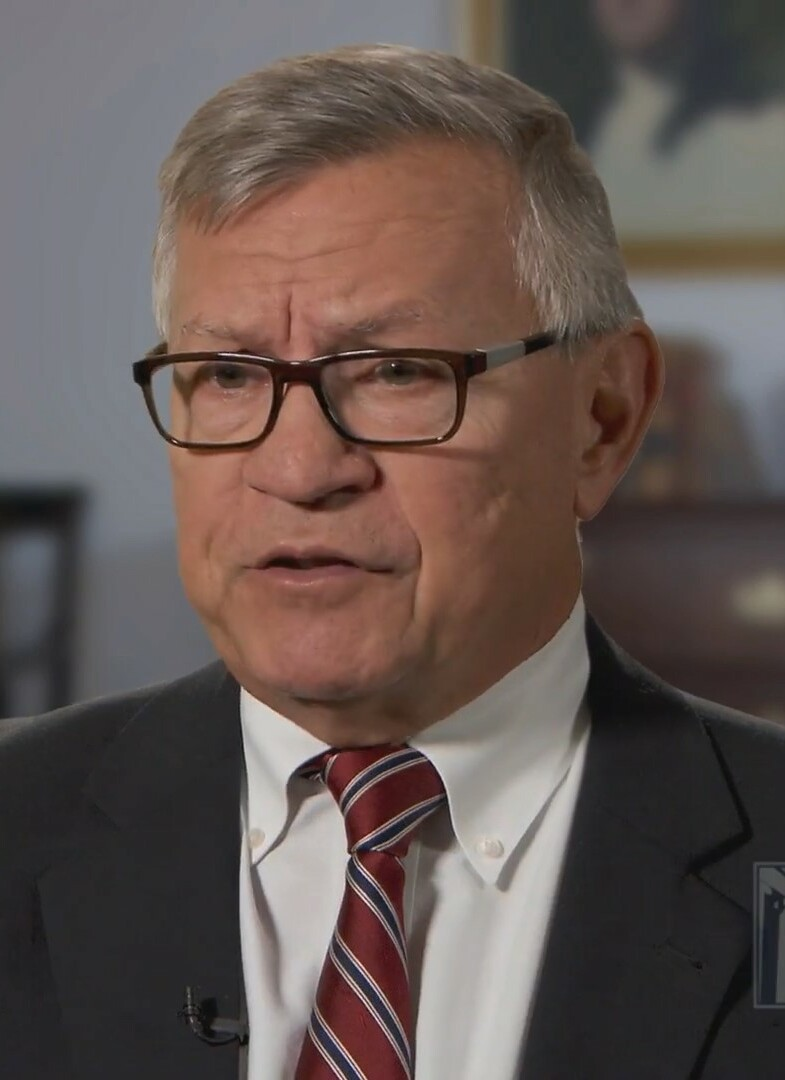
- Vanaskie in 2017

Senior Judge of the United States Court of Appeals for the Third Circuit
- In office November 30, 2018 – January 2, 2019

Judge of the United States Court of Appeals for the Third Circuit
- In office April 26, 2010 – November 30, 2018
- Appointed by: Barack Obama
- Preceded by: Franklin Van Antwerpen
- Succeeded by: Peter J. Phipps

Chief Judge of the United States District Court for the Middle District of Pennsylvania
- In office 1999–2006
- Preceded by: Sylvia Rambo
- Succeeded by: Yvette Kane

Judge of the United States District Court for the Middle District of Pennsylvania
- In office February 10, 1994 – April 28, 2010
- Appointed by: Bill Clinton
- Preceded by: Seat established
- Succeeded by: Matthew W. Brann

Personal details
- Born: Thomas Ignatius Vanaskie; November 11, 1953 (age 72) Shamokin, Pennsylvania, U.S.
- Education: Lycoming College (BA); Dickinson School of Law (JD)

Thomas Ignatius Vanaskie (born November 11, 1953) is a former United States circuit judge of the United States Court of Appeals for the Third Circuit and former judge of the United States District Court for the Middle District of Pennsylvania.

== Early life and education ==
Vanaskie was born in Shamokin, Pennsylvania. He received a Bachelor of Arts degree from Lycoming College in 1975 and earned a Juris Doctor from Dickinson School of Law in 1978. He was a law clerk for Judge William Joseph Nealon Jr. of the United States District Court for the Middle District of Pennsylvania from 1978 to 1980.

== Career ==
Vanaskie worked in private legal practice in Scranton, Pennsylvania from 1980 to 1994.

=== District court service ===
On November 17, 1993, President Bill Clinton nominated Vanaskie to a seat on the United States District Court for the Middle District of Pennsylvania that was created by 104 Stat. 5089. Vanaskie was confirmed by the United States Senate on February 10, 1994, and received his commission on February 11, 1994. Vanaskie served as chief judge from 1999 to 2006. His service terminated on April 28, 2010, after being elevated to the court of appeals.

=== Court of appeals service ===
On August 6, 2009, President Barack Obama nominated Vanaskie to a seat on the United States Court of Appeals for the Third Circuit that was created when Judge Franklin Stuart Van Antwerpen assumed senior status in 2006. On November 5, 2009, Vanaskie's nomination was considered by the Senate Judiciary Committee. He was reported to the full Senate by the committee on December 3, 2009. Senate Majority Leader Harry Reid filed for cloture on Vanaskie's nomination on April 15, 2010. The Senate confirmed Vanaskie on April 21, 2010, by a 77–20 vote. He received his judicial commission on April 26, 2010. Vanaskie assumed senior status on November 30, 2018. He retired from active service on January 2, 2019.

Legal offices
| New seat | Judge of the United States District Court for the Middle District of Pennsylvania; 1994–2010 | Succeeded by Matthew W. Brann |
| Preceded by Sylvia Rambo | Chief Judge of the United States District Court for the Middle District of Pennsylvania; 1999–2006 | Succeeded by Yvette Kane |
| Preceded by Franklin Van Antwerpen | Judge of the United States Court of Appeals for the Third Circuit; 2010–2018 | Succeeded by Peter J. Phipps |
