= Christy C. Wiegand =

American judge (born 1975)

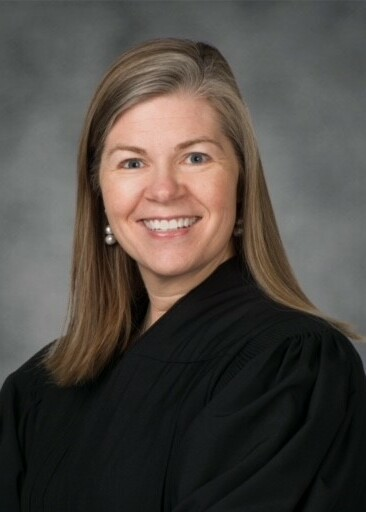

Judge of the United States District Court for the Western District of Pennsylvania
- Incumbent
- Assumed office September 11, 2020
- Appointed by: Donald Trump
- Preceded by: Peter J. Phipps

Personal details
- Born: 1975 (age 50–51) Pittsburgh, Pennsylvania, U.S.
- Education: Princeton University (BA); Cornell University (JD)

Christy Criswell Wiegand (born 1975) is a United States district judge of the United States District Court for the Western District of Pennsylvania.

== Education ==
Wiegand earned her Bachelor of Arts, cum laude, from Princeton University in 1997, and her Juris Doctor, cum laude, from Cornell Law School in 2000, where she served as an articles editor of the Cornell Law Review.

== Legal career ==
Upon graduating from law school, Wiegand became an associate at Arnold & Porter in Washington, D.C., where her practice focused on antitrust matters. She later served as a law clerk to Judge D. Brooks Smith of the United States Court of Appeals for the Third Circuit. Wiegand then became an assistant United States attorney for the Western District of Pennsylvania. Wiegand previously served as the deputy chief of the Office's Civil Division, and thereafter served in the Criminal Division's Major Crimes Unit, where she prosecuted a variety of crimes, including large-scale drug trafficking, child exploitation, illegal firearms, and fraud.

== Federal judicial service ==
On February 5, 2020, President Donald Trump announced his intent to nominate Wiegand to serve as a United States district judge of the United States District Court for the Western District of Pennsylvania. On February 12, 2020, her nomination was sent to the Senate. President Trump nominated Wiegand to the seat vacated by Judge Peter J. Phipps, who was elevated to the United States Court of Appeals for the Third Circuit on July 22, 2019. On June 17, 2020, a hearing on her nomination was held before the Senate Judiciary Committee. On July 23, 2020, her nomination was reported out of committee by a 17–5 vote. On September 9, 2020, the United States Senate invoked cloture on her nomination by an 80–16 vote. Her nomination was confirmed later that day by an 82–14 vote. She received her judicial commission on September 11, 2020.

Legal offices
Preceded by Peter J. Phipps	Judge of the United States District Court for the Western District of Pennsylvania; 2020–present	Incumbent
