= State University of Management =

Public university in Moscow, Russia

- Государственный университет управления
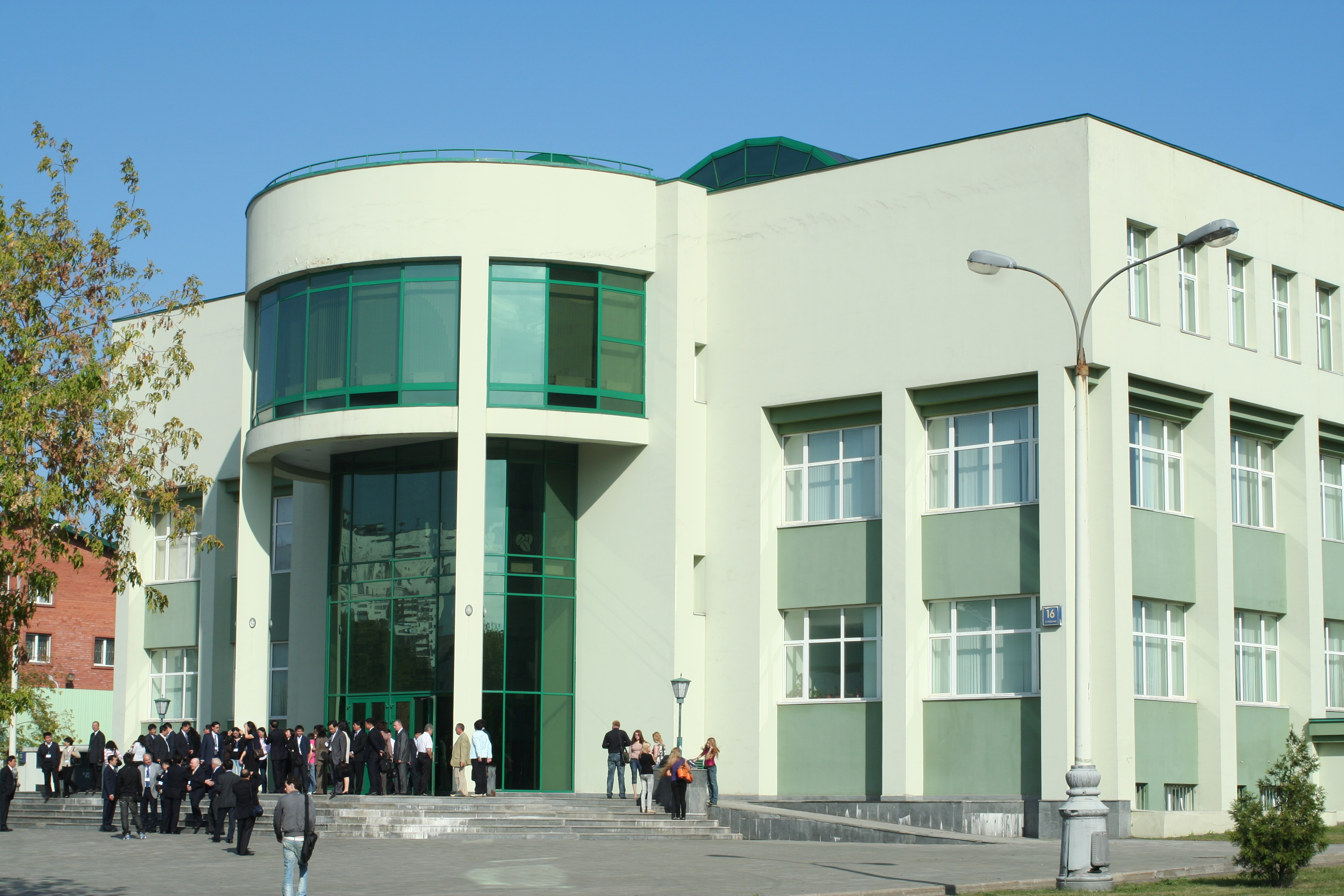
- Established: 1919
- Rector: Ivan Lobanov
- Academic staff: 1,116
- Undergraduates: 17,000
- Location: Moscow, Russia; 55.714698°N 37.814105°E
- Website: guu.ru

University rankings

Regional – Overall
- QS Emerging Europe and Central Asia: 401-450 (2022)

The State University of Management (SUM, Russian: Государственный университет управления (ГУУ)) is a public university in Moscow, Russia. It was founded in 1919. Its rector is Ivan Vasilyevich Lobanov. There are more than 250 professors and 12 academics and members of the Russian Academy of Sciences working at the university.

The university is the pioneer of management education in Russia.

== History ==
In 1885, the Alexander Commercial School of the Moscow Exchange Society was founded. Together with the Nikolayev Women's Commercial School and the Trading School named after Emperor Nicholas II in 1918, it laid the foundation for a new educational institution - the Moscow Industrial and Economic Practical College.

On April 30, 1919, by the decision of the People's Commissariat of Trade and Industry of the RSFSR, the Moscow Industrial and Economic College was transformed into the Moscow Industrial and Economic Practical Institute. The university was designed to train economists for industry and consumer cooperation, financiers, and economics and labor organization specialists.

On July 23, 1930, by a decree of the Central Executive Committee and the Council of People's Commissars of the Soviet Union, the Moscow Industrial and Economic Practical Institute was transformed into the Moscow Engineering and Economic Institute (MIEI). The institute's main task was training engineers-economists of a wide profile for the most important sectors of the national economy: mechanical engineering, chemistry, metallurgy, energy, construction, transport, urban economy, etc.

In 1950, the Moscow Engineering and Economic Institute was headed by Olimpiada Kozlova, with whose efforts the construction of a new complex of buildings of the Moscow Institute of Power Engineering on Ryazansky Prospekt began. On December 19, 1969, by decree of the Presidium of the Supreme Soviet of the USSR, MIEI was awarded the Order of the Red Banner of Labor. On March 28, 1975, by order of the Ministry of Higher and Secondary Specialized Education of the USSR, the Moscow Institute of Engineering and Economics was renamed the Moscow Institute of Management named after Sergo Ordzhonikidze.

Dormitory No. 2 was commissioned in 1976.

In 1986, A. G. Porshnev was elected rector of the Moscow Institute of Management named after Sergo Ordzhonikidze.

On February 5, 1991, by a decree of the Council of Ministers of the Soviet Union, the Moscow Institute of Management was transformed into the State Academy of Management. The Academy initiated the opening of new areas of management education in the country.

In 1997, a branch of the State University of Management was opened in Obninsk, the only one to date.

On August 8, 1998, by order of the Ministry of General and Vocational Education of the Russian Federation, based on state certification and accreditation results, the State Academy of Management received the status of a university. It was renamed the State University of Management.

In 2006, Alexey Lyalin was elected rector of the SUM. On February 7, 2011, by order of the Minister of Education Andrei Fursenko dated February 7, 2011 No. 15-21 / 25, Lyalin was dismissed from the post of rector.

By order of the Minister of Education dated July 11, 2011 No. 15-21/139, Viktor Anatolyevich Kozbanenko was approved as the rector of the SUM. Per the order of the Ministry of Education and Science of the Russian Federation No. 12-07-03 / 39 dated March 11, 2013, V. A. Kozbanenko was dismissed from his position.

Since March 12, 2013, per the order of the Ministry of Education and Science of the Russian Federation No. 12-07-03 / 40, the duties of the rector of the State University of Management have been assigned to V. V. Godin.

Since May 13, 2015, the position of Acting Rector of the SUM, per the order of the Ministry of Education and Science of the Russian Federation, was replaced by Doctor of Economics, Professor Vladimir Stroyev.

By order of the Ministry of Education and Science of the Russian Federation No. 398 dated April 12, 2016, the State University of Management was attached to the Moscow State Law Academy. On December 7, 2016, an extraordinary meeting of the Academic Council was held at the State University of Management. As a result, it was decided to file a petition with the Ministry of Education and Science of the Russian Federation to cancel the order to reorganize the university. On July 31, 2017, the Minister of Education and Science of Russia, Olga Vasilyeva, signed the Order to cancel the reorganization of the State University of Management and the Moscow State Law University named after O. E. Kutafin into a single university. According to the Order of the Ministry of Education and Science of the Russian Federation No. 12-07-03 / 127 dated August 3, 2017, Ivan Vasilievich Lobanov was appointed acting rector of the State University of Management from August 8, 2017.

== Structure ==
- Institute of Management in the industry, energy and construction
- Institute of Transport Management, in the tourism industry and international business
- Institute of Public Administration and Law
- Institute of Information Systems Management
- Institute of Economic Management Innovation
- Institute of financial management and tax administration
- Institute of Management and Entrepreneurship in the social sphere
- Institute of Marketing
- Institute of Open Education
- Institute of Continuing Education employees in the public sector and business
- Faculty Master training
- Institute training of the teaching and research staff
- Branch of the State University of Management in Obninsk
- Center of retraining and advanced training of the teaching staff SUM
- Graduate School of Business

== Notable alumni ==
- Mikhail Zurabov (b. 1953), a Russian politician.
- Sergei Glazyev (b. 1961), a Russian politician.
- Almazbek Atambaev (b. 1956), the President of Kyrgyzstan.
- Yelena Baturina (b. 1963), a Russian entrepreneur, one of the richest women in the world.
- Dmitry Patrushev (1999) - Minister of agriculture of the Russian Federation
- Vladimir Faltsman - (b. 1932), a Russian professor and economist
