= Kozlovice =

Kozlovice may refer to places in the Czech Republic:

- Kozlovice (Frýdek-Místek District), a municipality and village in the Moravian-Silesian Region
- Kozlovice (Plzeň-South District), a municipality and village in the Plzeň Region
- Kozlovice, a village and part of Záluží (Litoměřice District) in the Ústí nad Labem Region
- Přerov IV-Kozlovice, a village and part of Přerov in the Olomouc Region
