= Terrence F. McVerry =

American judge (1943–2021)

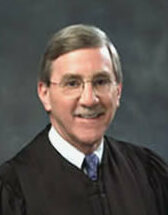

Senior Judge of the United States District Court for the Western District of Pennsylvania
- In office September 30, 2013 – March 8, 2021

Judge of the United States District Court for the Western District of Pennsylvania
- In office September 4, 2002 – September 30, 2013
- Appointed by: George W. Bush
- Preceded by: Donald Emil Ziegler
- Succeeded by: Peter J. Phipps

Member of the Pennsylvania House of Representatives from the 42nd district
- In office January 2, 1979 – November 30, 1990
- Preceded by: H. Sheldon Parker
- Succeeded by: Gregory Fajt

Personal details
- Born: September 16, 1943 Pittsburgh, Pennsylvania
- Died: March 8, 2021 (aged 77) Lebanon, Pennsylvania
- Education: Duquesne University (BA); Duquesne University School of Law (JD)

Terrence Francis McVerry (September 16, 1943 – March 8, 2021) was a United States district judge of the United States District Court for the Western District of Pennsylvania.

== Education and career ==
Born in Pittsburgh, Pennsylvania, McVerry received a Bachelor of Arts degree from Duquesne University in 1965 and a Juris Doctor from Duquesne University School of Law in 1968. He was in private practice in Pittsburgh, from 1966 to 1998. He was an Assistant district attorney of District Attorney of Allegheny County, Pennsylvania, from 1969 to 1973. In 1978, McVerry was elected to the Pennsylvania House of Representatives and represented a number of south hills communities in the General Assembly for six terms through 1990.

He was a judge on the Court of Common Pleas of Allegheny County, Pennsylvania from 1998 to 2000. He was a Solicitor/Director, Allegheny County Law Department, Pennsylvania from 2000 to 2002. He was a Solicitor/General counsel, Community College of Allegheny County, Pennsylvania from 2000 to 2002.

== District court service ==
McVerry was a senior United States District Judge of the United States District Court for the Western District of Pennsylvania. McVerry was nominated by President George W. Bush on January 23, 2002, to a seat vacated by Donald Emil Ziegler. He was confirmed by the United States Senate on September 3, 2002, and received his commission on September 4, 2002. He took senior status on September 30, 2013, and died on March 8, 2021.

== Sources ==
Legal offices
Preceded by Donald Emil Ziegler	Judge of the United States District Court for the Western District of Pennsylvania; 2002–2013	Succeeded by Peter J. Phipps
