= Peter J. Phipps =

American judge (born 1973)

Peter Phipps
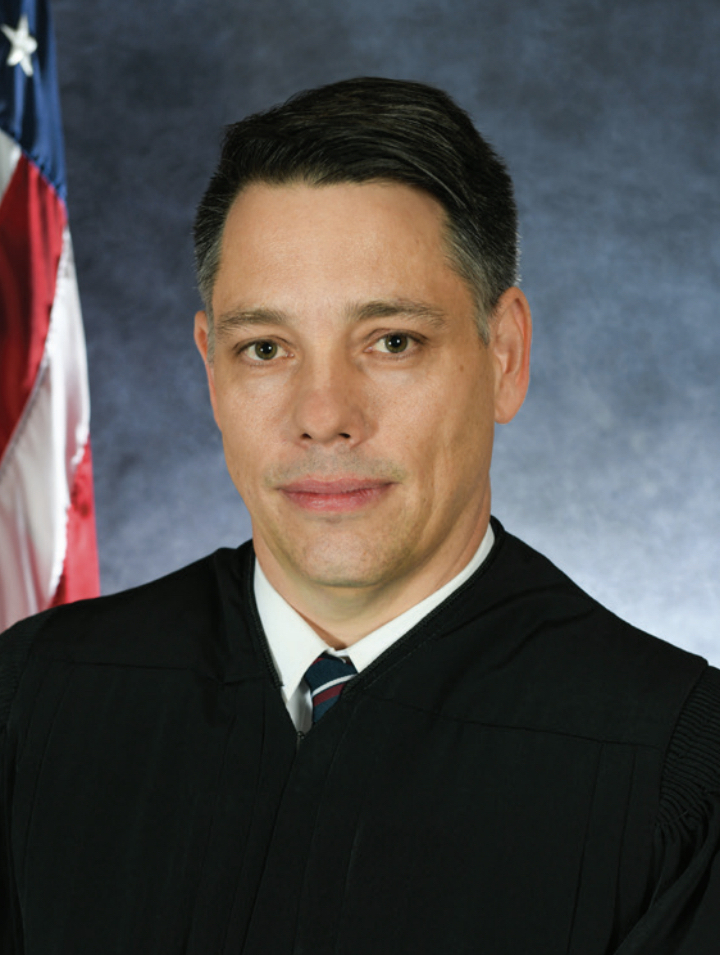
- Official portrait, 2019

Judge of the United States Court of Appeals for the Third Circuit
- Incumbent
- Assumed office July 17, 2019
- Appointed by: Donald Trump
- Preceded by: Thomas I. Vanaskie

Judge of the United States District Court for the Western District of Pennsylvania
- In office October 17, 2018 – July 22, 2019
- Appointed by: Donald Trump
- Preceded by: Terrence F. McVerry
- Succeeded by: Christy C. Wiegand

Personal details
- Born: Peter Joseph Phipps; April 8, 1973 (age 53) Dyess Air Force Base, Texas, U.S.
- Party: Republican
- Education: University of Dayton (BA, BS); Stanford University (JD)

Peter Joseph Phipps (born April 8, 1973) is a United States circuit judge of the United States Court of Appeals for the Third Circuit.

== Biography ==
Phipps earned both a Bachelor of Science in physics and a Bachelor of Arts in history from the University of Dayton, summa cum laude, and earned his Juris Doctor from Stanford Law School, where he served as the managing editor of the Stanford Law & Policy Review. He also served as a law clerk to Judge R. Guy Cole Jr. of the United States Court of Appeals for the Sixth Circuit.

Earlier in his career, Phipps spent three years as an associate at Jones Day, where his practice focused on civil litigation.

Before becoming a judge, Phipps served as senior trial counsel in the Federal Programs Branch of the United States Department of Justice Civil Division. During his 14-year tenure at the Justice Department, Phipps litigated some of the most significant cases implicating the interests of the United States and received numerous awards and commendations, including the Attorney General's Distinguished Service Award.

== Federal judicial service ==
=== District Court service ===
On February 12, 2018, President Donald Trump announced his intent to nominate Phipps to a seat on the United States District Court for the Western District of Pennsylvania. On February 15, 2018, his nomination was sent to the United States Senate. President Trump nominated Phipps to the seat vacated by Terrence F. McVerry, who assumed senior status on September 30, 2013. On April 25, 2018, a hearing on his nomination was held before the Senate Judiciary Committee. On May 24, 2018, his nomination was reported out of committee by a voice vote. On October 11, 2018, his nomination was confirmed by voice vote. He received his judicial commission on October 17, 2018, and was sworn in on October 23, 2018. His service as a district court judge ended on July 22, 2019 when he was elevated to the court of appeals.

=== Court of Appeals service ===
On May 3, 2019, President Trump announced his intent to nominate Phipps to serve as a United States Circuit Judge of the United States Court of Appeals for the Third Circuit. On May 13, 2019, his nomination was sent to the Senate. He has been nominated to the seat vacated by Thomas I. Vanaskie, who assumed senior status on November 30, 2018. On June 5, 2019, a hearing on his nomination was held before the Senate Judiciary Committee. On June 27, 2019, his nomination was reported out of committee by a 12–10 vote. On July 15, 2019, the Senate invoked cloture on his nomination by a 53–40 vote. On July 16, 2019, his nomination was confirmed by a 56–40 vote. He received his judicial commission on July 17, 2019.

== See also ==
- Donald Trump Supreme Court candidates

Legal offices
| Preceded by Terrence F. McVerry | Judge of the United States District Court for the Western District of Pennsylvania; 2018–2019 | Succeeded by Christy C. Wiegand |
| Preceded by Thomas I. Vanaskie | Judge of the United States Court of Appeals for the Third Circuit; 2019–present | Incumbent |
