= H. Sheldon Parker =

American politician

H. Sheldon Parker, Jr.

Member of the Pennsylvania House of Representatives from the 42nd district
- In office January 7, 1969 – November 30, 1978
- Preceded by: District created
- Succeeded by: Terrence McVerry

Member of the Pennsylvania House of Representatives from the Allegheny County district
- In office January 2, 1967 – November 30, 1968

Personal details
- Born: April 14, 1938 (age 88) Pittsburgh, Pennsylvania
- Party: Republican

H. Sheldon Parker, Jr. (born April 14, 1938) is a former Republican member of the Pennsylvania House of Representatives.
