= Franklin Van Antwerpen =

American judge (1941– 2016)

Franklin S. Van Antwerpen

Senior Judge of the United States Court of Appeals for the Third Circuit
- In office October 23, 2006 – July 25, 2016

Judge of the United States Court of Appeals for the Third Circuit
- In office May 24, 2004 – October 23, 2006
- Appointed by: George W. Bush
- Preceded by: Edward R. Becker
- Succeeded by: Thomas I. Vanaskie

Judge of the United States District Court for the Eastern District of Pennsylvania
- In office December 9, 1987 – June 1, 2004
- Appointed by: Ronald Reagan
- Preceded by: Alfred Leopold Luongo
- Succeeded by: Thomas M. Golden

Personal details
- Born: Franklin Stuart Van Antwerpen; October 23, 1941 Passaic, New Jersey, U.S.
- Died: July 25, 2016 (aged 74) Palmer Township, Pennsylvania, U.S.
- Education: University of Maine (BS); Temple University (JD)

Franklin Stuart Van Antwerpen (October 23, 1941 – July 25, 2016) was a United States circuit judge of the United States Court of Appeals for the Third Circuit. He assumed senior status on October 23, 2006, on his 65th birthday, serving in that status until his death.

== Early life and education ==
Born in Passaic, New Jersey, he attended Newark Academy, graduating in 1960. Van Antwerpen studied at the University of Maine, receiving a Bachelor of Science degree. He earned a Juris Doctor at the Temple University Beasley School of Law.

== Career ==
Van Antwerpen served as contracts counsel for the Hazeltine Corporation in New York City from 1967 to 1970. He was chief counsel for the Northampton County Legal Aid Society in Easton, Pennsylvania from 1970 to 1971. He was in private practice of law in Easton from 1971 to 1979. He was a judge of the Northampton County Court of Common Pleas in Easton from 1979 to 1987.

=== Federal judicial service ===
Van Antwerpen was nominated by President Ronald Reagan on September 11, 1987, to a seat on the United States District Court for the Eastern District of Pennsylvania vacated by Judge Alfred Leopold Luongo. He was confirmed by the United States Senate on December 8, 1987, and received his commission on December 9, 1987. His service was terminated on June 1, 2004, due to elevation to the court of appeals.

On September 11, 1991, President George H. W. Bush nominated Van Antwerpen to the United States Court of Appeals for the Third Circuit. However, Van Antwerpen's nomination languished in the Senate Judiciary Committee, and it expired with the end of Bush's presidency. President Bill Clinton chose not to renominate Van Antwerpen to the Third Circuit.

Van Antwerpen was nominated by President George W. Bush on November 21, 2003, to a seat on the United States Court of Appeals for the Third Circuit vacated by Judge Edward R. Becker. He was confirmed by the Senate on May 20, 2004 by a 96–0 vote. He received his commission on May 24, 2004. "It's happened. We did it. And wow!" Van Antwerpen told a local newspaper after his confirmation vote.

He assumed senior status on October 23, 2006, serving in that status until his death on July 25, 2016, in Palmer Township, Pennsylvania.

== See also ==
- George H.W. Bush judicial appointment controversies

Legal offices
Preceded by Alfred Leopold Luongo	Judge of the United States District Court for the Eastern District of Pennsylvania; 1987–2004	Succeeded by Thomas M. Golden
Preceded by Edward R. Becker	Judge of the United States Court of Appeals for the Third Circuit; 2004–2006	Succeeded by Thomas I. Vanaskie
