= Matthew W. Brann =

American judge (born 1965)

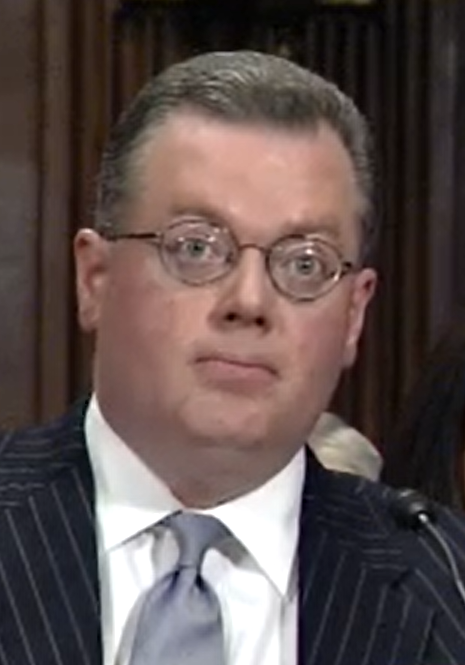
- Brann in June 2012

Chief Judge of the United States District Court for the Middle District of Pennsylvania
- Incumbent
- Assumed office August 1, 2021
- Preceded by: John E. Jones III

Judge of the United States District Court for the Middle District of Pennsylvania
- Incumbent
- Assumed office December 27, 2012
- Appointed by: Barack Obama
- Preceded by: Thomas I. Vanaskie

Personal details
- Born: Matthew William Brann; July 25, 1965 (age 60) Elmira, New York, U.S.
- Party: Republican
- Education: University of Notre Dame (BA); Dickinson School of Law (JD)

Matthew William Brann (born July 25, 1965) is the chief United States district judge of the United States District Court for the Middle District of Pennsylvania.

== Early life and education ==
Brann was born in Elmira, New York, on July 25, 1965. He received his Bachelor of Arts degree in 1987 from the University of Notre Dame. He received his Juris Doctor in 1990 from Penn State Dickinson Law at Pennsylvania State University.

== Career ==
From 1990 to 1991, Brann served as a law clerk with the Court of Common Pleas in Bradford County, Pennsylvania. He became an associate at Brann, Williams, Caldwell & Sheetz in 1991 and a partner at that firm in 1995. He also spent years as a Republican Party official in Pennsylvania and was active in the Federalist Society and National Rifle Association. In private practice, he focused on tort, contract, commercial, and real estate litigation.

=== Federal judicial service ===
On May 17, 2012, President Barack Obama nominated Brann to be a United States District Judge for the United States District Court for the Middle District of Pennsylvania, to the seat vacated by Judge Thomas I. Vanaskie, who was elevated to the United States Court of Appeals for the Third Circuit in 2010. Senator Pat Toomey recommended Brann as part of a paired nomination with a recommendation by Senator Bob Casey Jr. The Senate Judiciary Committee held a hearing on his nomination on June 27, 2012, and reported it to the floor on July 19. The Senate confirmed his nomination by unanimous consent on December 21. Brann received his commission on December 27. He entered on duty as a United States District Judge on January 17, 2013. He sits at the United States Courthouse and Federal Building in Williamsport, Pennsylvania.

In September 2019, a three-judge panel of the Third Circuit Court of Appeals admonished Brann for making conclusions a jury should address and for glossing over serious disputes regarding the facts of a case.

=== Notable rulings ===
Brann presided over the case Donald J. Trump for President v. Boockvar, in which the Donald Trump 2020 presidential campaign sought to block the certification of the nearly seven million presidential election votes cast in Pennsylvania. This case was one of the lawsuits challenging results from states Joe Biden won in that election. During an appearance before the court, Trump's lead attorney, Rudy Giuliani, said there was "widespread, nationwide voter fraud", but under questioning by Brann, Giuliani said, "This is not a fraud case."

Brann dismissed the case with prejudice on November 21, 2020, citing "strained legal arguments without merit and speculative accusations" that were "unsupported by evidence". He also ruled that an evidentiary hearing was not needed. He said the Trump team's argument "like Frankenstein's Monster, has been haphazardly stitched together from two distinct theories in an attempt to avoid controlling precedent" and characterized the requested remedy to disqualify the votes as "unhinged from the underlying right being asserted".

The Trump campaign appealed to the United States Court of Appeals for the Third Circuit, where a three-judge panel ruled on November 27 that the District Court under Brann had been correct in preventing the Trump campaign from amending its complaint a second time. The panel also praised the District Court under Brann, saying it had demonstrated "fast, fair, patient handling of this demanding litigation".

On August 21, 2025, Brann ruled in a 77-page order that President Donald Trump had unlawfully extended Alina Habba's appointment as United States Attorney for New Jersey. Habba had initially held the position under a 120-day interim appointment, but was never confirmed by the U.S. Senate. Brann wrote, "Faced with the question of whether Ms. Habba is lawfully performing the functions and duties of the office of the United States Attorney for the District of New Jersey, I conclude that she is not".

On March 9, 2026, Brann ruled that a triumvirate of attorneys was unconstitutionally appointed to lead the office of the U.S. Attorney for New Jersey.

Legal offices
Preceded by Thomas I. Vanaskie	Judge of the United States District Court for the Middle District of Pennsylvania; 2012–present	Incumbent
Preceded by John E. Jones III	Chief Judge of the United States District Court for the Middle District of Pennsylvania; 2021–present	Incumbent
