= Vladimir Faltsman =

Russian professor and economist (born 1932)

- Владимир Константинович Фальцман
- Born: 29 December 1932 (age 93); Tabriz, Iran
- Education: Moscow State University of Management
- Scientific career
- Fields: Economics
- Workplaces: Russian-German Graduate School of National Economic Management

Vladimir Konstantinovich Faltsman (Russian: Влади́мир Константи́нович Фа́льцман) (born 29 December 1932) is a Russian professor and economist, known for his books evaluating the study of Economics. He is also currently the dean and a professor in the "Russian-German Graduate School of National Economic Management" in Moscow.

== Biography ==
Vladimir Faltsman was born on 29 December 1932 in Tabriz, Iran. He attended school in Moscow, and in 1956 graduated from the Moscow State University of Management.

From 1957 to 1982, he worked at the plant "Hammer and Sickle" as Production Manager and Research Gosplan ekonomikoy engineering and metallurgy. Additionally, from 1972 to 1988, he was head of the sector in the Central Economic-Mathematics Institute RAN.

From 1988 up to 1993, Vladimir taught at the Institute of Economics, Moscow State University as the professor and the head of the research area "National Wealth."

From 1993 onwards Vladimir created the Russian-German Graduate School of National Economic Management. He worked at the institute structural and investment policy Microdin, as the director of 'Association of investment, innovation and development.

Additionally, as a professor, he taught "Economics and Management" in the ANE.

He has two sons and one daughter.

== Notable scientific publications ==
The books below were written in Russian language.

"Principles of Microeconomics" (1999)
"Evaluation of investment projects and enterprises" (1999)
"Fundamentals of Enterprise Management" (2000)
"Economic behavior: a person-firm-State Economy." (1993)
"Economic growth. From the past to the future. "(2003)

== See also ==
- List of economists
