= Kožlí (Písek District) =

- Municipality
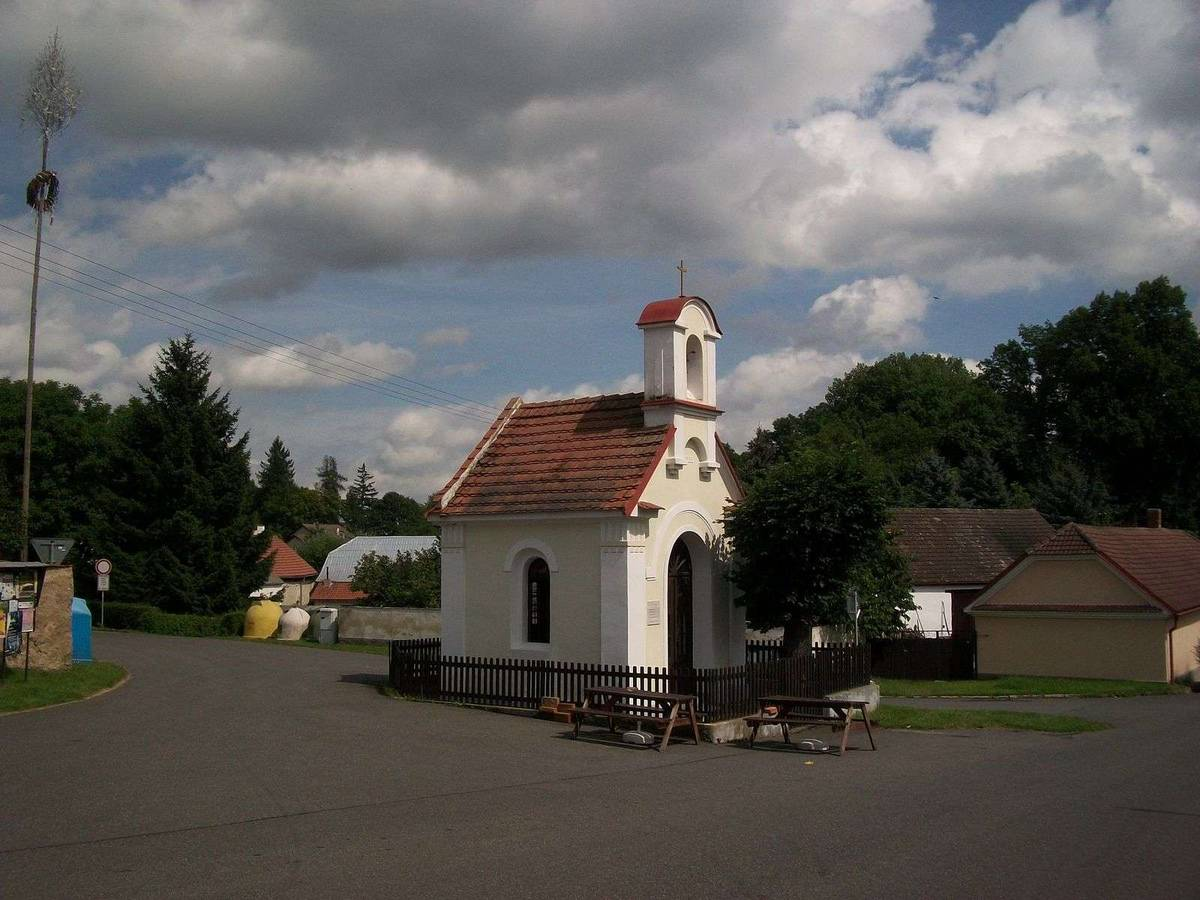
- Chapel in the centre of Kožlí

- Location in the Czech Republic
- Coordinates: 49°30′57″N 14°8′48″E
- Country: Czech Republic
- Region: South Bohemian
- District: Písek
- First mentioned: 1396

Area
  - Total: 4.34 km^{2} (1.68 sq mi)
- Elevation: 398 m (1,306 ft)

Population (2026-01-01)
  - Total: 53
  - Density: 12/km^{2} (32/sq mi)
- Time zone: UTC+1 (CET)
  - Summer (DST): UTC+2 (CEST)
- Postal code: 398 04
- Website: www.obeckozli.cz

Kožlí (German: Koschli) is a municipality and village in Písek District in the South Bohemian Region of the Czech Republic. It has about 50 inhabitants.

== Etymology ==
The name of the village was derived either from the personal name Kozel (meaning "Kozel's") or from goat farming ('goat' = koza in Czech).

== Geography ==
Kožlí is located about 23 kilometres (14 mi) north of Písek and 60 km (37 mi) south of Prague. It lies in the Benešov Uplands. The highest point is at 453 m (1,486 ft) above sea level. The municipality is situated on the western shore of the Orlík Reservoir, built on the Vltava River. There are also several small ponds, supplied by local brooks.

== History ==
The first written mention of Kožlí is from 1396.

== Demographics ==
Historical population

Year	Pop.	±%
1869	297	—
1880	332	+11.8%
1890	265	−20.2%
1900	230	−13.2%
1910	200	−13.0%

Year	Pop.	±%
1921	214	+7.0%
1930	206	−3.7%
1950	116	−43.7%
1961	81	−30.2%
1970	74	−8.6%

Year	Pop.	±%
1980	61	−17.6%
1991	41	−32.8%
2001	53	+29.3%
2011	52	−1.9%
2021	47	−9.6%

Source: Censuses

== Transport ==
There are no railways or major roads running through the municipal territory.

== Sights ==
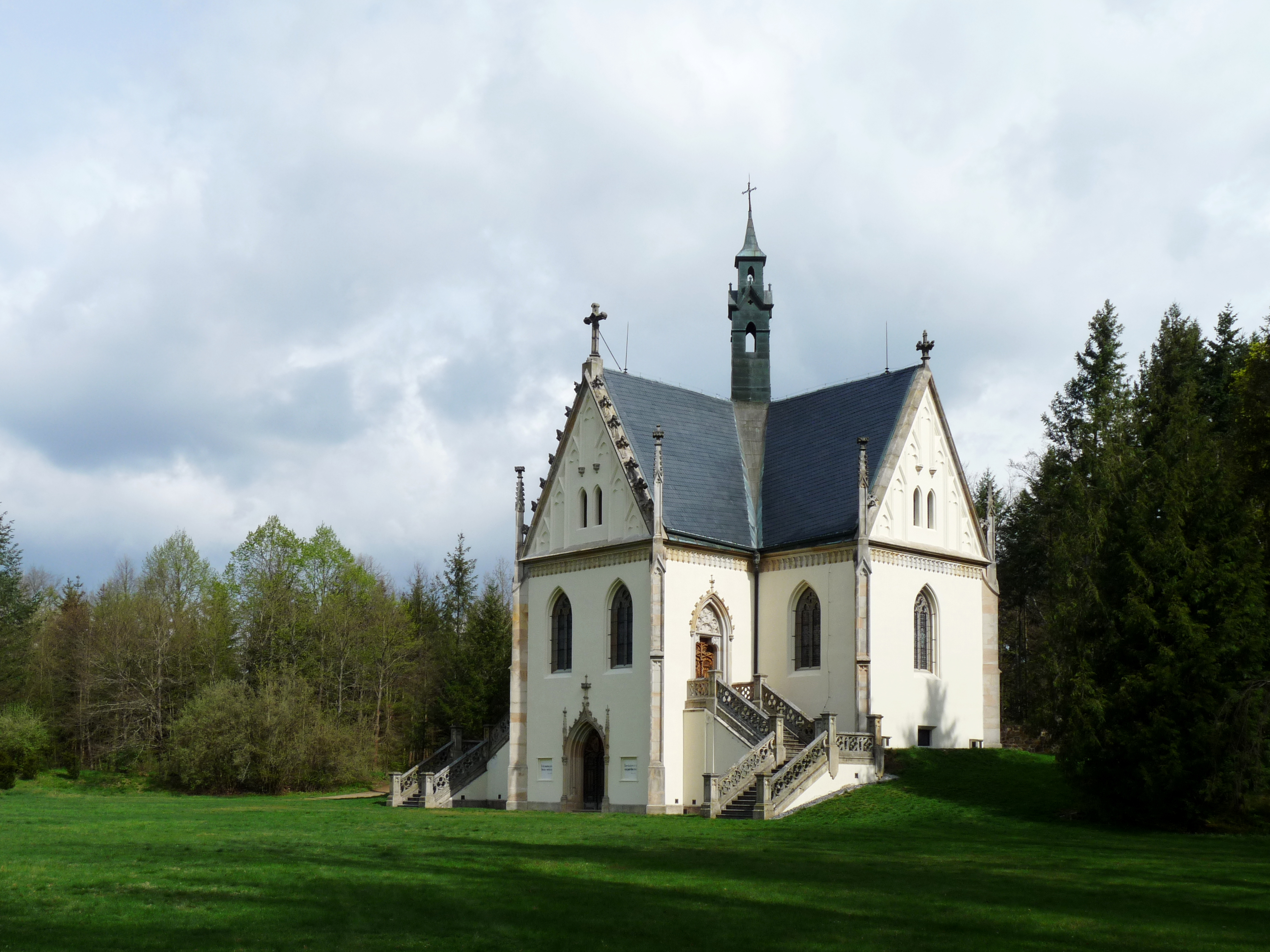
Schwarzenberg Tomb

The northern part of the large park of the Orlík Castle extends into the territory of Kožlí. It includes the Schwarzenberg Tomb, built in the neo-Gothic style in 1875–1877. It contains the remains of several members of the cadet branch of the Schwarzenberg family, the most notable being Field Marshal Prince Karl Philipp of Schwarzenberg (1771–1820). The tomb is not open to the public.
