= Olešná (Rakovník District) =

- Municipality
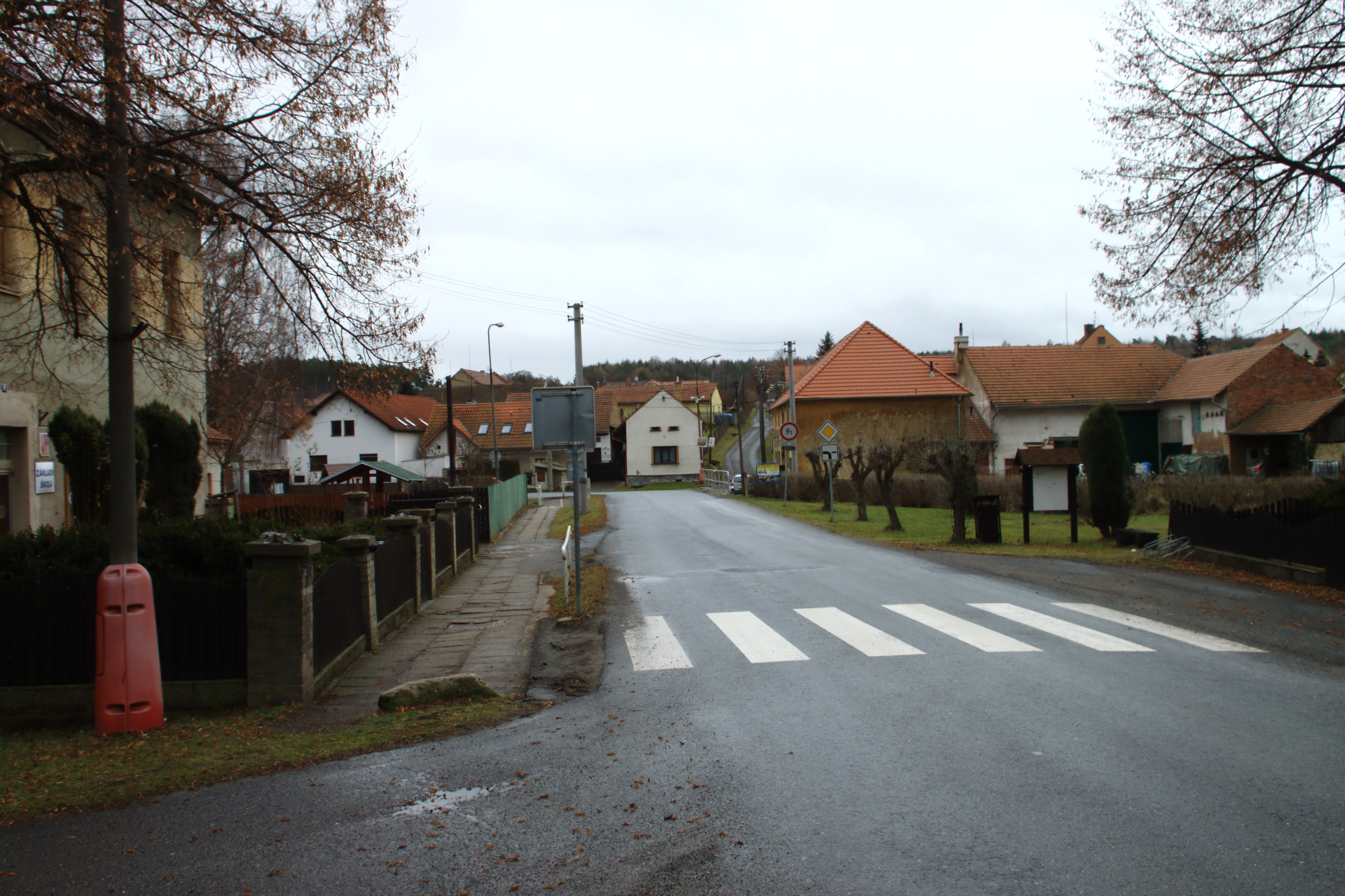
- Centre of Olešná

- Location in the Czech Republic
- Coordinates: 50°7′43″N 13°41′45″E
- Country: Czech Republic
- Region: Central Bohemian
- District: Rakovník
- First mentioned: 1352

Area
  - Total: 10.89 km^{2} (4.20 sq mi)
- Elevation: 379 m (1,243 ft)

Population (2026-01-01)
  - Total: 654
  - Density: 60.1/km^{2} (156/sq mi)
- Time zone: UTC+1 (CET)
  - Summer (DST): UTC+2 (CEST)
- Postal code: 269 01
- Website: www.obec-olesna.cz

Olešná is a municipality and village in Rakovník District in the Central Bohemian Region of the Czech Republic. It has about 700 inhabitants.

== Demographics ==
Historical population
Year	Pop.	±%
1869	607	—
1880	736	+21.3%
1890	638	−13.3%
1900	690	+8.2%
1910	727	+5.4%
1921	674	−7.3%
1930	696	+3.3%
1950	536	−23.0%
1961	508	−5.2%
1970	500	−1.6%
1980	517	+3.4%
1991	538	+4.1%
2001	515	−4.3%
2011	531	+3.1%
2021	559	+5.3%
Source: Censuses
