= Kozlovka, Volgograd Oblast =

Kozlovka Козловка
- Selo
- Location within Volgograd Oblast Location within Russia
- Coordinates: 50°59′N 44°21′E
- Country: Russia
- Region: Volgograd Oblast
- District: Rudnyansky District
- Time zone: UTC+4:00

Kozlovka (Russian: Козловка) is a rural locality (a selo) and the administrative center of Kozlovskoye Rural Settlement, Rudnyansky District, Volgograd Oblast, Russia. The population was 490 as of 2010. There are 3 streets.

== Geography ==
Kozlovka is located in steppe, on the Khopyorsko-Buzulukskaya Plain, 35 km northwest of Rudnya (the district's administrative centre) by road. Lemeshkino is the nearest rural locality.
