= Olešná (Pelhřimov District) =

- Municipality
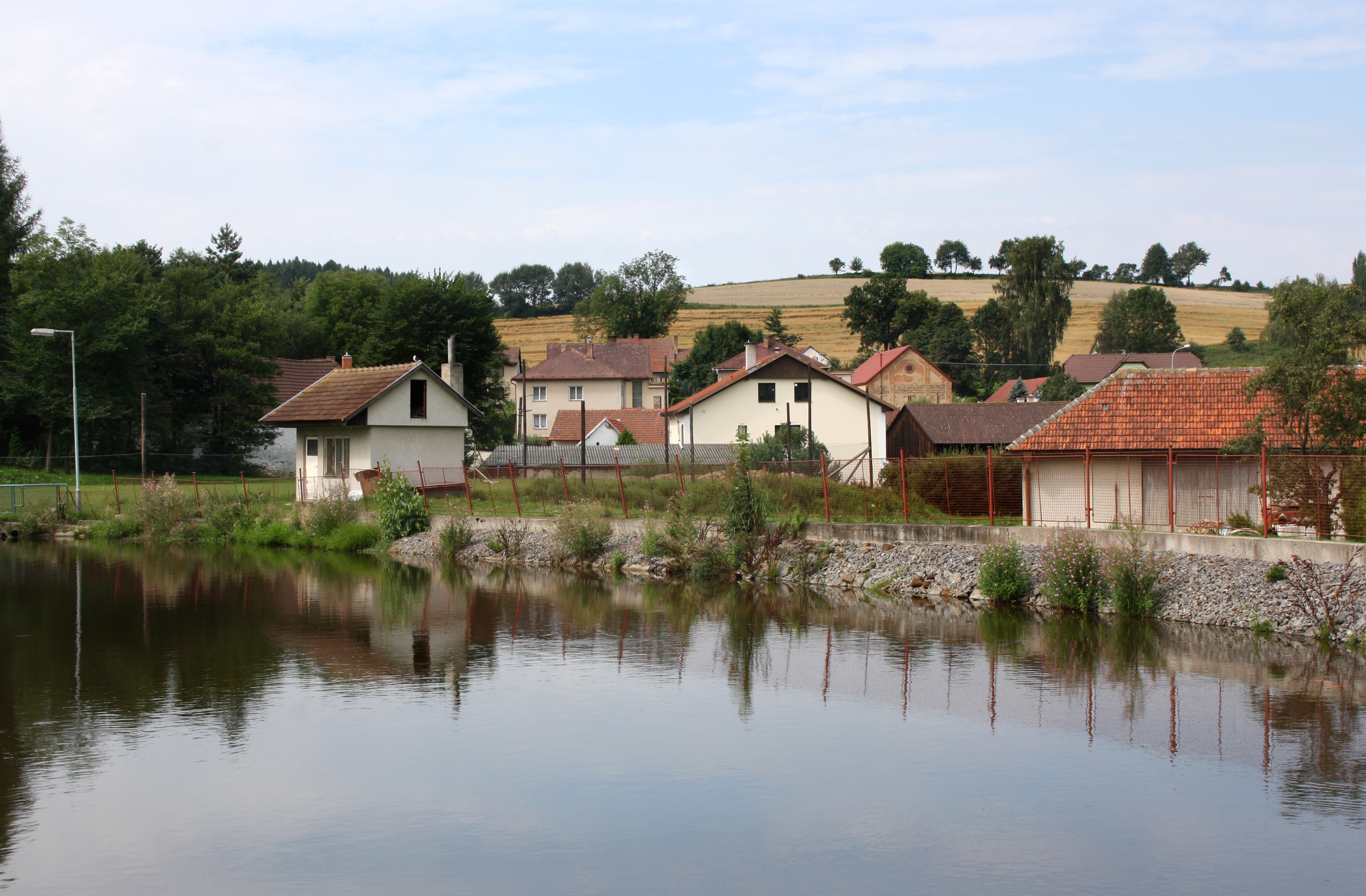
- Pond in the centre of Olešná

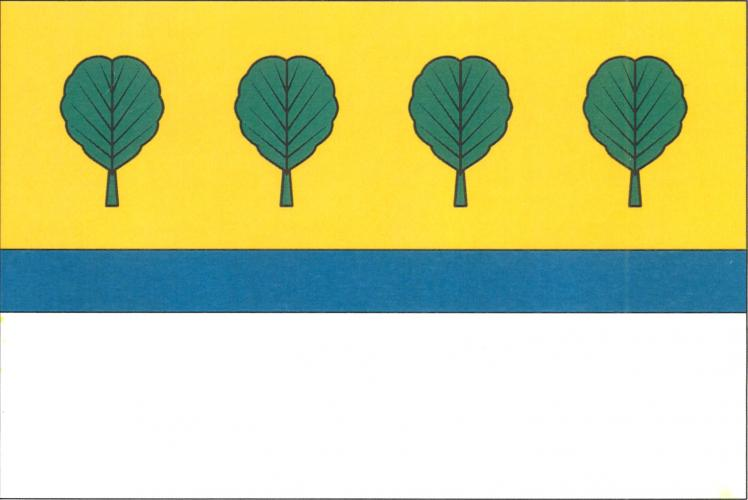
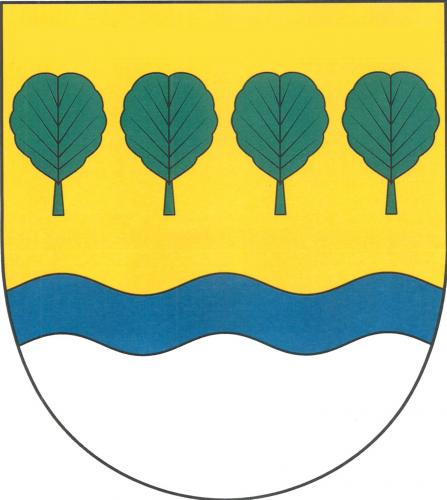
- Flag Coat of arms

- Location in the Czech Republic
- Coordinates: 49°26′45″N 15°15′49″E
- Country: Czech Republic
- Region: Vysočina
- District: Pelhřimov
- First mentioned: 1379

Area
  - Total: 12.74 km^{2} (4.92 sq mi)
- Elevation: 517 m (1,696 ft)

Population (2026-01-01)
  - Total: 564
  - Density: 44.3/km^{2} (115/sq mi)
- Time zone: UTC+1 (CET)
  - Summer (DST): UTC+2 (CEST)
- Postal code: 393 01
- Website: www.olesna.cz

Olešná is a municipality and village in Pelhřimov District in the Vysočina Region of the Czech Republic. It has about 600 inhabitants.

Olešná lies approximately 4 kilometres (2 mi) east of Pelhřimov, 25 km (16 mi) west of Jihlava, and 94 km (58 mi) south-east of Prague.

== Administrative division ==
Olešná consists of four municipal parts (in brackets population according to the 2021 census):

- Olešná (352)
- Chválov (46)
- Plevnice (64)
- Řemenov (82)

== History ==
The first written mention of Olešná is from 1379.

From 1 January 1980 to 23 November 1990, Olešná, Chválov, Plevnice and Řemenov were municipal parts of Pelhřimov.

== Demographics ==
Historical population
Year	Pop.	±%
1869	754	—
1880	809	+7.3%
1890	759	−6.2%
1900	729	−4.0%
1910	798	+9.5%
1921	811	+1.6%
1930	753	−7.2%
1950	586	−22.2%
1961	543	−7.3%
1970	514	−5.3%
1980	477	−7.2%
1991	477	+0.0%
2001	533	+11.7%
2011	587	+10.1%
2021	544	−7.3%
Source: Censuses
