= Sněžné (Žďár nad Sázavou District) =

- Market town
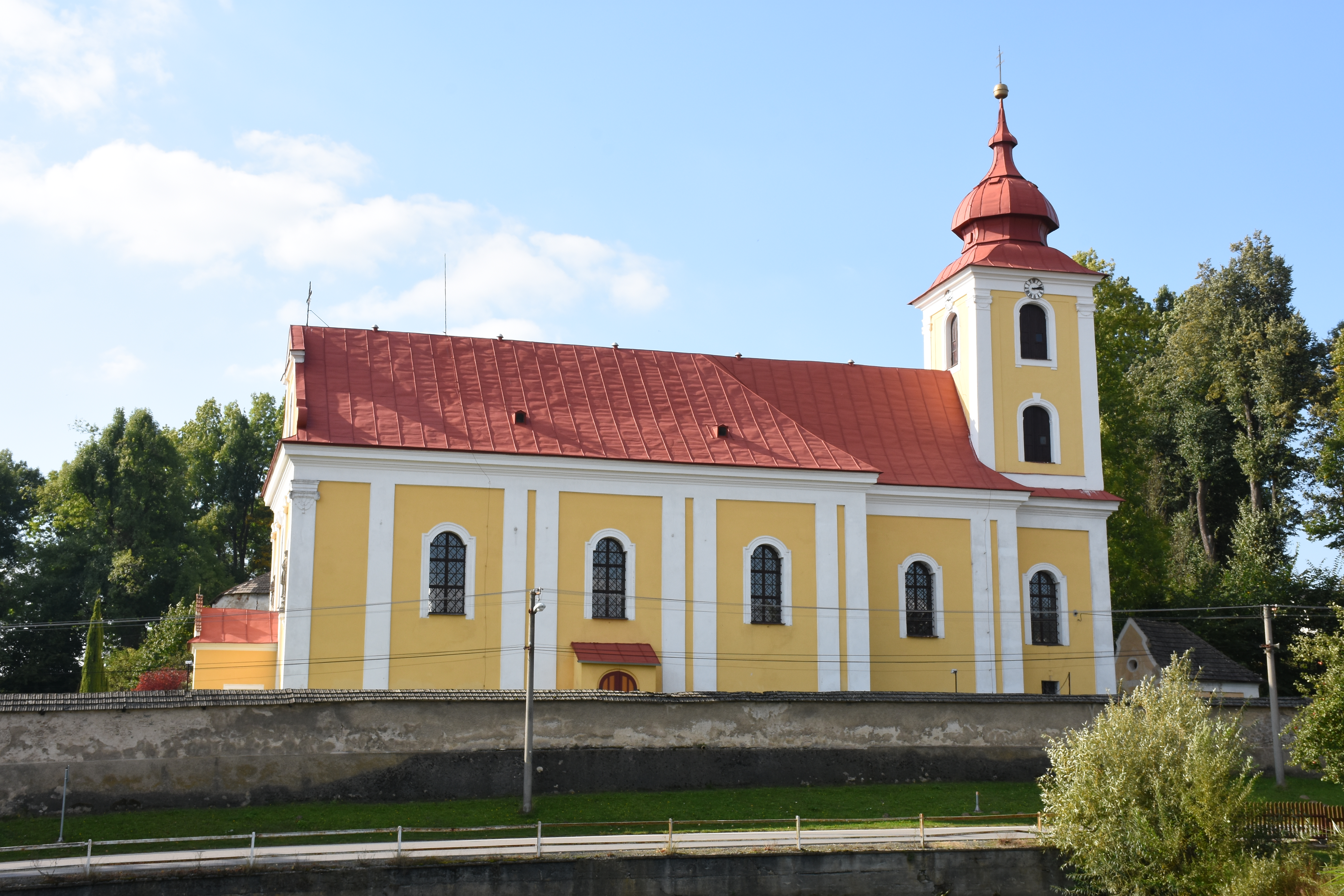
- Church of the Holy Cross

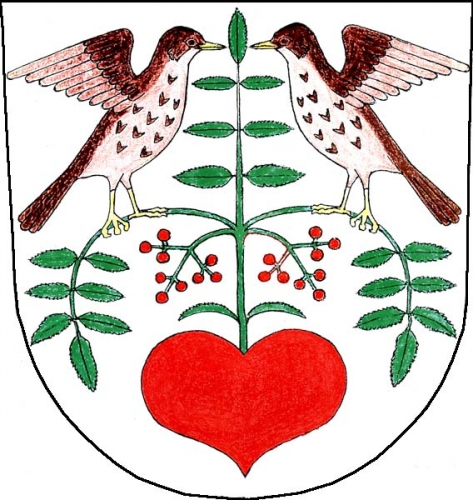
- Flag Coat of arms

- Location in the Czech Republic
- Coordinates: 49°38′44″N 16°7′18″E
- Country: Czech Republic
- Region: Vysočina
- District: Žďár nad Sázavou
- First mentioned: 1335

Area
  - Total: 23.45 km^{2} (9.05 sq mi)
- Elevation: 673 m (2,208 ft)

Population (2026-01-01)
  - Total: 765
  - Density: 32.6/km^{2} (84.5/sq mi)
- Time zone: UTC+1 (CET)
  - Summer (DST): UTC+2 (CEST)
- Postal code: 592 03
- Website: www.snezne.cz

Sněžné (Czech pronunciation: [ˈsɲɛʃnɛː]; until 1948 Německé; German: Niemetzke) is a market town in Žďár nad Sázavou District in the Vysočina Region of the Czech Republic. It has about 800 inhabitants.

== Administrative division ==
Sněžné consists of seven municipal parts (in brackets population according to the 2021 census):

- Sněžné (541)
- Blatiny (46)
- Krátká (21)
- Milovy (30)
- Podlesí (18)
- Samotín (21)
- Vříšť (41)

Vříšť forms an exclave of the municipal territory.

== Etymology ==
The initial name of Sněžné was Německé (a Czech adjective, meaning 'German'). The modern name Sněžné means 'snowy' in Czech.

== Geography ==
Sněžné is located about 15 kilometres (9 mi) northeast of Žďár nad Sázavou and 58 km (36 mi) northwest of Brno. It lies in the Upper Svratka Highlands. The highest point is the Křovina hill at 830 m (2,720 ft) above sea level. The Svratka River forms the northern municipal border. There are two fishponds in the municipality, Milovský rybník and Nový rybník. The whole municipal territory lies within the Žďárské vrchy Protected Landscape Area.

== History ==
The first written mention of Sněžné (called Německé at that time) is from 1335. In the late 14th century and in the 15th century, the village was part of the Bystřice estate owned by the Pernštejn family. In 1500, it was joined to the Nové Město na Moravě estate. The village was promoted to a market town in 1825.

In 1948, the municipality was renamed to its current name.

== Demographics ==
Historical population

Year	Pop.	±%
1869	1,931	—
1880	1,868	−3.3%
1890	1,804	−3.4%
1900	1,762	−2.3%
1910	1,684	−4.4%

Year	Pop.	±%
1921	1,524	−9.5%
1930	1,628	+6.8%
1950	1,128	−30.7%
1961	1,087	−3.6%
1970	894	−17.8%

Year	Pop.	±%
1980	758	−15.2%
1991	752	−0.8%
2001	797	+6.0%
2011	725	−9.0%
2021	718	−1.0%

Source: Censuses

== Transport ==
There are no railways or major roads passing through the municipality.

== Sights ==
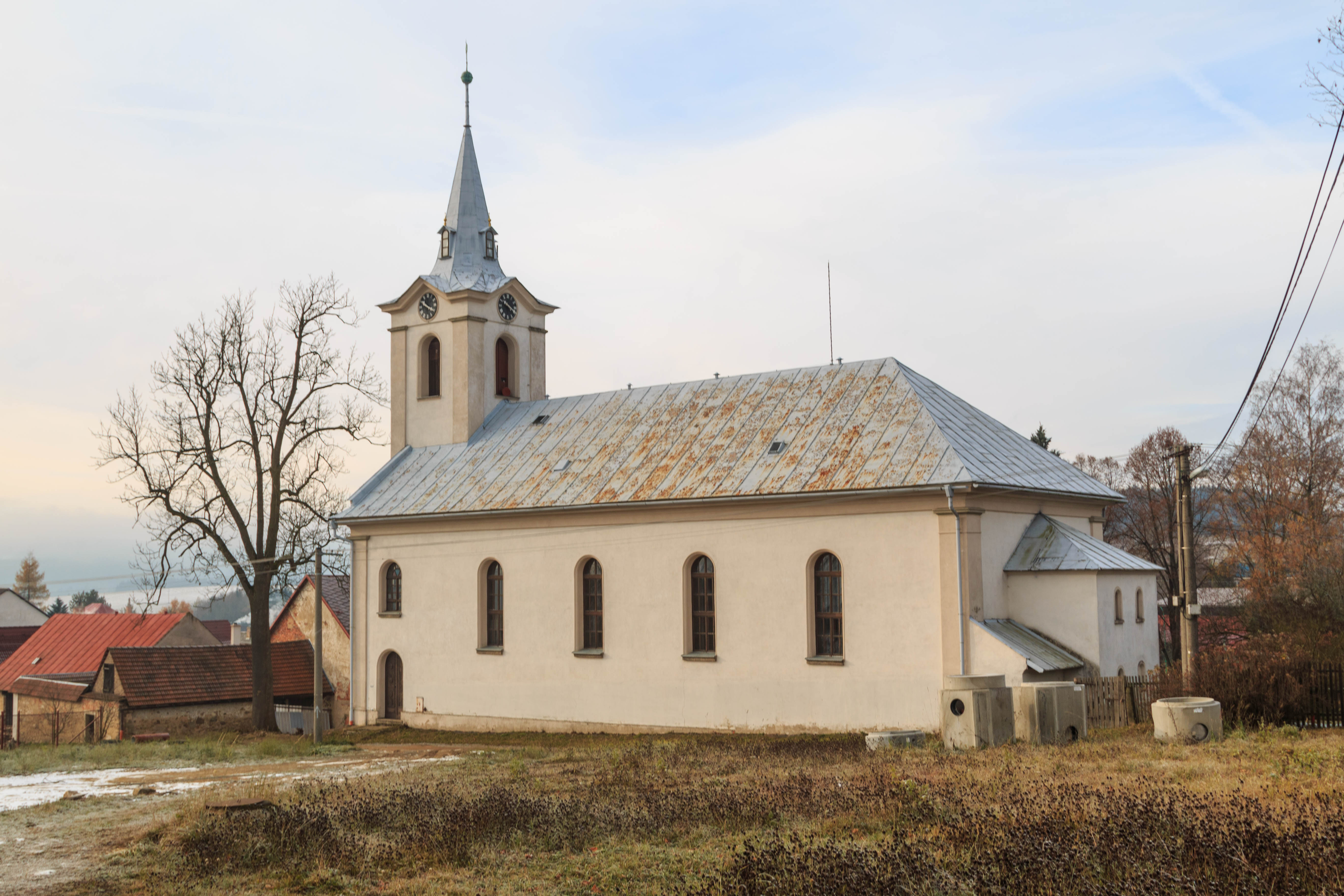
Evangelical church

The main landmark of Sněžné is the Church of the Holy Cross. It was built in the late Baroque style in 1753–1755.

The Evangelical church was built in 1788. The tower was added in the middle of the 19th century.

In Vříšť is a former medieval fortress, rebuilt into a Baroque manor house. Today it serves as a hotel and restaurant.
