= Záluží (Litoměřice District) =

- Municipality
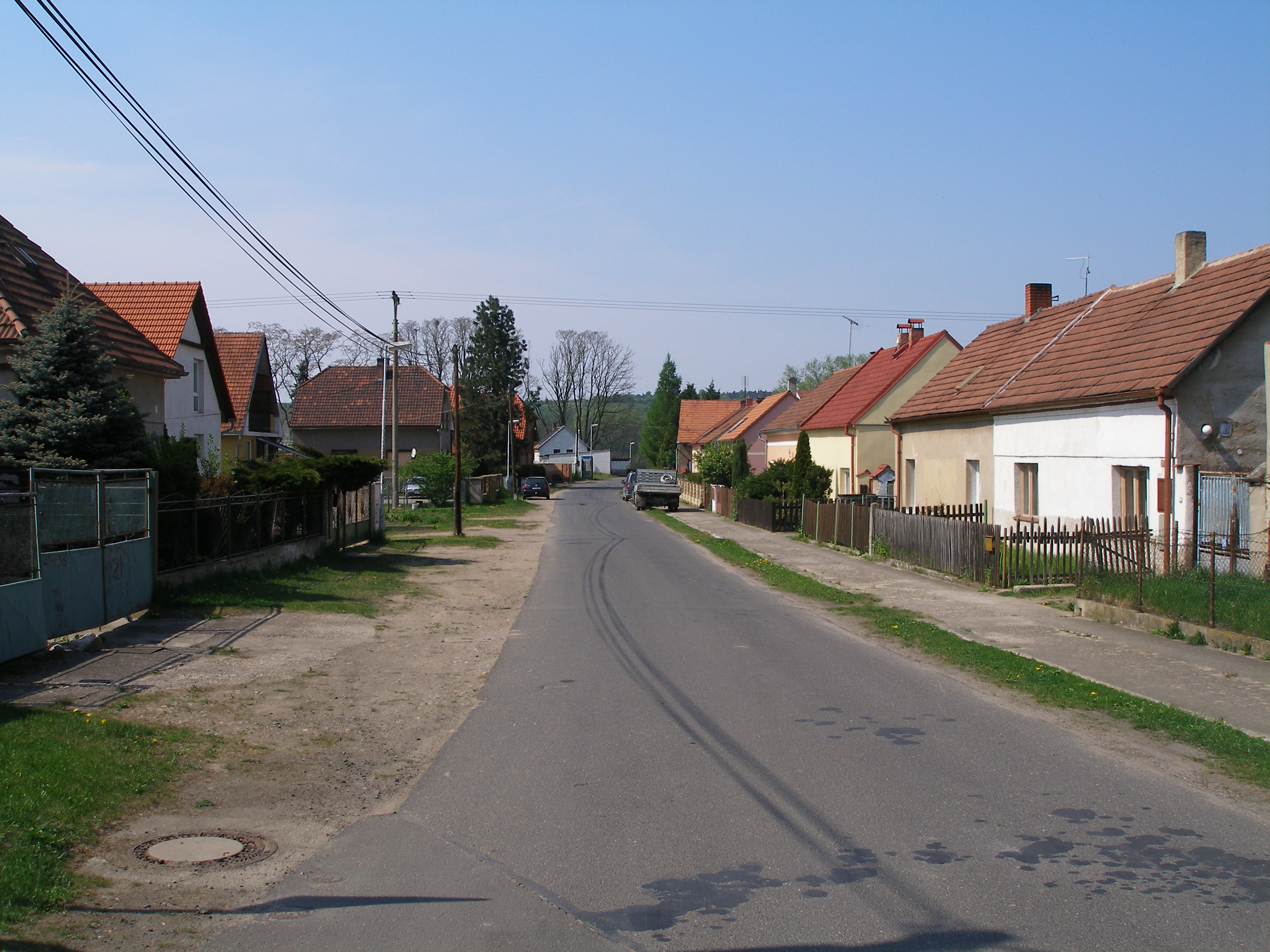
- A street in Záluží

- Flag Coat of arms

- Location in the Czech Republic
- Coordinates: 50°27′37″N 14°19′21″E
- Country: Czech Republic
- Region: Ústí nad Labem
- District: Litoměřice
- First mentioned: 1295

Area
  - Total: 4.20 km^{2} (1.62 sq mi)
- Elevation: 157 m (515 ft)

Population (2026-01-01)
  - Total: 220
  - Density: 52/km^{2} (140/sq mi)
- Time zone: UTC+1 (CET)
  - Summer (DST): UTC+2 (CEST)
- Postal code: 413 01
- Website: www.ouzaluzi.cz

Záluží (German: Salusch) is a municipality and village in Litoměřice District in the Ústí nad Labem Region of the Czech Republic. It has about 200 inhabitants.

Záluží lies approximately 18 kilometres (11 mi) south-east of Litoměřice, 31 km (19 mi) south-east of Ústí nad Labem, and 42 km (26 mi) north of Prague.

== Administrative division ==
Záluží consists of two municipal parts (in brackets population according to the 2021 census):

- Záluží (154)
- Kozlovice (69)

== Demographics ==
Historical population
Year	Pop.	±%
1869	159	—
1880	143	−10.1%
1890	144	+0.7%
1900	161	+11.8%
1910	220	+36.6%
1921	204	−7.3%
1930	177	−13.2%
1950	150	−15.3%
1961	175	+16.7%
1970	169	−3.4%
1980	123	−27.2%
1991	88	−28.5%
2001	88	+0.0%
2011	152	+72.7%
2021	223	+46.7%
Source: Censuses
