= Kozlov (Olomouc District) =

- Municipality
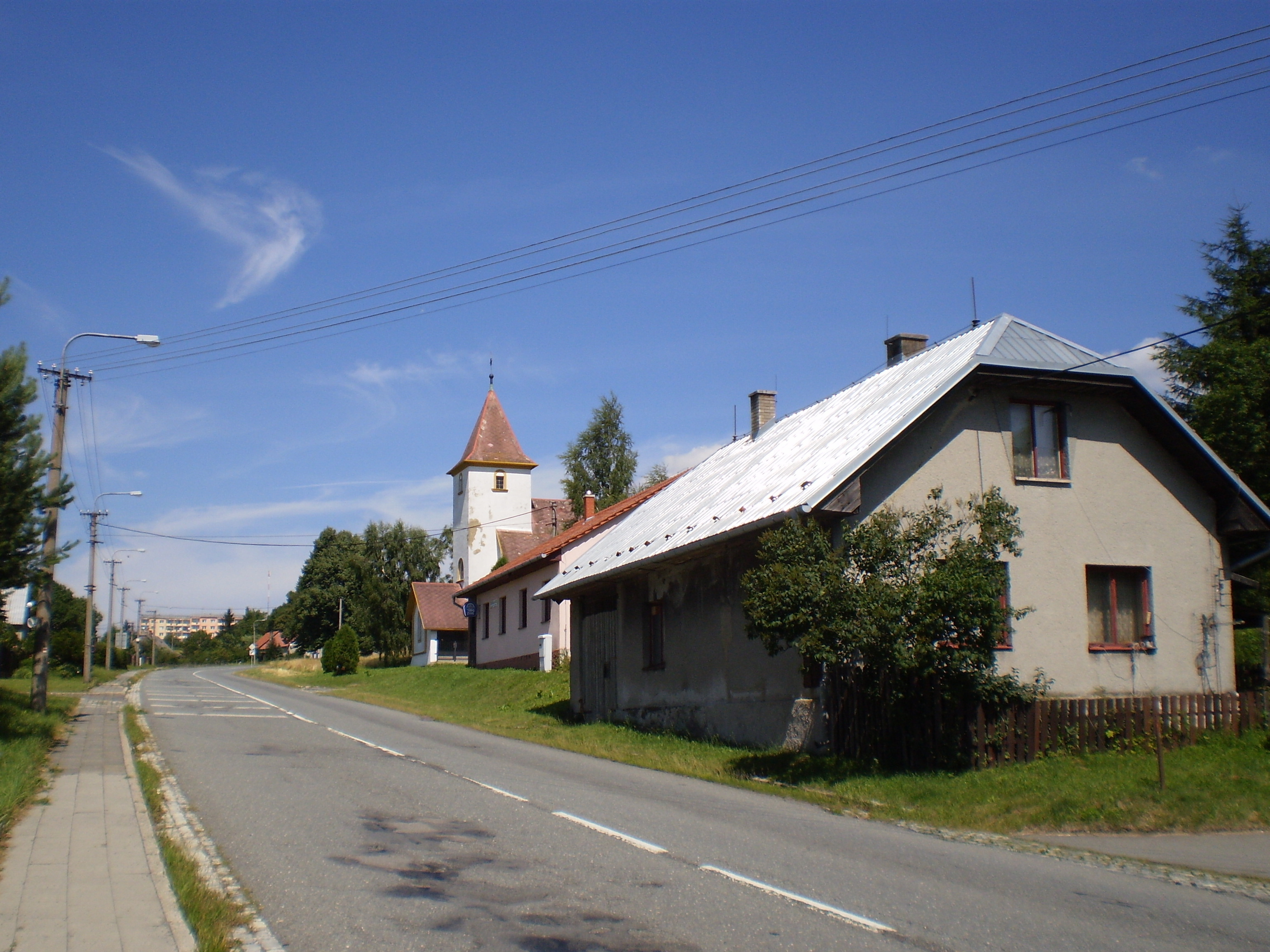
- Main road of Kozlov

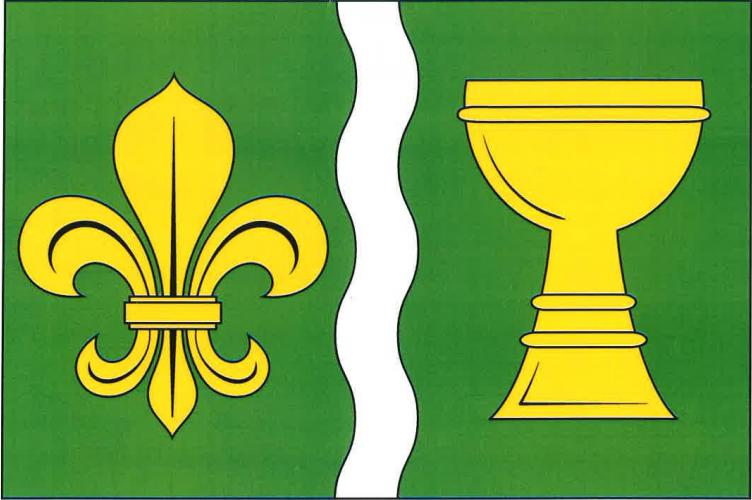
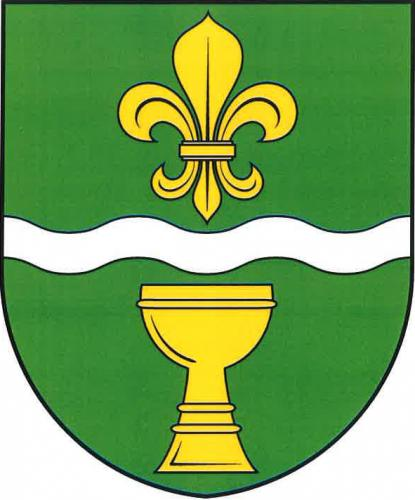
- Flag Coat of arms

- Location in the Czech Republic
- Coordinates: 49°36′12″N 17°32′4″E
- Country: Czech Republic
- Region: Olomouc
- District: Olomouc
- First mentioned: 1324

Area
  - Total: 45.76 km^{2} (17.67 sq mi)
- Elevation: 620 m (2,030 ft)

Population (2026-01-01)
  - Total: 256
  - Density: 5.59/km^{2} (14.5/sq mi)
- Time zone: UTC+1 (CET)
  - Summer (DST): UTC+2 (CEST)
- Postal codes: 751 31, 783 57
- Website: www.obeckozlov.cz

Kozlov (German: Koslau) is a municipality and village in Olomouc District in the Olomouc Region of the Czech Republic. It has about 300 inhabitants.

== Administrative division ==
Kozlov consists of two municipal parts (in brackets population according to the 2021 census):

- Kozlov (156)
- Slavkov (64)

== History ==
The first written mention of Kozlov is from 1324.

Kozlov became a separate municipality on 1 January 2016 by reduction of Libavá Military Training Area.

== Demographics ==
Historical population
Year	Pop.	±%
1869	1,176	—
1880	1,225	+4.2%
1890	1,187	−3.1%
1900	1,192	+0.4%
1910	1,241	+4.1%
1921	1,110	−10.6%
1930	1,081	−2.6%
1950	0	−100.0%
1961	177	—
1970	160	−9.6%
1980	255	+59.4%
1991	260	+2.0%
2001	392	+50.8%
2011	351	−10.5%
2021	220	−37.3%
Source: Censuses
