= Kozioł (surname) =

Kozioł is a Polish-language surname literally meaning he-goat. notable people with this surname include:

- Igor Kozioł (born 1967), Polish footballer
- Joe Koziol (born 1967), American soccer player
- Magdalena Kozioł (born 1981), Polish judoka
- Natalia Kozioł (born 2000), Polish rhythmic gymnast
- Scott Koziol (born 1972), temporary bassist for Linkin Park
- Stan Koziol, (1965–2014), American soccer player
- Tanner Koziol, American football player
- Urszula Kozioł (1931–2025), Polish poet, writer and dramatist

== See also ==
- Koziols, Latvian-language form of the surname
- Kozel (surname)
