= Kozel (surname) =

Kozel is a surname, meaning 'male goat' in Czech (feminine: Kozlová) and Slovene. Notable people with the surname include:

- Ben Kozel (born 1973), Australian adventurer, author and film maker
- Chet Kozel (1919–1982), American football lineman
- István Kozel, Slovenian writer
- Luboš Kozel (born 1971), Czech football player and manager
- Roman Kozel (born 1997), Belarusian footballer
- Yevgeny Kozel (born 2001), Belarusian footballer

== See also ==
- Kozioł (surname)
- Kozlov (surname)
