= Kozlovka, Totemsky District, Vologda Oblast =

Kozlovka Козловка
- Village
- Location within Vologda Oblast Location within Russia
- Coordinates: 59°55′N 42°31′E
- Country: Russia
- Region: Vologda Oblast
- District: Totemsky District
- Time zone: UTC+3:00

Kozlovka (Russian: Козловка) is a rural locality (a village) in Kalininskoye Rural Settlement, Totemsky District, Vologda Oblast, Russia. The population was 12 as of 2002.

== Geography ==
Kozlovka is located 17 km southwest of Totma (the district's administrative centre) by road. Ignachevo is the nearest rural locality.
