= Kozlovka, Amur Oblast =

Kozlovka Козловка
- Selo
- Location within Amur Oblast Location within Russia
- Coordinates: 51°49′N 129°11′E
- Country: Russia
- Region: Amur Oblast
- District: Mazanovsky District
- Time zone: UTC+9:00

Kozlovka (Russian: Козловка) is a rural locality (a selo) in Bogoslovsky Selsoviet of Mazanovsky District, Amur Oblast, Russia. The population was 73 as of 2018. There is 1 street.

== Geography ==
Kozlovka is located on the left bank of the Selemdzha River, 33 km northeast of Novokiyevsky Uval (the district's administrative centre) by road. Bogoslovka is the nearest rural locality.
