= Olimpiada Kozlova =

Russian economist (1906–1986)

Olimpiada Vasilyevna Kozlova
- Олимпиада Васильевна Козлова
- Born: 6 August 1906; Pokrovskaya Sloboda, Novouzensky Uyezd, Saratov Governorate, Russian Empire
- Died: 7 December 1986 (aged 80); Moscow, Soviet Union
- Citizenship: Soviet
- Scientific career
- Fields: Economics
- Institutions: State University of Management (rector)

Olimpiada Vasilyevna Kozlova (Russian: Олимпиада Васильевна Козлова, August 6, 1906 – December 7, 1986) was a Soviet economist, professor, and founder of management education in the Soviet Union.

== Life and career ==
Kozlova was born on 6 August [O.S. 24 July], 1906, in the Pokrovskaya Sloboda (now the city of Engels, Saratov Oblast) into a fishing family. She was ethnically Russian.

Her career began at the age of 10 in the Pokrovskaya artel of fishers.

In the mid-1920s, she worked as a turner at the Karbolit plant (Orekhovo-Zuyevo, Moscow Oblast), then at the Moselectric plant in Moscow.

From 1927 to 1932, she was secretary of the village council of the village of Chernoe Ozero, Shatursky District, deputy chairman of the council, and deputy chairman of the executive committee of the council.

At the same time, Kozlova improved her education, entered the Moscow Institute of Soviet Cooperative Trade, which she graduated in 1937, and then the Moscow State Pedagogical University.

In 1940 she completed her postgraduate studies at the Moscow Institute of National Economy and defended her thesis for the degree of candidate of economic sciences. At the same time, she worked as a teacher at this institute and the Higher Party School under the Central Committee of the Communist Party of the Soviet Union. She devoted the next ten years to elective party work.

From 1940 to 1941, Kozlova was elected 2nd secretary of the Moskvoretsk district committee of the CPSU.

At the beginning of the Great Patriotic War, she was engaged in the formation of divisions. From 1941 to 1945, she was elected 1st secretary of the Moskvoretsky district committee of the CPSU. She prepared for leadership work in the underground in the event of the surrender of Moscow to the Germans. After the end of the war from 1946 to 1950, she was the Secretary of the Moscow Committee of the CPSU(b).

From 1950, her scientific and pedagogical activity began. She was appointed rector of the Moscow Institute of Engineering and Economics and soon turned it into one of the leading economic universities in the USSR. The institute graduated economic engineers for various sectors of the national economy. Their main task was to organize socialist production. But Kozlova went further. She challenged her colleagues to reorganize the training of economic engineers into management training. In 1958, the Research Laboratory of Economics and Organization of Production was created at the institute, as well as one of the first Scientific Computing Centers in the country.

In 1960, Kozlova defended her doctoral dissertation and was awarded the academic title of professor. She reflected her scientific research in more than 50 scientific works and many textbooks and teaching aids. One of the most famous textbooks, written together with I. N. Kuznetsov, Scientific Foundations of Production Management, was published in the USSR and a number of other countries.

In 1966, the first department in the USSR which was engaged in the development of scientific problems and the training of qualified personnel in the field of the theory of socialist production management was created in the institute. Kozlova became its first leader.

In 1973, Kozlova was awarded the title of Honorary Doctor of the Prague Higher School of Economics (Czechoslovakia).

In 1975, the development of management education allowed the institute to transform into the first Moscow Institute of Management in the USSR. Kozlova worked as its rector for 35 years. Under her, the institute became the first leading management university in the country, earning a high government award - the Order of the Red Banner of Labor. With her active participation, a new complex of buildings of the institute was built in the southeast of Moscow, one of the few real university modern campuses. The institute first turned into the State Academy of Management, and from 1998 into the State University of Management.

Kozlova died in Moscow in 1986. She was buried at the Kuntsevo Cemetery.

== Awards ==
- Two Orders of Lenin (1967, 6 August 1976)
- Order of the October Revolution (1971)
- Order of the Patriotic War, 1st degree (1947)
- Two Orders of the Red Banner of Labour (1942, 1961)
- Order of Friendship of Peoples (17 June 1981)
- Order of the Red Star (1943)

== Legacy ==
- Kozlova's granddaughter and well-known phlox breeder, Yelena Alekseyevna Konstantinova, named one of the varieties she bred "Olimpiada" in honor of Kozlova.
- Kozlova's grave.
