= Olešná (Písek District) =

- Municipality
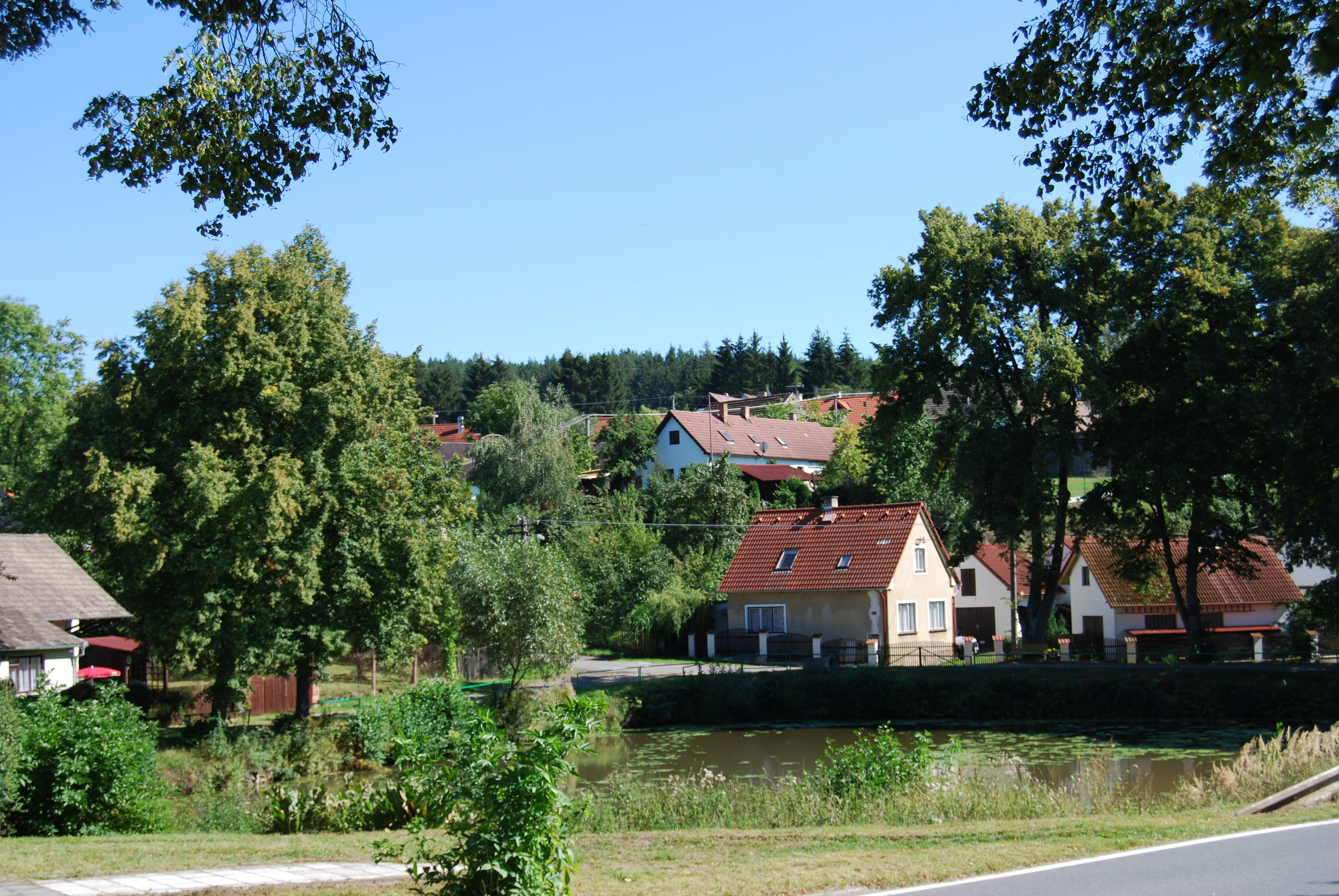
- Centre of Olešná

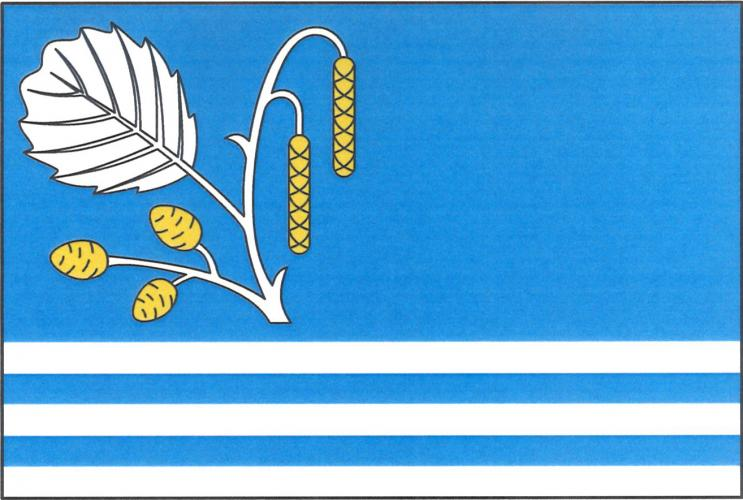
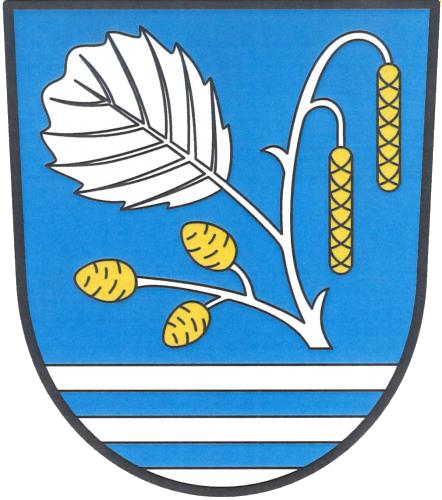
- Flag Coat of arms

- Location in the Czech Republic
- Coordinates: 49°20′46″N 14°18′38″E
- Country: Czech Republic
- Region: South Bohemian
- District: Písek
- First mentioned: 1379

Area
  - Total: 5.24 km^{2} (2.02 sq mi)
- Elevation: 426 m (1,398 ft)

Population (2026-01-01)
  - Total: 131
  - Density: 25.0/km^{2} (64.7/sq mi)
- Time zone: UTC+1 (CET)
  - Summer (DST): UTC+2 (CEST)
- Postal code: 398 43
- Website: www.ouolesna.cz

Olešná is a municipality and village in Písek District in the South Bohemian Region of the Czech Republic. It has about 100 inhabitants.

Olešná lies approximately 14 kilometres (9 mi) east of Písek, 43 km (27 mi) north of České Budějovice, and 83 km (52 mi) south of Prague.

== Demographics ==
Historical population
Year	Pop.	±%
1869	472	—
1880	464	−1.7%
1890	413	−11.0%
1900	392	−5.1%
1910	407	+3.8%
1921	390	−4.2%
1930	357	−8.5%
1950	274	−23.2%
1961	250	−8.8%
1970	188	−24.8%
1980	114	−39.4%
1991	102	−10.5%
2001	83	−18.6%
2011	103	+24.1%
2021	151	+46.6%
Source: Censuses
