= Olešná (Beroun District) =

- Municipality
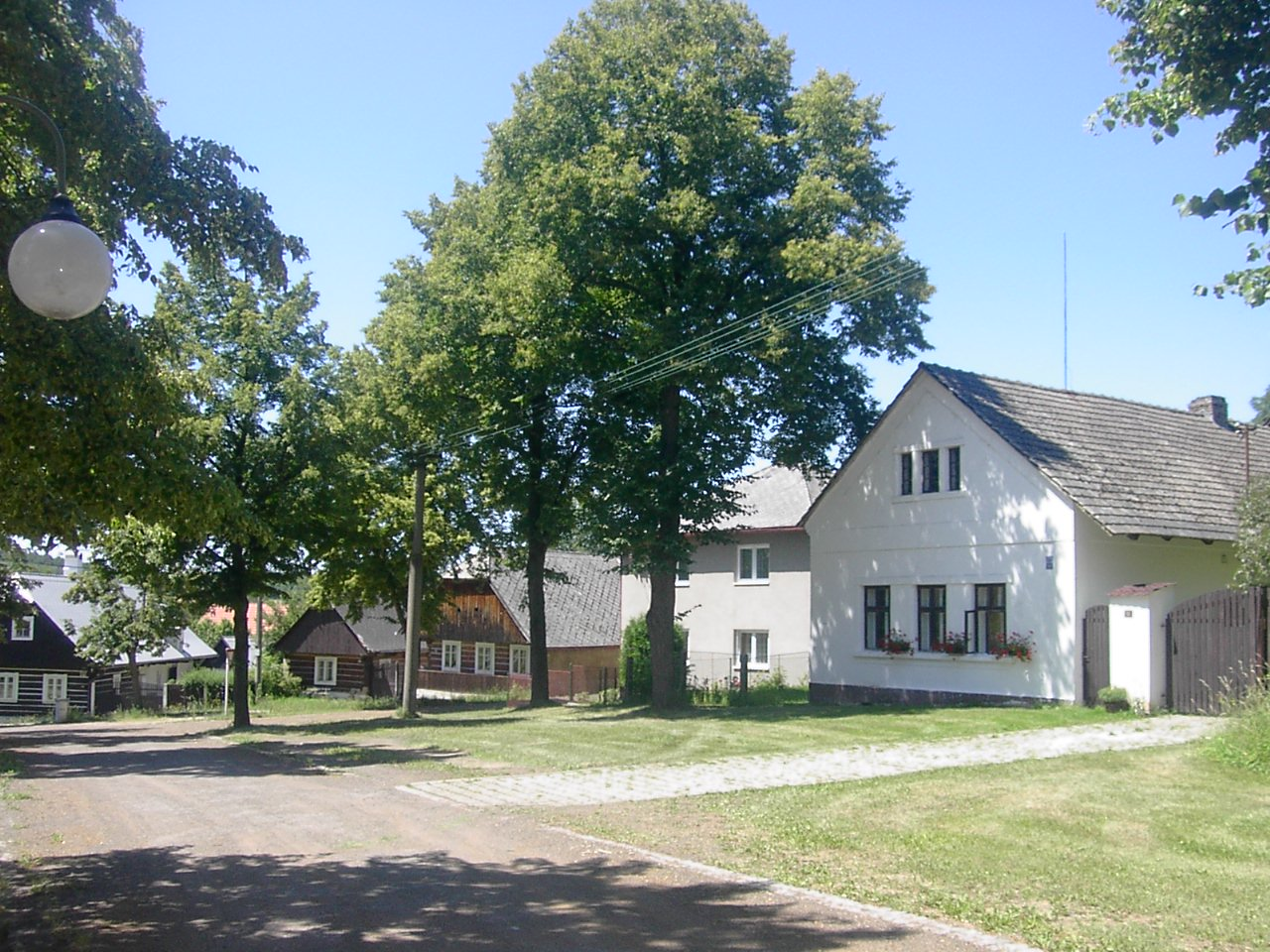
- Centre of Olešná

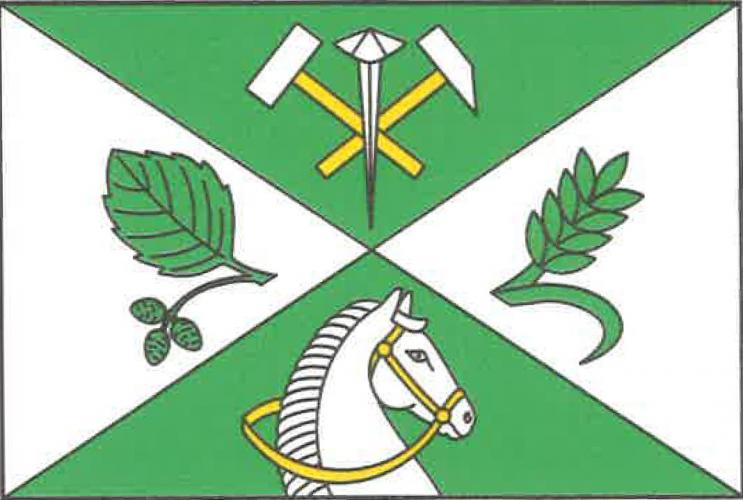
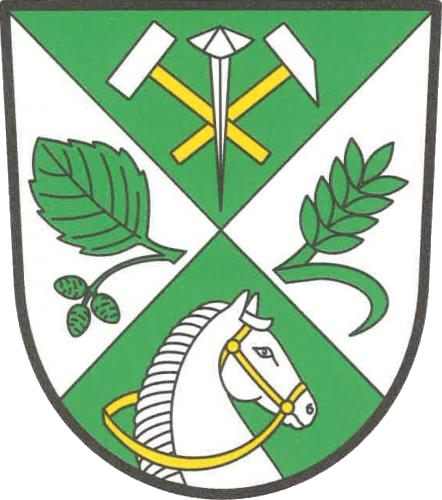
- Flag Coat of arms

- Location in the Czech Republic
- Coordinates: 49°46′50″N 13°48′36″E
- Country: Czech Republic
- Region: Central Bohemian
- District: Beroun
- First mentioned: 1331

Area
  - Total: 10.69 km^{2} (4.13 sq mi)
- Elevation: 491 m (1,611 ft)

Population (2026-01-01)
  - Total: 461
  - Density: 43.1/km^{2} (112/sq mi)
- Time zone: UTC+1 (CET)
  - Summer (DST): UTC+2 (CEST)
- Postal code: 267 64
- Website: www.olesna-be.cz

Olešná is a municipality and village in Beroun District in the Central Bohemian Region of the Czech Republic. It has about 500 inhabitants. The centre of Olešná with well preserved folk architecture is protected as a village monument zone.

== Demographics ==
Historical population
| Year | Pop. | ±% |
|---|---|---|
| 1869 | 696 | — |
| 1880 | 628 | −9.8% |
| 1890 | 582 | −7.3% |
| 1900 | 587 | +0.9% |
| 1910 | 604 | +2.9% |
| 1921 | 590 | −2.3% |
| 1930 | 651 | +10.3% |
| 1950 | 549 | −15.7% |
| 1961 | 582 | +6.0% |
| 1970 | 537 | −7.7% |
| 1980 | 485 | −9.7% |
| 1991 | 432 | −10.9% |
| 2001 | 412 | −4.6% |
| 2011 | 414 | +0.5% |
| 2021 | 453 | +9.4% |
Source: Censuses
