= Kozlovka, Belgorod Oblast =

Kozlovka Козловка
- Selo
- Location within Belgorod Oblast Location within Russia
- Coordinates: 50°24′N 37°49′E
- Country: Russia
- Region: Belgorod Oblast
- District: Volokonovsky District
- Time zone: UTC+3:00

Kozlovka (Russian: Козловка) is a rural locality (a selo) in Volokonovsky District, Belgorod Oblast, Russia. The population was 150 as of 2010. There is 1 street.

== Geography ==
Kozlovka is located 11 km south of Volokonovka (the district's administrative centre) by road. Pyatnitskoye is the nearest rural locality.
