= Kozlovka, Nikolsky District, Vologda Oblast =

Kozlovka Козловка
- Village
- Location within Vologda Oblast Location within Russia
- Coordinates: 59°25′N 45°34′E
- Country: Russia
- Region: Vologda Oblast
- District: Nikolsky District
- Time zone: UTC+3:00

Kozlovka (Russian: Козловка) is a rural locality (a village) in Krasnopolyanskoye Rural Settlement, Nikolsky District, Vologda Oblast, Russia. The population was 116 as of 2002.

== Geography ==
Kozlovka is located 15 km southeast of Nikolsk (the district's administrative centre) by road. Plaksino is the nearest rural locality.
