= Nová Olešná =

- Municipality
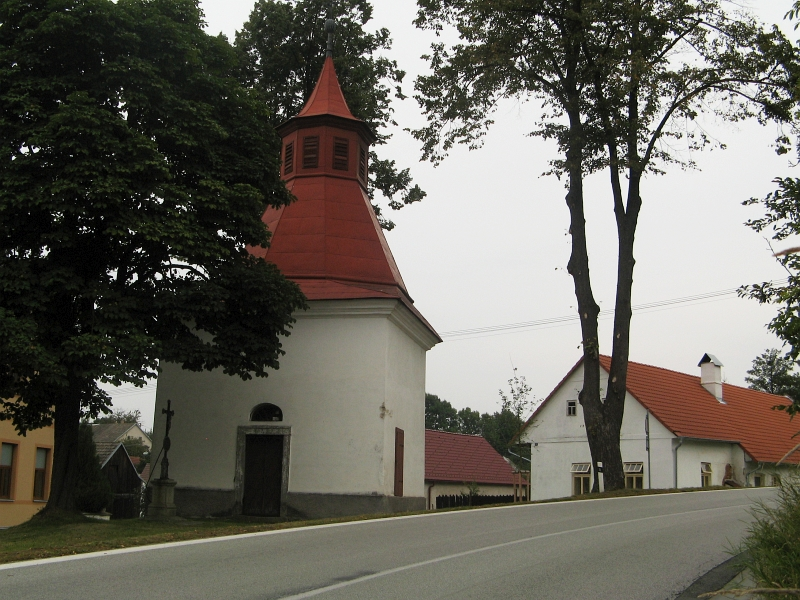
- Chapel of the Holy Trinity

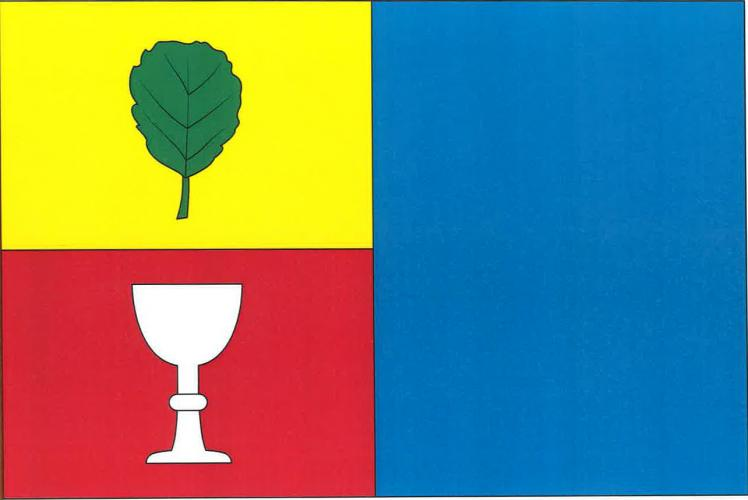
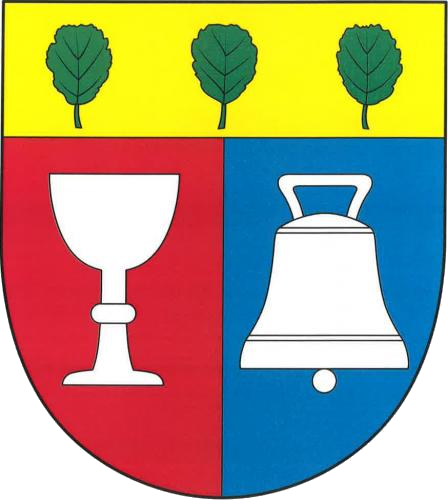
- Flag Coat of arms

- Location in the Czech Republic
- Coordinates: 49°10′32″N 15°9′39″E
- Country: Czech Republic
- Region: South Bohemian
- District: Jindřichův Hradec
- First mentioned: 1379

Area
  - Total: 7.23 km^{2} (2.79 sq mi)
- Elevation: 543 m (1,781 ft)

Population (2026-01-01)
  - Total: 127
  - Density: 17.6/km^{2} (45.5/sq mi)
- Time zone: UTC+1 (CET)
  - Summer (DST): UTC+2 (CEST)
- Postal code: 378 53
- Website: www.novaolesna.cz

Nová Olešná is a municipality and village in Jindřichův Hradec District in the South Bohemian Region of the Czech Republic. It has about 100 inhabitants.

Nová Olešná lies approximately 12 kilometres (7 mi) east of Jindřichův Hradec, 55 km (34 mi) north-east of České Budějovice, and 115 km (71 mi) south-east of Prague.

== Demographics ==
Historical population
Year	Pop.	±%
1869	558	—
1880	543	−2.7%
1890	538	−0.9%
1900	549	+2.0%
1910	567	+3.3%
1921	520	−8.3%
1930	450	−13.5%
1950	303	−32.7%
1961	256	−15.5%
1970	230	−10.2%
1980	190	−17.4%
1991	146	−23.2%
2001	110	−24.7%
2011	109	−0.9%
2021	120	+10.1%
Source: Censuses
