= Kozlovka, Vladimir Oblast =

Kozlovka Козловка
- Village
- Location within Vladimir Oblast Location within Russia
- Coordinates: 56°22′N 41°54′E
- Country: Russia
- Region: Vladimir Oblast
- District: Vyaznikovsky District
- Time zone: UTC+3:00

Kozlovka (Russian: Козловка) is a rural locality (a village) in Mstyora Urban Settlement, Vyaznikovsky District, Vladimir Oblast, Russia. The population was 67 as of 2010. There is 1 street.

== Geography ==
Kozlovka is located 28 km northwest of Vyazniki (the district's administrative centre) by road. Barskoye Tatarovo is the nearest rural locality.
