= Thomas M. Golden =

American judge (1947–2010)

Judge of the United States District Court for the Eastern District of Pennsylvania
- In office June 13, 2006 – July 31, 2010
- Appointed by: George W. Bush
- Preceded by: Franklin Van Antwerpen
- Succeeded by: Jeffrey L. Schmehl

Personal details
- Born: Thomas M. Golden; November 1, 1947 Pottsville, Pennsylvania
- Died: July 31, 2010 (aged 62) Reading, Pennsylvania
- Education: Pennsylvania State University (BA); Dickinson School of Law (JD)

Thomas M. Golden (November 1, 1947 – July 31, 2010) was a United States District Court Judge of the United States District Court for the Eastern District of Pennsylvania.

== Education and career ==
Born in Pottsville, Pennsylvania, he received a Bachelor of Arts degree from Pennsylvania State University in 1969, and a Juris Doctor from Dickinson School of Law (now Pennsylvania State University - Dickinson Law) in 1972. He was in private law practice in Pennsylvania from 1972 to 2006.

== Federal judicial service ==
On January 25, 2006, Golden was nominated by President George W. Bush to become a United States District Judge for the United States District Court for the Eastern District of Pennsylvania, to fill the seat vacated by Franklin Van Antwerpen. He was confirmed by the United States Senate on May 4, 2006, and received his commission on June 13, 2006.

== Death ==
Golden died of cancer on July 31, 2010, in Reading, Pennsylvania.

Legal offices
| Preceded by Franklin Van Antwerpen | Judge of the United States District Court for the Eastern District of Pennsylvania; 2006–2010 | Succeeded by Jeffrey L. Schmehl |
