= Olešná (Havlíčkův Brod District) =

- Municipality
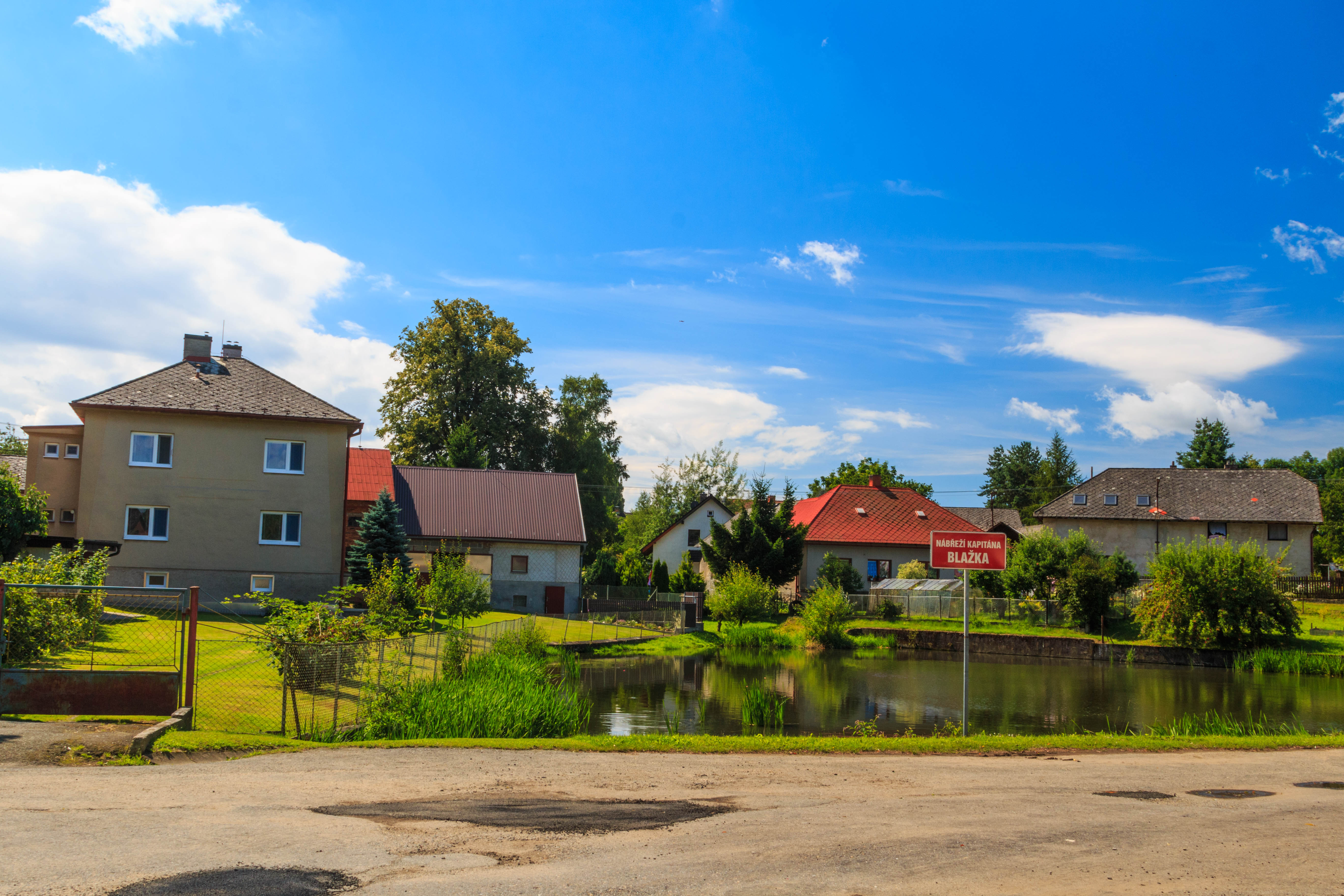
- Pond and houses in the centre of Olešná

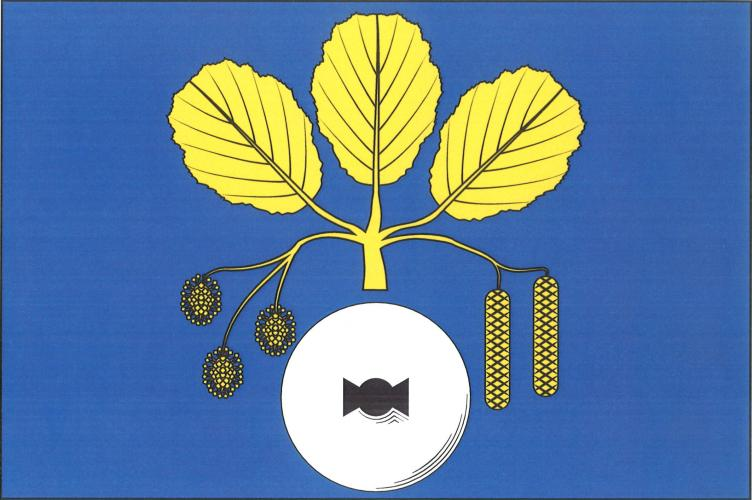
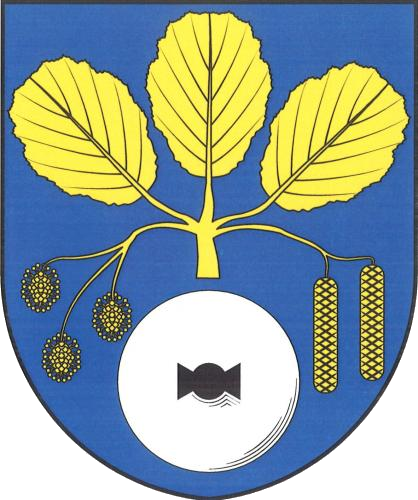
- Flag Coat of arms

- Location in the Czech Republic
- Coordinates: 49°40′54″N 15°32′52″E
- Country: Czech Republic
- Region: Vysočina
- District: Havlíčkův Brod
- First mentioned: 1591

Area
  - Total: 6.78 km^{2} (2.62 sq mi)
- Elevation: 538 m (1,765 ft)

Population (2026-01-01)
  - Total: 373
  - Density: 55.0/km^{2} (142/sq mi)
- Time zone: UTC+1 (CET)
  - Summer (DST): UTC+2 (CEST)
- Postal code: 580 01
- Website: www.obecolesna.cz

Olešná is a municipality and village in Havlíčkův Brod District in the Vysočina Region of the Czech Republic. It has about 400 inhabitants.

Olešná lies approximately 9 kilometres (6 mi) north of Havlíčkův Brod, 32 km (20 mi) north of Jihlava, and 93 km (58 mi) south-east of Prague.

== Demographics ==
Historical population
Year	Pop.	±%
1869	464	—
1880	511	+10.1%
1890	442	−13.5%
1900	443	+0.2%
1910	425	−4.1%
1921	433	+1.9%
1930	376	−13.2%
1950	343	−8.8%
1961	323	−5.8%
1970	286	−11.5%
1980	303	+5.9%
1991	306	+1.0%
2001	302	−1.3%
2011	326	+7.9%
2021	379	+16.3%
Source: Censuses
