= Kozlovka, Pochepsky District, Bryansk Oblast =

Kozlovka Козловка
- Village
- Location within Bryansk Oblast Location within Russia
- Coordinates: 53°05′N 33°12′E
- Country: Russia
- Region: Bryansk Oblast
- District: Pochepsky District
- Time zone: UTC+3:00

Kozlovka (Russian: Козловка) is a rural locality (a village) in Pochepsky District, Bryansk Oblast, Russia. The population was 15 as of 2013. There is 1 street.

== Geography ==
Kozlovka is located 35 km northwest of Pochep (the district's administrative centre) by road. Kozlovsky is the nearest rural locality.
