= Koslov =

Koslov is a surname. Notable people with the surname include:

- Alex Koslov (born 1984), professional wrestler
- Nikolay Koslov, cross country skier
- Vladimir Koslov (born 1958), bobsledder
- Tamar Koslov, Voiced Prunella Deegan in Arthur

Fictional characters:

- Vasili Ivanovich Koslov is the first playable protagonist in Call of Duty 2
- Rabbi Joseph Koslov, from Babylon 5
- Koslov, from Zootopia

== See also ==
- Koslov's pika, a mammal in the family Ochotonidae
- Kozlov, a surname
- Kozlovski, a surname
