= Kozlov (Havlíčkův Brod District) =

- Municipality
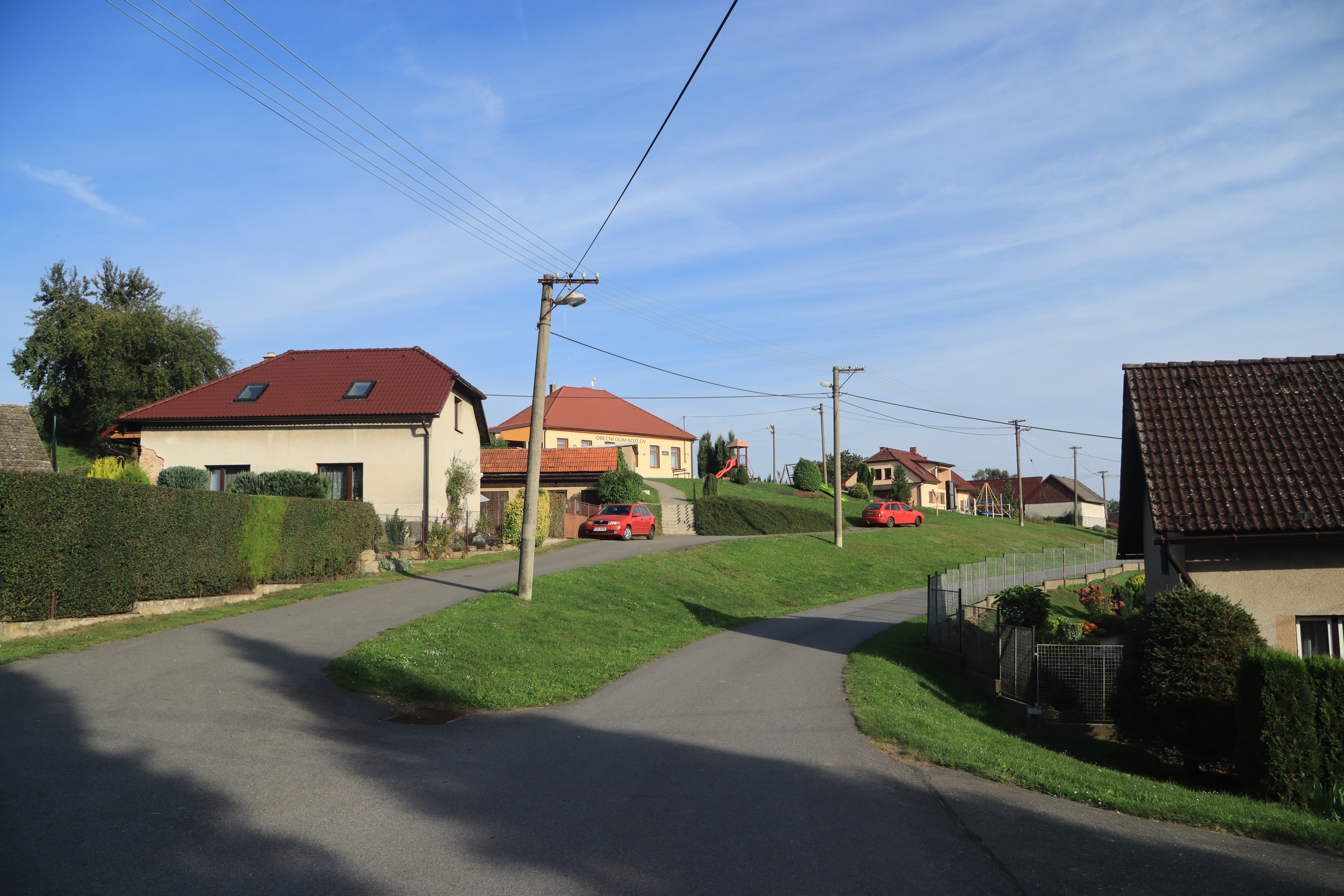
- Houses in Kozlov

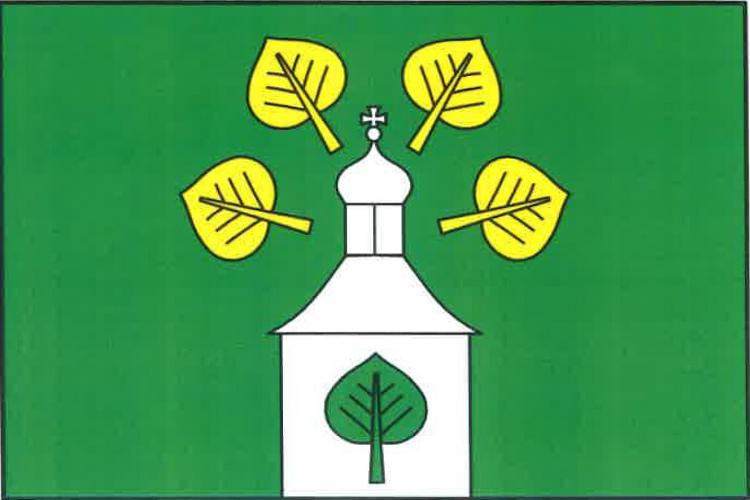
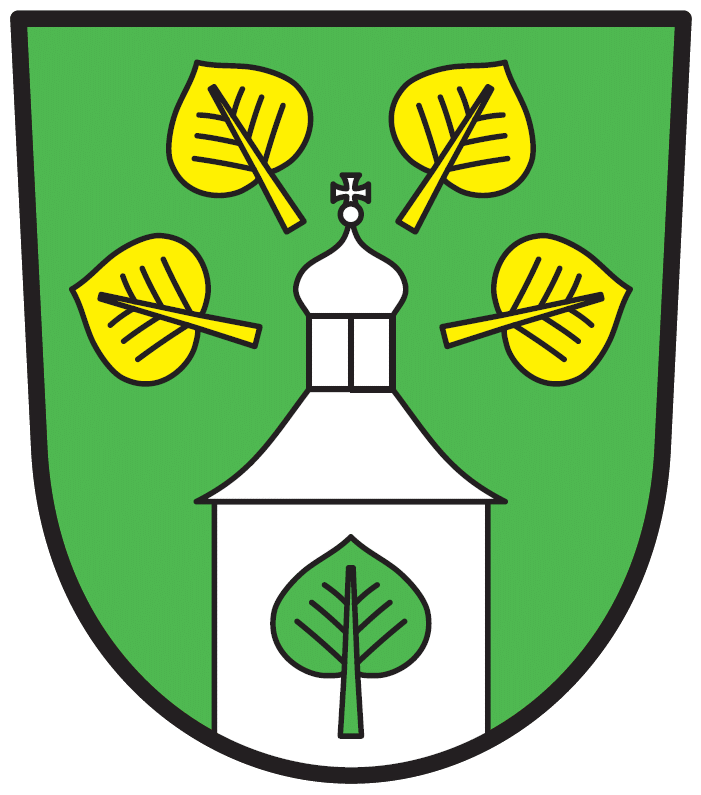
- Flag Coat of arms

- Location in the Czech Republic
- Coordinates: 49°44′5″N 15°17′35″E
- Country: Czech Republic
- Region: Vysočina
- District: Havlíčkův Brod
- First mentioned: 1391

Area
  - Total: 12.66 km^{2} (4.89 sq mi)
- Elevation: 503 m (1,650 ft)

Population (2026-01-01)
  - Total: 226
  - Density: 17.9/km^{2} (46.2/sq mi)
- Time zone: UTC+1 (CET)
  - Summer (DST): UTC+2 (CEST)
- Postal code: 584 01
- Website: www.kozlov-obec.cz

Kozlov is a municipality and village in Havlíčkův Brod District in the Vysočina Region of the Czech Republic. It has about 200 inhabitants.

Kozlov lies approximately 25 kilometres (16 mi) north-west of Havlíčkův Brod, 44 km (27 mi) north-west of Jihlava, and 74 km (46 mi) south-east of Prague.

== Administrative division ==
Kozlov consists of five municipal parts (in brackets population according to the 2021 census):

- Kozlov (81)
- Leština (20)
- Olešná (24)
- Sychrov (4)
- Vrbka (71)

== Demographics ==
Historical population
Year	Pop.	±%
1869	772	—
1880	739	−4.3%
1890	763	+3.2%
1900	744	−2.5%
1910	732	−1.6%
1921	694	−5.2%
1930	632	−8.9%
1950	463	−26.7%
1961	415	−10.4%
1970	368	−11.3%
1980	326	−11.4%
1991	251	−23.0%
2001	223	−11.2%
2011	220	−1.3%
2021	200	−9.1%
Source: Censuses
