= Kozloff Stoudt =

Kozloff Stoudt Attorneys
- Headquarters: Berks County, Pennsylvania
- No. of offices: 2
- No. of attorneys: 20 (2014)
- Major practice areas: Personal injury law, employment law, trust law, municipal law, corporate law, and property law
- Key people: Daniel P. Becker, Managing Partner
- Date founded: 2000
- Founders: David M. Kozloff and Geoffrey M. Stoudt
- Company type: Law Firm, Professional Corporation
- Website: kozloffstoudt.com

Kozloff Stoudt is a Berks County professional corporation located in Wyomissing, Pennsylvania. It is a law firm with approximately twenty attorneys engaging in a wide range of practice in multiple areas of law. The firm has litigated cases at all court levels in Pennsylvania, from the Pennsylvania Court of Common Pleas to the Supreme Court of Pennsylvania. In federal court, Kozloff Stoudt has litigated cases in all three Pennsylvania District Courts, as well as the Court of Appeals for the Third Circuit. The firm has primarily represented clients throughout the Greater areas of Reading and Philadelphia.

== History ==
Kozloff Stoudt was formed in the year 2000 when the law firm Kozloff, Deiner, Payne, and Fegley merged with Rhoda, Stoudt, and Bradley. Since its formation, Kozloff Stoudt has received the local People's Choice Award in Berks County for multiple years. Several of the firm's attorneys received local recognition in Super Lawyers and even the Multi-Million Dollar Advocates Forum.
