= Podlesí (Ústí nad Orlicí District) =

- Municipality
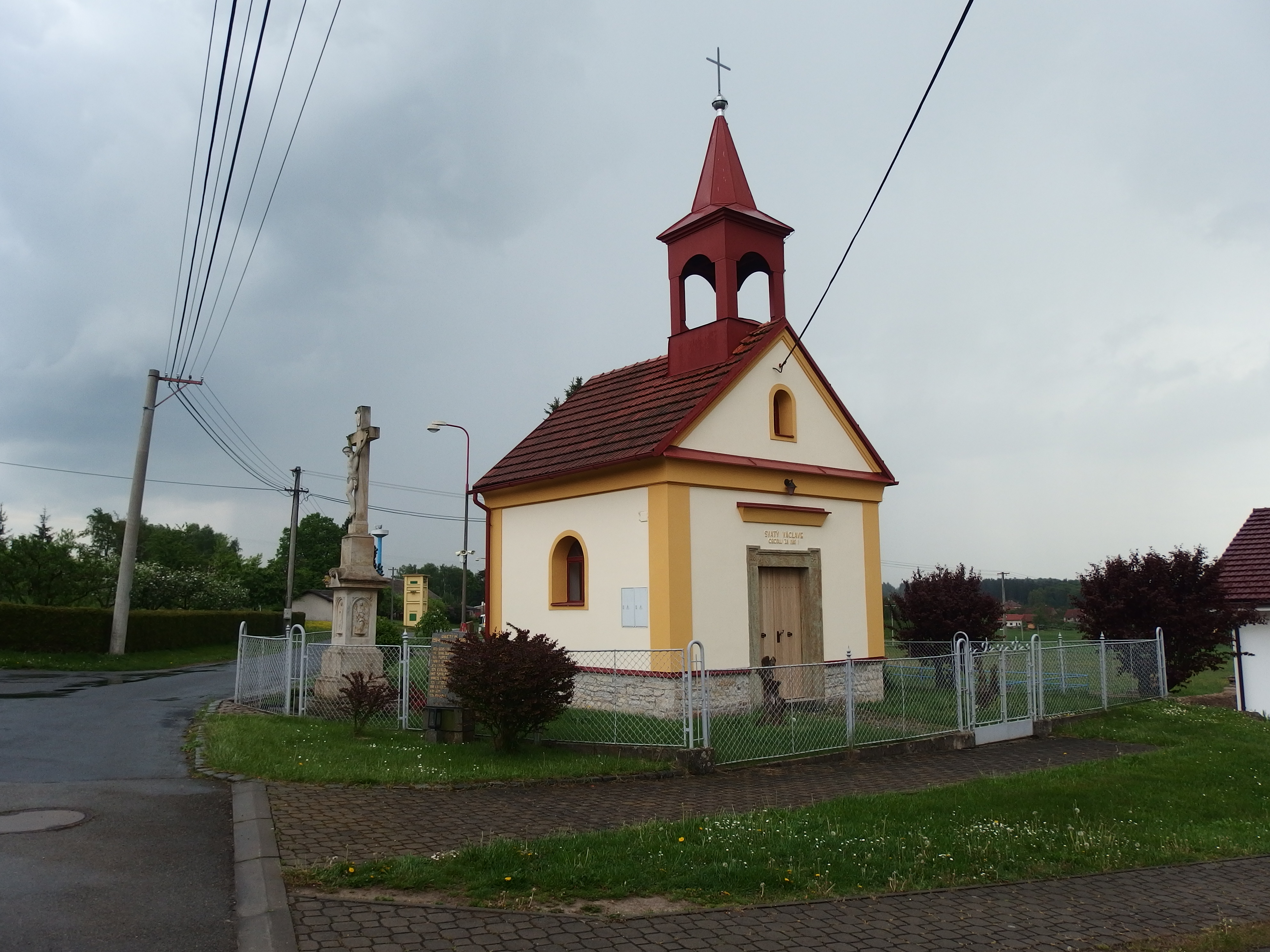
- Chapel of Saint Wenceslaus in Turov

- Location in the Czech Republic
- Coordinates: 50°1′1″N 16°16′53″E
- Country: Czech Republic
- Region: Pardubice
- District: Ústí nad Orlicí
- First mentioned: 1392

Area
  - Total: 3.28 km^{2} (1.27 sq mi)
- Elevation: 405 m (1,329 ft)

Population (2026-01-01)
  - Total: 268
  - Density: 81.7/km^{2} (212/sq mi)
- Time zone: UTC+1 (CET)
  - Summer (DST): UTC+2 (CEST)
- Postal code: 562 01
- Website: www.podlesi.cz

Podlesí is a municipality in Ústí nad Orlicí District in the Pardubice Region of the Czech Republic. It has about 300 inhabitants.

Podlesí lies approximately 10 kilometres (6 mi) north-west of Ústí nad Orlicí, 37 km (23 mi) east of Pardubice, and 134 km (83 mi) east of Prague.

== Administrative division ==
Podlesí consists of three municipal parts (in brackets population according to the 2021 census):

- Němčí (127)
- Olešná (9)
- Turov (122)

== Demographics ==
Historical population
Year	Pop.	±%
1869	376	—
1880	373	−0.8%
1890	360	−3.5%
1900	358	−0.6%
1910	337	−5.9%
1921	314	−6.8%
1930	289	−8.0%
1950	214	−26.0%
1961	238	+11.2%
1970	218	−8.4%
1980	218	+0.0%
1991	214	−1.8%
2001	251	+17.3%
2011	257	+2.4%
2021	258	+0.4%
Source: Censuses
