= Wrisley Brown =

American lawyer (1883–1943)

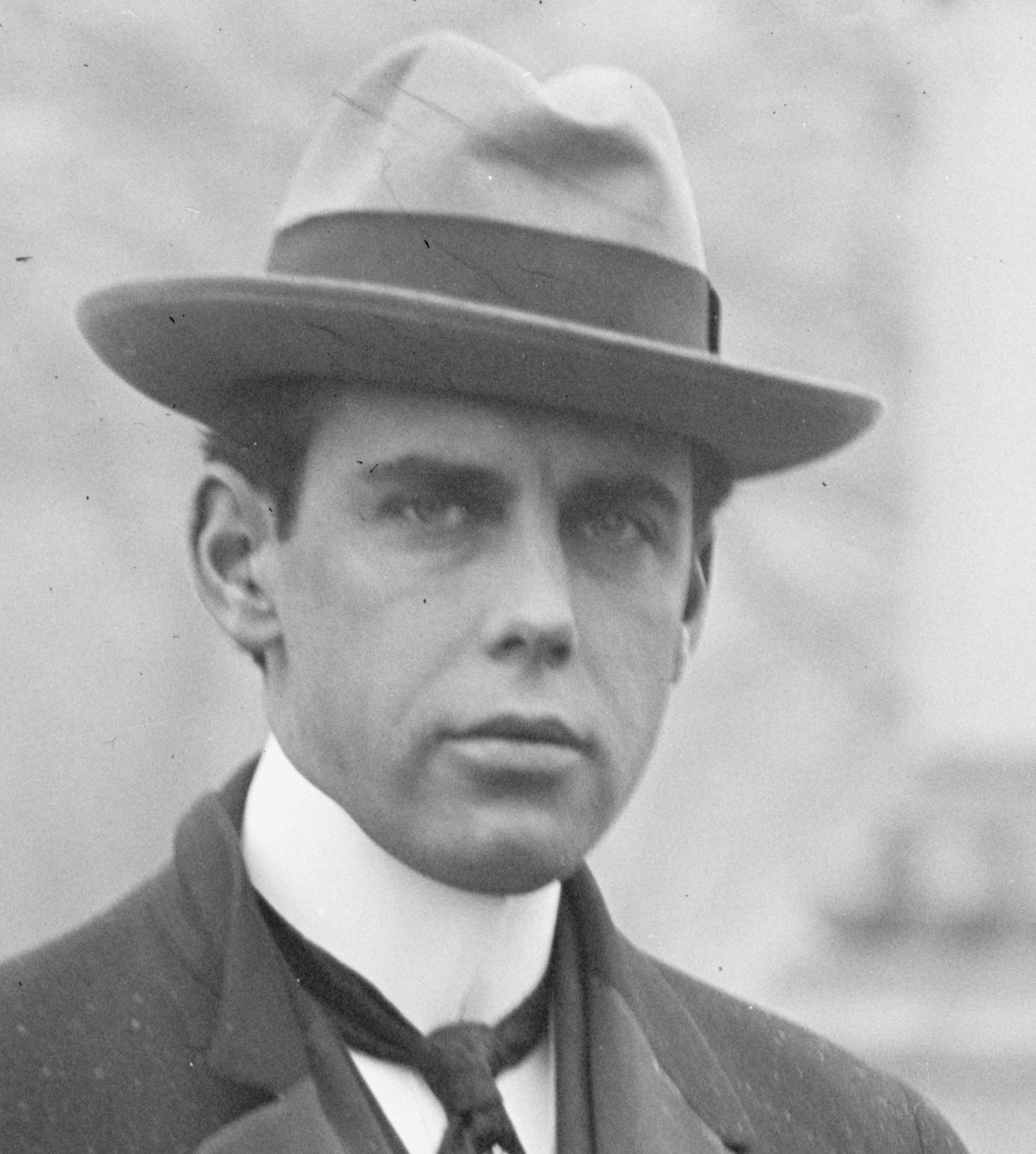
- Born: July 22, 1883
- Died: March 19, 1943 (aged 59); Burial: Arlington National Cemetery
- Occupation: Lawyer

Wrisley Brown (1883–1943) was a Washington, DC lawyer and a soldier.

When Wrisley Brown was born on 22 July 1883, in Washington, District of Columbia, United States, his father, Charles Albert Brown, was 34 and his mother, Mary Louisa Wrisley, was 34. He married Mozelle Price on 3 June 1920, in Manhattan, New York City. He died on 19 March 1943, at the age of 59, and is buried in Arlington National Cemetery, Arlington, Virginia.

In 1911 he served as a special assistant to George W. Wickersham, the United States Attorney General. He ran the investigation that led to the impeachment of Judge Robert W. Archbald of the United States Commerce Court on June 12, 1912.
