= Albert J. Engel =

American politician

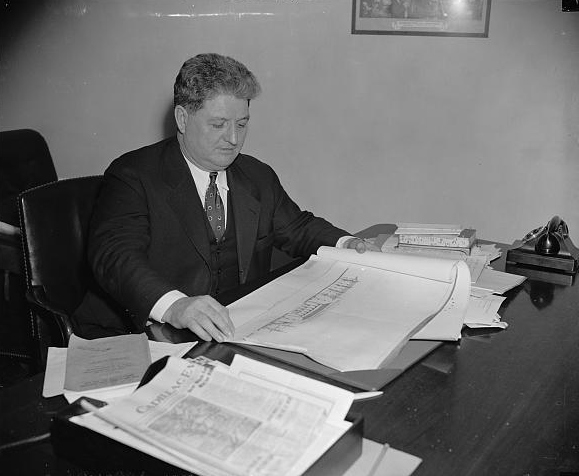
- Republican Rep. Albert J. Engel of Michigan, a critic of Democratic presidential hopeful Paul V. McNutt, studies plans for one of the two "palaces" that McNutt, as High Commissioner to the Philippines, wanted to build as official residences in the islands, April 21, 1938.

Member of the U.S. House of Representatives from Michigan's 9th district
- In office January 3, 1935 – January 3, 1951
- Preceded by: Harry W. Musselwhite
- Succeeded by: Ruth Thompson

Personal details
- Born: January 1, 1888 New Washington, Ohio, U.S.
- Died: December 2, 1959 (aged 71) Grand Rapids, Michigan, U.S.
- Party: Republican
- Children: Albert J. Engel, Jr.
- Education: Central YMCA College; Northwestern University

Military service
- Battles/wars: World War I

Albert Joseph Engel (January 1, 1888 – December 2, 1959) was a politician from the U.S. state of Michigan.

== Biography ==
Engel was born in New Washington, Ohio. He attended the public schools in Grand Traverse County, Michigan, and the Central YMCA College in Chicago, Illinois. He graduated from the law department of Northwestern University, Evanston, Illinois, in 1910. He was admitted to the bar the same year and commenced practice in Lake City, Michigan. He was prosecuting attorney of Missaukee County in 1916, 1917, 1919, and 1920. During World War I, he served as a first lieutenant in the War Department, Washington, D.C., later being promoted to captain and served overseas for twenty-three months, 1917-1919. He served in the Michigan Senate in 1921, 1922, and 1927 to 1932.

In 1934, Engel defeated incumbent Democrat Harry W. Musselwhite to be elected as a Republican from Michigan's 9th congressional district to the 74th to the seven succeeding Congresses, serving from January 3, 1935 – January 3, 1951. He was not a candidate for renomination in 1950, but was an unsuccessful candidate for the Republican gubernatorial nomination.

Engel operated a 1,400-acre (5.7 km^{2}) tree plantation near Lake City. He died in Grand Rapids and is interred in Lake City Cemetery.

Engel's son, Albert J. Engel, Jr., was a judge on the United States Court of Appeals for the Sixth Circuit.

U.S. House of Representatives
Preceded by Harry W. Musselwhite	United States Representative for the 9th congressional district of Michigan; 1935 – 1951	Succeeded by Ruth Thompson
