= Albert Williams Johnson =

American judge (1872–1957)

Judge of the United States District Court for the Middle District of Pennsylvania
- In office May 21, 1925 – June 28, 1945
- Appointed by: Calvin Coolidge
- Preceded by: Charles B. Witmer
- Succeeded by: John W. Murphy

Personal details
- Born: Albert Williams Johnson; November 28, 1872 Weikert, Pennsylvania, U.S.
- Died: March 22, 1957 (aged 84)
- Education: Bucknell University (A.B.) read law

Albert Williams Johnson (November 28, 1872 – March 22, 1957) was a United States district judge of the United States District Court for the Middle District of Pennsylvania.

== Education and career ==
Born in Weikert, Pennsylvania, Johnson received an Artium Baccalaureus degree from Bucknell University in 1896 and read law in that year as well. He was an instructor in law at Bucknell University from 1902 to 1926. He was a member of the Pennsylvania House of Representatives from 1901 to 1902, and was a solicitor for the Borough of Lewisburg and Union County, Pennsylvania from 1908 to 1912. He was Presiding Judge for the 17th Judicial District of Pennsylvania from 1912 to 1922. He was solicitor for the Pennsylvania Department of Education from 1922 to 1923.

== Federal judicial service ==
Johnson received a recess appointment from President Calvin Coolidge on May 21, 1925, to a seat on the United States District Court for the Middle District of Pennsylvania vacated by Judge Charles B. Witmer. He was nominated to the same position by President Coolidge on December 8, 1925. He was confirmed by the United States Senate on December 17, 1925, and received his commission the same day. His service terminated on June 28, 1945, due to his resignation.

== Resignation ==
By 1945, Johnson was under investigation by the United States House Judiciary Committee for misconduct. In unusual language, they found he was a “wicked, evil and mendacious judge.” The report of the subcommittee also said that almost “every litigant who had the misfortune to appear before this wicked and malicious judge became the immediate object of a crooked conspiracy whose sole interest was the amount of money that could be extorted from him for justice or the evasion of justice.” Johnson resigned before impeachment.

== Death ==
Johnson died on March 22, 1957.

== Sources ==
Legal offices
Preceded by Charles B. Witmer	Judge of the United States District Court for the Middle District of Pennsylvania; 1925–1945	Succeeded by John W. Murphy
