= James C. McLaughlin =

American politician

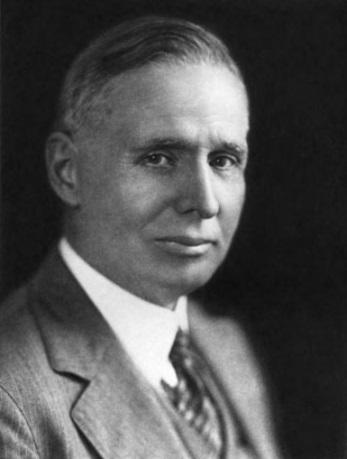
- Frontispiece of 1933's James C. McLaughlin, Late a Representative

Member of the U.S. House of Representatives from Michigan's 9th district
- In office March 4, 1907 – November 29, 1932
- Preceded by: Roswell P. Bishop
- Succeeded by: Harry W. Musselwhite

Personal details
- Born: January 26, 1858 Beardstown, Illinois, U.S.
- Died: November 29, 1932 (aged 74) Marion, Virginia, U.S.
- Party: Republican

James Campbell McLaughlin (January 26, 1858 – November 29, 1932) was a politician from the U.S. state of Michigan.

== Early life ==
McLaughlin was born in Beardstown, Illinois. His parents, David and Isabella (Campbell) McLaughlin, had come from Edinburgh, Scotland, in 1851 and settled in Beardstown. The family moved to Muskegon, Michigan, in 1864, and David became a leading attorney in Muskegon. He served on the Muskegon School Board for 25 years and was the secretary for 19 years.

McLaughlin attended the public schools of Muskegon and graduated from high school in 1876. After a preparatory course, he entered the literary department of the University of Michigan at Ann Arbor in the fall of 1878, but did not graduate. He became an assistant to his father and later worked at a bank. In the summer of 1880, he worked as an office clerk and bookkeeper in a law office, and studied the law. He entered the law department of the University of Michigan in the fall of 1881 and graduated in 1883. In the same year, he was admitted to the bar, and joined his father's law firm in Muskegon.

After his father's death in 1891, he had his own practice until 1899, when he formed the firm, J.C. & J.A. McLaughlin, with a cousin as the junior partner. McLaughlin also succeeded to the abstract business of his father, under the name of Muskegon County Abstract Company. He was also a director of the Enterprize Foundry Company and a director and attorney for the Home Builders & Loan Association, both of Muskegon.

== Political career ==
He served as prosecuting attorney of Muskegon County, 1887–1901. In 1901 was appointed by the Governor of Michigan Aaron T. Bliss as a member of the board of State tax commissioners and State board of assessors, on which he served until 1906. He also served at various times as chairman of the county and city Republican Party committees.

In 1906, McLaughlin was elected as a Republican from Michigan's 9th congressional district to the 60th United States Congress. He was subsequently re-elected to the twelve succeeding Congresses, serving from March 4, 1907, until his death in 1932, just 21 days after losing the November 8 general election to Democrat Harry W. Musselwhite.

== Death ==
McLaughlin died in Marion, Virginia, while en route to Washington, D.C. He is interred in Evergreen Cemetery in Muskegon, Michigan. He was a member of the Masonic Fraternity, the Foresters, Maccabees, and Elks.

His brother, Andrew C. McLaughlin, was a respected scholar of American history.

== See also ==
- List of members of the United States Congress who died in office (1900–1949)

U.S. House of Representatives
Preceded by Roswell P. Bishop	United States Representative for the 9th congressional district of Michigan; 1907 – 1932	Succeeded by Harry W. Musselwhite
