= Jay Hubbell =

American politician (1829–1900)

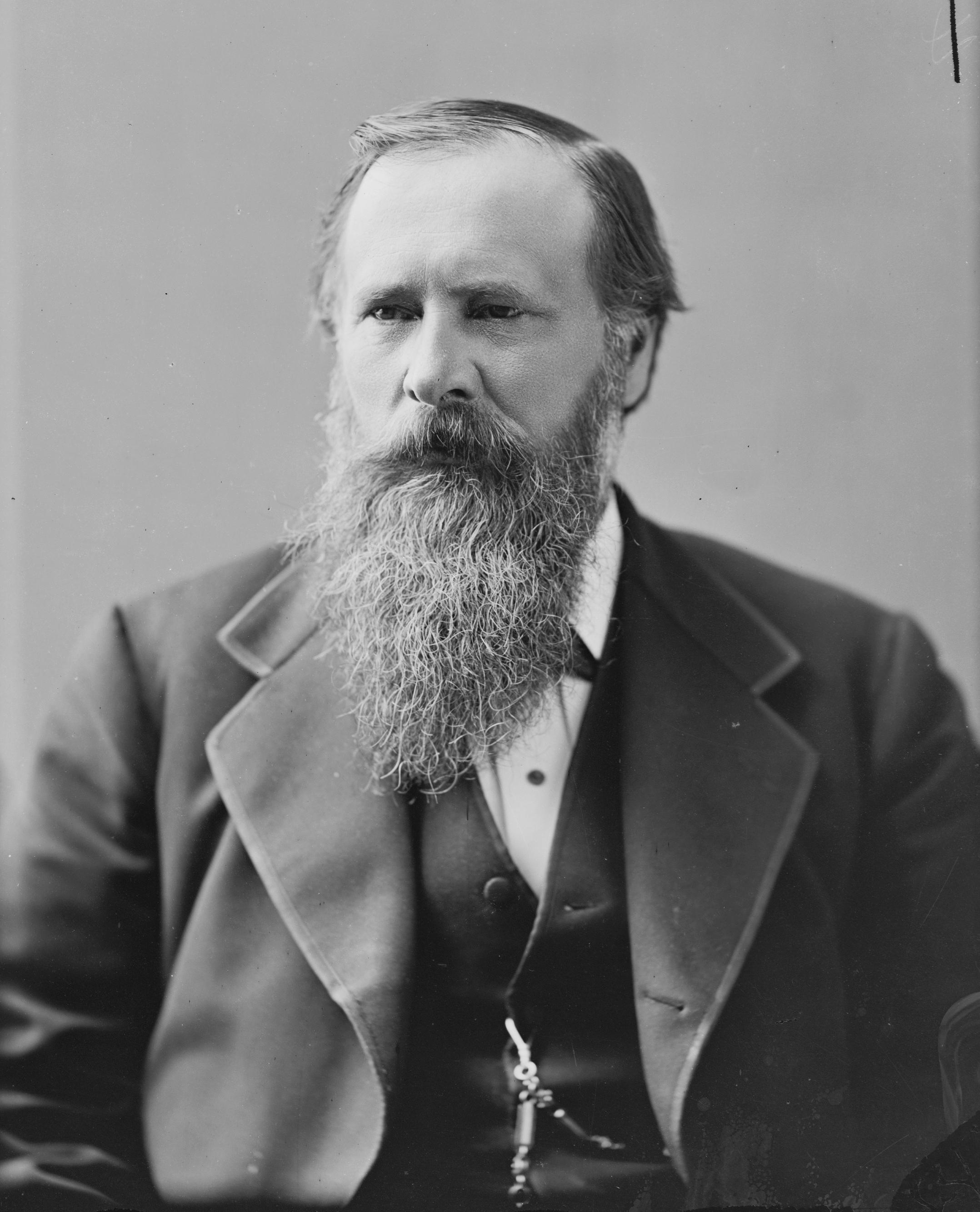
- Hubbell, 1865–1880

Member of the U.S. House of Representatives from Michigan's 9th district
- In office March 4, 1873 – March 3, 1883
- Preceded by: District established
- Succeeded by: Byron M. Cutcheon

Personal details
- Born: Jay Abel Hubbell; September 15, 1829 Rochester Hills, Michigan, U.S.
- Died: October 13, 1900 (aged 71) Houghton, Michigan, U.S.
- Party: Republican
- Education: University of Michigan

Jay Abel Hubbell (September 15, 1829 – October 13, 1900) was a politician and judge from the U.S. state of Michigan, who served as a Republican member of the U.S. House of Representatives.

Hubbell was born in Avon (now Rochester Hills), Michigan. He graduated from the University of Michigan at Ann Arbor in 1853, studied law and was admitted to the bar in 1855. He was elected district attorney of the Upper Peninsula in 1857 and 1859. Two years later, he began serving as prosecuting attorney of Houghton County from 1861 to 1867.

In 1872, Hubbell was elected as a Republican to the 43rd and to the four succeeding Congresses, serving from March 4, 1873, to March 3, 1883, becoming the first to represent Michigan's 9th congressional district. Governor John J. Bagley appointed Hubbell as state commissioner to the 1876 Centennial International Exhibition, in which capacity he collected and prepared the state exhibit of minerals. During the 47th Congress he chaired the Committee on Expenditures in the Department of the Interior.

Hubbell is, perhaps, best known for his creation of the "Grand Army Journal" newspaper. This libelous publication was almost universally denounced. Its sole purpose was to defame Senator Thomas Ferry. Ferry was a powerful Senator who was well regarded in Michigan and across the country. Hubbell sought (unsuccessfully) to take his place in the Senate by throwing slanderous headlines in his "Journal" which he mailed out by the thousands.

After leaving Congress, he served in the Michigan Senate from 1885 to 1887, was a presidential elector for Michigan in the 1892 election, and served as circuit judge of the twelfth judicial circuit from 1894 until his resignation in 1899. He died in Houghton, Michigan, and is interred there at Forest Hill Cemetery.

Hubbell is the figure most responsible for getting the state legislature to establish a school of mines for the training of mine engineers in Houghton. Hubbell donated land for the school's first buildings in 1885. The school of mines eventually expanded into Michigan Technological University.

Jay Abel Hubbell is the eponym of Hubbell, an unincorporated community in Houghton County.

== Notes ==
U.S. House of Representatives
Preceded by None	United States Representative for the 9th congressional district of Michigan; 1873 – 1883	Succeeded by Byron M. Cutcheon
