= John W. Moon =

American politician

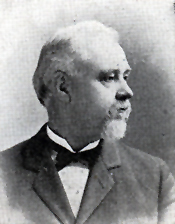
- From 1893's The House of Representatives of the Fifty Third Congress by The Graphic Chicago.

Member of the U.S. House of Representatives from Michigan's 9th district
- In office March 4, 1893 – March 3, 1895
- Preceded by: Harrison H. Wheeler
- Succeeded by: Roswell P. Bishop

Personal details
- Born: January 18, 1836 Wayne County, Michigan, U.S.
- Died: April 5, 1898 (aged 62) Muskegon, Michigan, U.S.
- Party: Republican

John Wesley Moon (January 18, 1836 – April 5, 1898) was a politician from the U.S. state of Michigan.

Moon was born in Wayne County, Michigan, near Ypsilanti, and attended the common schools. As a youth, he worked on a farm and attended school during the winter. In 1852, he moved to Jackson County and left there in the fall of 1854 to work in lumber camps and saw mills on the Flat River in central Michigan. In the spring of 1856, he settled in Muskegon County, Michigan, and engaged in the manufacture of lumber and in banking. He was a partner in the firm of A.V. Mann & Co., which established a mill at Lakeside (now a part of the city of Muskegon). He held the offices of supervisor, township treasurer, and president of the then village of Muskegon.

He served in the Michigan Senate in 1885, from the 23rd district, and in 1887, from the 21st district. Also in 1887, he was elected president of the Muskegon Savings Bank. A few years later, in 1891, he became a member of the board of education of Muskegon.

In 1892, Moon was elected as a Republican from Michigan's 9th congressional district to the 53rd Congress, defeating incumbent Democrat Harrison H. Wheeler. Moon served from March 4, 1893, to March 3, 1895, and was not a candidate for re-nomination in 1894.

After leaving Congress, John W. Moon resumed his former business activities. He died in Muskegon and is interred there at Evergreen Cemetery.

U.S. House of Representatives
Preceded by Harrison H. Wheeler	United States Representative for the 9th congressional district of Michigan; 1893 – 1895	Succeeded by Roswell P. Bishop
