= Charles B. Witmer =

American judge (1862–1925)

Judge of the United States District Court for the Middle District of Pennsylvania
- In office March 2, 1911 – April 7, 1925
- Appointed by: William Howard Taft
- Preceded by: Robert W. Archbald
- Succeeded by: Albert Williams Johnson

Personal details
- Born: Charles B. Witmer; April 18, 1862 Northumberland County, Pennsylvania, U.S.
- Died: April 7, 1925 (aged 62)
- Education: Central Penn College (A.B.) read law

Charles B. Witmer (April 18, 1862 – April 7, 1925) was a United States district judge of the United States District Court for the Middle District of Pennsylvania.

== Education and career ==
Born in Northumberland County, Pennsylvania, Witmer obtained an Artium Baccalaureus degree from Central Pennsylvania Business School (now Central Penn College) in 1883. Subsequently, he pursued a legal career, gaining admission to the bar in 1887. Witmer served as the county solicitor for Northumberland County during two distinct periods, spanning from 1888 to 1891 and then again from 1894 to 1900. His legal expertise extended to the national stage when he assumed the role of Assistant Attorney General for the Spanish Treaty Claims Commission from 1902 to 1904. Following this, Witmer dedicated his skills as chief counsel for the Pennsylvania Dairy Food Commission from 1904 to 1905, and later as a special counsel to the Pennsylvania Auditor General's Department from 1905 to 1906. In 1906, he held the position of United States Marshal for the Middle District of Pennsylvania before assuming the role of United States Attorney for the same district from 1907 to 1911.

== Federal judicial service ==
On February 20, 1911, Witmer was nominated by President William Howard Taft to a seat on the United States District Court for the Middle District of Pennsylvania vacated by the impeachment and conviction of Judge Robert W. Archbald. Witmer was confirmed by the United States Senate on March 2, 1911, and received his commission the same day. Witmer served in that capacity until his death on April 7, 1925.

== Sources ==
Legal offices
Preceded by Robert W. Archbald	Judge of the United States District Court for the Middle District of Pennsylvania; 1911–1925	Succeeded by Albert Williams Johnson
