= J. Weldon Jones =

American administrator and diplomat

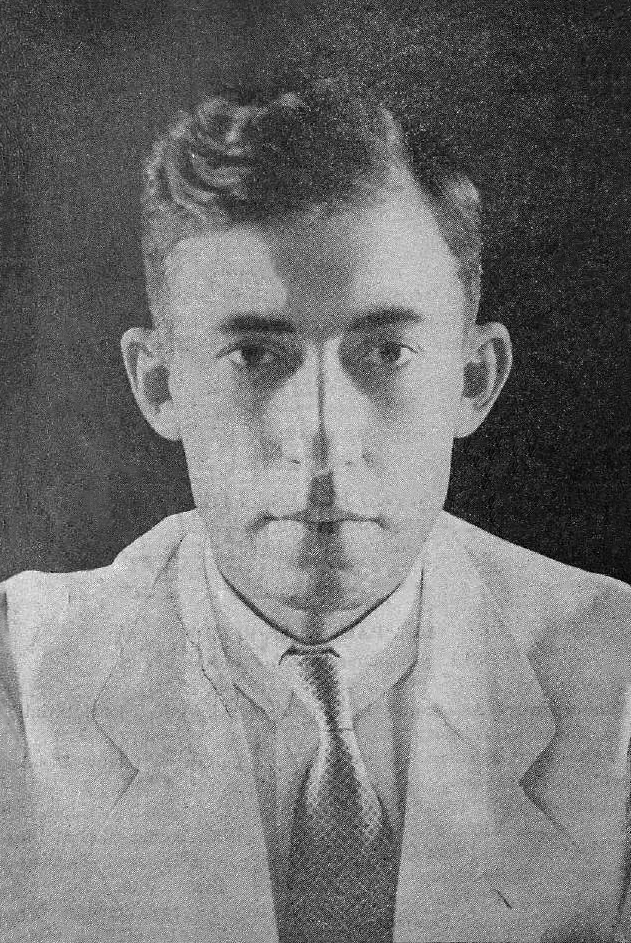
- James Weldon Jones, c. 1939

Acting High Commissioner to the Philippines
- In office January 1, 1937 – July 12, 1937
- Preceded by: Frank Murphy
- Succeeded by: Paul V. McNutt
- In office July 12, 1939 – October 27, 1939
- Preceded by: Paul V. McNutt
- Succeeded by: Francis Bowes Sayre Sr.

Personal details
- Born: February 28, 1896 Copeville, Texas, U.S.
- Died: November 24, 1982 (aged 86) Harris County, Texas, U.S.

James Weldon Jones (February 28, 1896 – November 24, 1982) was an American administrator and acting High Commissioner to the Philippines.

Jones was born in Copeville, Texas, in Collin County. He went to Baylor University. Jones served in the United States Army during World War I. He served as the Insular Auditor and Financial Adviser to the High Commissioner to the Philippines from 1934 to 1940. Jones served as acting High Commissioner to the Philippines in 1937 and 1939. He then served as assistant director of the Bureau of the Budget from 1941 to 1955. Jones died in Harris County, Texas, aged 86.
