= Paul V. McNutt =

American diplomat and politician (1891–1955)

Paul McNutt
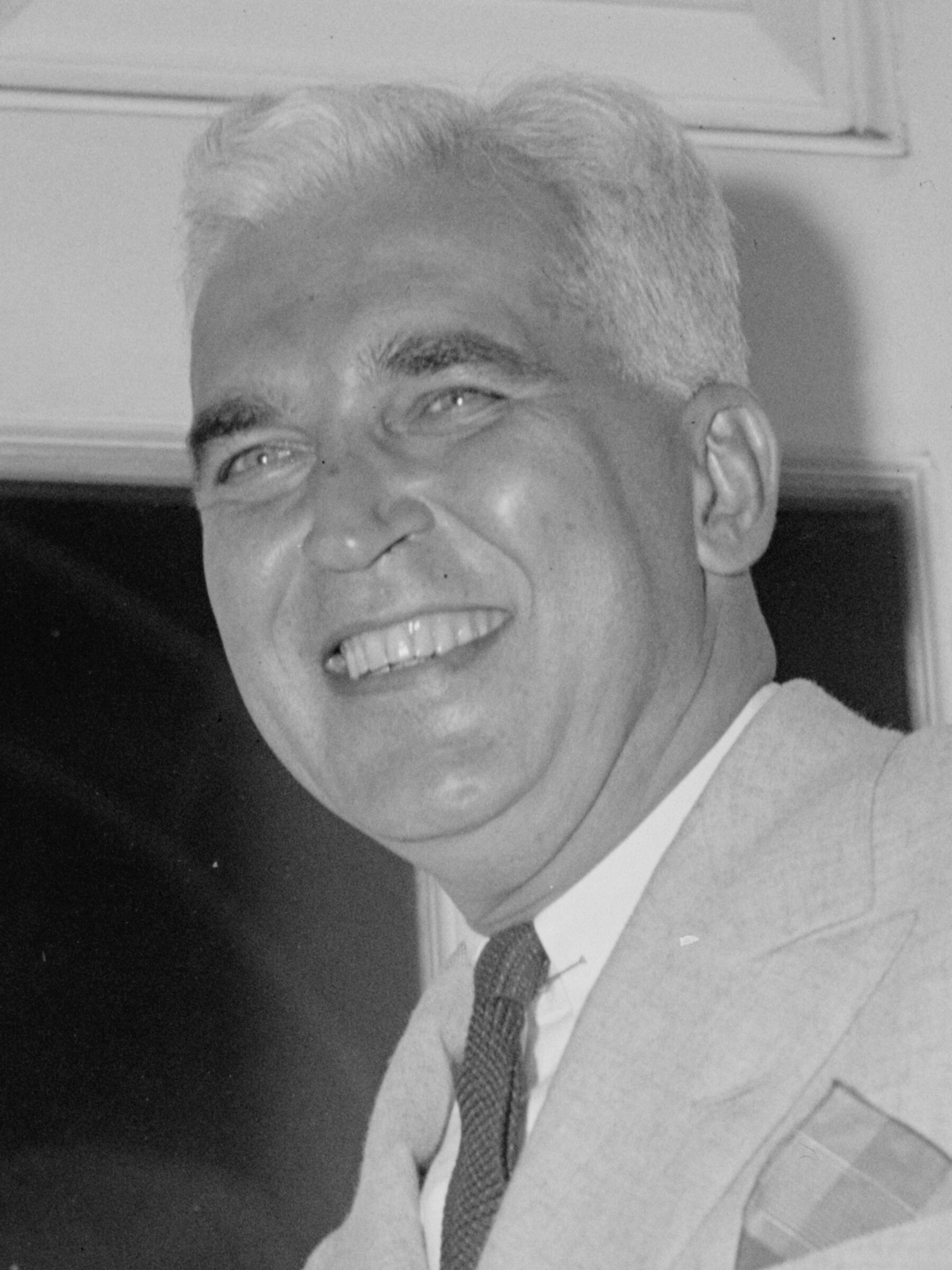
- McNutt in 1939

1st United States Ambassador to the Philippines
- In office July 4, 1946 – March 22, 1947
- President: Harry S. Truman
- Preceded by: Himself (High Commissioner)
- Succeeded by: Emmet O'Neal

2nd and 5th High Commissioner to the Philippines
- In office September 14, 1945 – July 4, 1946
- President: Harry S. Truman
- Preceded by: Harold L. Ickes
- Succeeded by: Himself (Ambassador)
- In office April 26, 1937 – July 12, 1939
- President: Franklin D. Roosevelt
- Preceded by: J. Weldon Jones (acting)
- Succeeded by: J. Weldon Jones (acting)

Chair of the War Manpower Commission
- In office April 18, 1942 – September 14, 1945
- President: Franklin D. Roosevelt; Harry S. Truman
- Preceded by: Position established
- Succeeded by: Position abolished

1st Administrator of the Federal Security Agency
- In office July 12, 1939 – September 14, 1945
- President: Franklin D. Roosevelt; Harry S. Truman
- Preceded by: Position established
- Succeeded by: Watson B. Miller

34th Governor of Indiana
- In office January 9, 1933 – January 11, 1937
- Lieutenant: M. Clifford Townsend
- Preceded by: Harry G. Leslie
- Succeeded by: M. Clifford Townsend

Chair of the National Governors Association
- In office June 2, 1934 – November 16, 1936
- Preceded by: James Rolph
- Succeeded by: George C. Peery

Personal details
- Born: Paul Vories McNutt; July 19, 1891 Franklin, Indiana, U.S.
- Died: March 24, 1955 (aged 63) New York City, U.S.
- Party: Democratic
- Spouse: Kathleen Timolat (m. 1918)
- Education: Indiana University, Bloomington (BA); Harvard University (LLB)

Military service
- Branch: United States Army
- Years of service: 1917–1919
- Rank: Colonel
- Wars: World War I
- Awards: World War I Victory Medal

Paul Vories McNutt (July 19, 1891 – March 24, 1955) was an American diplomat and politician who served as the 34th governor of Indiana, high commissioner to the Philippines, administrator of the Federal Security Agency, chairman of the War Manpower Commission and ambassador to the Philippines.

== Early life and education ==
Paul Vories McNutt was born in Franklin, Indiana, on July 19, 1891, the only child of John C. and Ruth McNutt. Both his parents were school teachers when they met, but his father began practicing law just before he was born. The family moved to Indianapolis in 1893 where his father had become librarian of the Indiana Supreme Court. McNutt was enrolled in public school in the city and attended for two years. In 1898 his father resigned his position and they moved again to Martinsville where he opened a law office. McNutt was moved to a local school where he attended until graduation.

In 1909, McNutt entered Indiana University where he was active in campus politics, acted in student theater productions and was a close friend and Beta Theta Pi fraternity brother of Wendell Willkie, future Republican candidate for president of the United States who, like McNutt, was then a Democrat. After graduating from Indiana in 1913, McNutt went to Harvard Law School where he became a member of Acacia fraternity as well as taking an extracurricular job as a United Press reporter and sports writer. McNutt took his law degree from Harvard in 1916, then returned to Martinsville where in a race for Morgan County prosecutor he was narrowly defeated.

== Career ==
=== Academics ===
The following year he took a job as assistant professor at the Indiana University School of Law, but quit to join the United States Army when the United States entered World War I. McNutt completed officer candidate school at Fort Benjamin Harrison, and received his commission in the field artillery branch. He was assigned to provide instruction in field artillery skills, and served at Camp Travis, Kelly Field, and Camp Stanley, Texas, and Fort Jackson, South Carolina. While in Texas, he met and married his wife, Kathleen. He was discharged as a major in 1919, and later joined the reserves, where he rose to the rank of colonel.

After leaving active military service, McNutt returned to his law school teaching job, becoming a full professor in 1920 and then, in 1925, the youngest dean in the school's history. He skillfully used both his university connections and his wartime experience to launch his political career. As law school dean, he forcefully attacked pacifists and opponents of compulsory military training on college campuses. He had since returning from the war been active in the American Legion, an influential veterans' organization, and spoke frequently throughout the state. In 1927, he was elected commander of the Indiana department of the American Legion. His group's lobbying brought him contact with many state leaders which began his interest in politics and began building a political base of support.

=== Politics ===
==== Indiana ====
McNutt became chairman of the state party and led the Indiana delegation to the Democratic National Convention in 1932. Up until the last ballot, he and the delegation refused to support the nomination of Franklin D. Roosevelt for president. McNutt was dismissive and rude to Roosevelt when he came to personally ask for their support. Roosevelt never forgot the slight, and from then on in private he referred to McNutt as "that platinum blond S.O.B from Indiana."

The same year, Indiana's Democrats nominated McNutt for governor at the state convention. In the general campaign he focused his attacks on Republicans by blaming them for doing too little to resolve the problems of the Great Depression. His campaign created the first political club for supporters in the United States. Members could join for a small fee with the contributions going to the campaign. The idea became popular and is now employed in many campaigns nationwide. He won easily, swept along in that year's national Democratic landslide led by Franklin D. Roosevelt. The Democrats swept the Indiana General Assembly as well, taking 91 out of 100 house seats, and 43 of the 50 senate seats.

McNutt was a forceful and controversial governor. With an overwhelming Democratic majority in the legislature, he completely reorganized state government with the passage of the Executive Reorganization Act. The act effectively rolled back over fifty years of restrictions the legislation had placed on the governor in appointing officials and having control over policy, giving him a measure of control over the more independent branches of the administration, and also granting new and expanded powers to the Lieutenant Governor of Indiana.

To remedy the state funding problem, he was able to have constitutional amendments passed that legalized a gross income tax. Previously almost all state revenue had come from property tax which fell disproportionately on farmers and rural citizens, although by the 1920s the majority of Indiana's citizens lived in urban areas. In the city, most people owned much less property, leading few city dwellers to pay any taxes at all. To provide another source of revenue, he advocated creating a state-issued franchise license, so that licensees would be the only business that could sell liquor in the state. The General Assembly approved and legalized beer and wine sales in the store in anticipation of the repeal of federal prohibition. The revenue increases had the desired effect and balanced the state budget and paid off the $3.4 million debt created during World War I. He left office with state possessing a $17 million surplus.

Ideologically liberal, McNutt was very involved in joining the state to the new federal welfare programs. Legislation was passed to allow the state to participate in Social Security and worker's unemployment programs. Additionally, he was most active in pursuing federal jobs and created the administrative framework necessary for Indiana to participate in the Works Progress Administration programs. More than 75,000 Hoosiers were working in the government program before he left office. This created a massive patronage system that made McNutt one of the most powerful governors in the state's history.

McNutt earned the reputation of an old-style machine politician by using the reorganization of state government to oust his opponents, both Republican and Democratic, from state jobs and by forcing state employees to pay two percent of their salaries to the Indiana Democratic Party. The "Two Percent" club scandals would hinder McNutt's chances of obtaining a place on the 1940 and 1944 national tickets. The system for exclusive franchises for beer distribution were sold to his campaign contributors who in turn made large donations to him and the party. He also had the legislature postpone the 1933 municipal elections as a cost-saving measure, adding an extra year to the terms of local officials, a majority of whom were Democrats. McNutt took up the cause of getting John Dillinger paroled from the Michigan City State Penitentiary. He submitted a false record of Dillinger's criminal and prison activities and excluded two letters from law enforcers. Dillinger was granted clemency and later was named the first "Public Enemy Number One."

McNutt also took up the cause of welfare reform. The new welfare laws passed effectively made charitable giving by the government an entirely state level controlled operation. Previously, local governments had been in charge of identifying needs and carrying out relief. McNutt began his term with the support of several key labor groups, but soon lost that support. Although McNutt's administration curtailed the use of court injunctions to prevent labor picketing, McNutt did not hesitate to declare martial law in eleven coal-mining counties where major violence accompanied union efforts to organize the miners. In all, McNutt called out the Indiana National Guard three times in response to labor-related violence.

In the 1934 mid-term elections, Republicans gained seats in both houses of the General Assembly and narrowed the Democratic majority. They began an attempt to rein in McNutt's power by creating a merit system to limit McNutt's control of the current patronage system. Publicly, McNutt supported the legislation, but once enacted it had very little effect on the operation of the government as many parts were simply ignored. Over time though, the system was gradually implemented in some state bureaus.

==== Federal government ====
Indiana's constitution kept McNutt from seeking reelection as governor in 1936, and he launched a bid to be nominated to run for president on the Democratic ticket. He was considered the front-runner until Roosevelt announced he would seek a second term. McNutt was overwhelmingly defeated, but attempted to be nominated for vice president. Roosevelt, however, still recalled McNutt's lack of support in his previous reelection bid and refused to accept him. Despite the rejection, McNutt campaigned strongly for Roosevelt's reelection as president. Roosevelt made him High Commissioner to the Philippines in 1937, a post that McNutt thought would help him in a presidential bid in 1940 and which Roosevelt, contemplating a third term for himself, thought would effectively sideline McNutt.

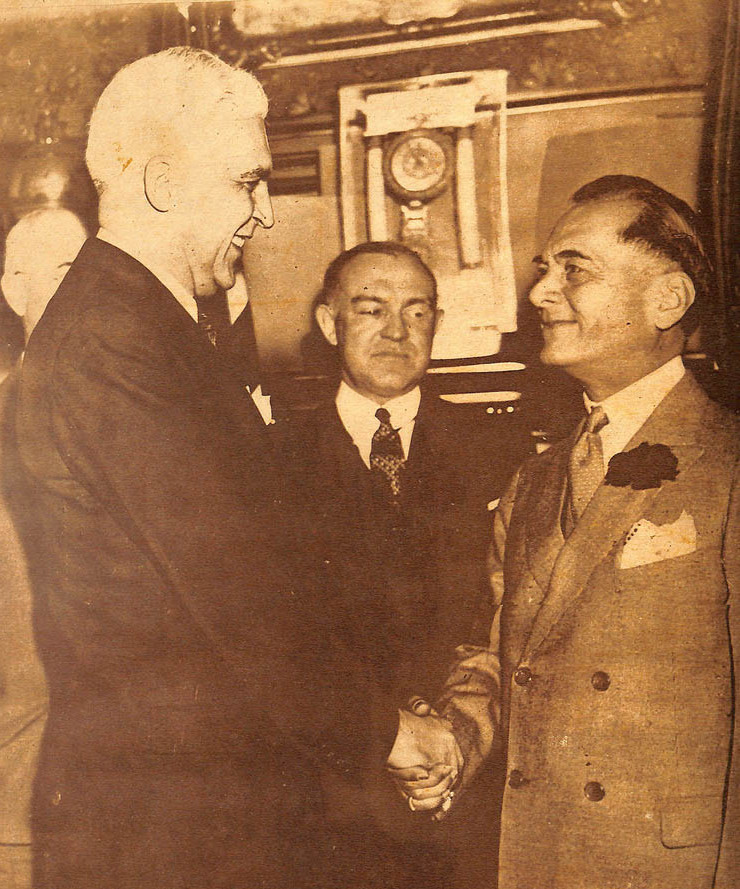
McNutt (left) being congratulated by President Manuel Quezon on his appointment as High Commissioner in 1937

With the Philippines largely self-governing, the post of high commissioner was mostly ceremonial. Nevertheless, McNutt managed to stir controversy by appearing fussy over details of protocol. He also questioned the wisdom of giving early independence to the islands as promised in the 1934 Tydings–McDuffie Act, believing that the small country could not defend itself. McNutt was also the target of criticism from Republicans, notably Representative Albert J. Engel of Michigan, for a proposal to construct a "summer palace" in the mountains near Baguio.

In a notable humanitarian act, McNutt, in cooperation with Commonwealth President Manuel L. Quezon, quietly side-stepped the US Department of State in allowing the entry into the Philippines of 1,300 Jewish refugees fleeing fascist regimes in Europe. This was at a time when the refugees could not legally enter the United States itself in large numbers. McNutt's role was documented in the 2013 film Rescue in the Philippines: Refuge from the Holocaust.

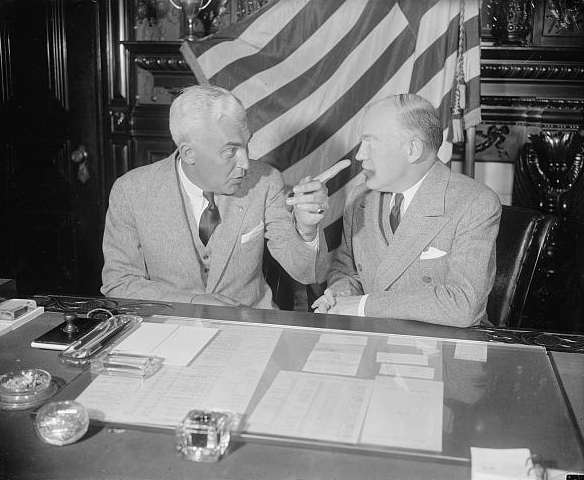
Paul V. McNutt (left), High Commissioner to the Philippines, gestures at Secretary of War Harry H. Woodring during an official visit to Washington in 1938.

By 1938 the press speculated that McNutt would, despite opposition from Roosevelt supporters, "have to be reckoned with" for the 1940 Democratic nomination for president because of his military and American Legion service, gubernatorial record, and "astonishingly good looks." He left the Philippines in 1939 to become head of Roosevelt's new Federal Security Agency, an umbrella office that managed an array of New Deal programs that ranged from the Civilian Conservation Corps to Social Security. It also served as a cover agency from 1942 to 1944 for the War Research Service, a secret program to develop chemical and biological weapons. The FSA job gave McNutt high visibility, but his presidential hopes ended because Roosevelt decided to seek a third term. Although McNutt's name was floated as a possible vice presidential running mate, Roosevelt apparently did not seriously consider the possibility, preferring the more liberal Secretary of Agriculture Henry A. Wallace. Coincidentally, Roosevelt's opponent in 1940 was McNutt's Indiana University classmate and Beta Theta Pi fraternity brother Wendell Willkie, now a Republican.

=== Later years ===
McNutt loyally supported Roosevelt in 1940 and was given added responsibilities at the FSA in managing defense-related health and safety programs. In 1942, Roosevelt appointed him chairman of the War Manpower Commission, which was charged with planning to balance the labor needs of agriculture, industry and the armed forces, but the position carried little real power. While in this capacity, McNutt publicly urged "the extermination of the Japanese in toto". When asked for clarification, McNutt indicated that he was referring to the Japanese people as a whole—not just the Japanese military—"for I know the Japanese people." In a further qualification one week after the original statement, McNutt stated that the comments reflected his personal views and not official U.S. government policy.

McNutt was among 12 nominated at the 1944 Democratic National Convention to serve as Roosevelt's running mate in the presidential election that year, receiving one vote. After Japan's surrender in 1945, President Harry S. Truman sent him back to the Philippines for a second tour as high commissioner. Following Philippine independence on July 4, 1946, McNutt served as America's first ambassador to the islands, a post he left in 1947 to take up law practice in New York City and Washington, D.C. After serving as ambassador, he also chaired the Philippine-American Trade Council, a business organization, and was a director of several firms in Manila. McNutt's prominence was demonstrated by his appearance on the covers of Life and Time magazines in 1939 when he returned from the Philippines, and on a Time cover in 1942 when he took the chair of the War Manpower Commission.

In 1950, McNutt became chairman of the board of United Artists Corporation. His involvement with the company was short-lived, as he and his management team stepped aside in favor of Arthur B. Krim and Robert Benjamin within less than a year.

== Personal life and death ==
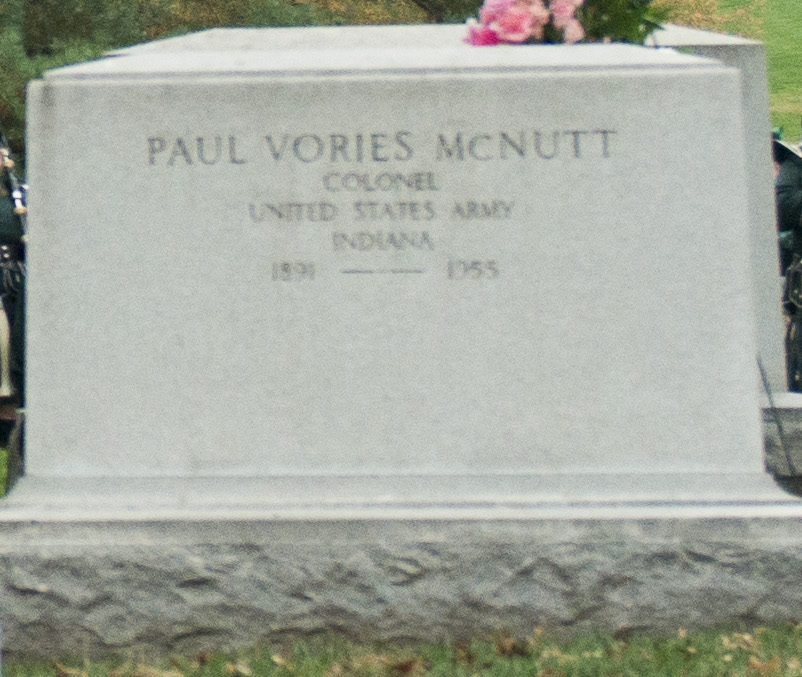
Gravestone of Paul Vories McNutt in Arlington National Cemetery, 2015

While in Texas, he met and married his wife, Kathleen. He was discharged as a major in 1919, and later joined the reserves, where he rose to the rank of colonel.

McNutt fell ill in 1955 and decided to travel on a cruise to the Philippines to recover in the warm climate after a surgery. His condition only worsened and after arriving in Manila he flew to New York for better care. He died March 24, 1955, in New York City, aged 63, and is buried in Arlington National Cemetery.

Paul V. McNutt Quadrangle, a residence hall complex at Indiana University Bloomington, is named for him and has a bust of him in the front foyer of the main building.

== See also ==
- List of governors of Indiana

Non-profit organization positions
Preceded by Edward E. Spafford	National Commander of the American Legion; 1928–1929	Succeeded by O. L. Bodenhamer
Party political offices
Preceded by Frank Dailey	Democratic nominee for Governor of Indiana; 1932	Succeeded by M. Clifford Townsend
Political offices
Preceded by Harry G. Leslie	Governor of Indiana; 1933–1937	Succeeded by M. Clifford Townsend
Preceded by James Rolph	Chair of the National Governors Association; 1934–1936	Succeeded by George C. Peery
New office	Administrator of the Federal Security Agency; 1939–1945	Succeeded by Watson B. Miller
Diplomatic posts
Preceded by J. Weldon Jones; Acting	High Commissioner to the Philippines; 1937–1939	Succeeded by Francis Sayre
Vacant Title last held by Francis Sayre	High Commissioner to the Philippines; 1945–1946	Succeeded by Himself as United States Ambassador to the Philippines
Preceded by Himself as High Commissioner to the Philippines	United States Ambassador to the Philippines; 1946–1947	Succeeded by Emmet O'Neal
Government offices
New office	Chair of the War Manpower Commission; 1942–1945	Position abolished
