= Harrison H. Wheeler =

American politician

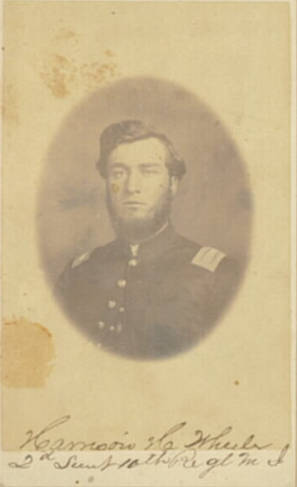
- Portrait of Harrison H. Wheeler

Member of the U.S. House of Representatives from Michigan's 9th district
- In office March 4, 1891 – March 3, 1893
- Preceded by: Byron M. Cutcheon
- Succeeded by: John W. Moon

Member of the Michigan Senate from the 24th district
- In office 1873–1874

Member of the Michigan Senate from the 27th district
- In office 1871–1872

Personal details
- Born: March 22, 1839 Lapeer County, Michigan, U.S.
- Died: July 28, 1896 (aged 57) Lapeer, Michigan, U.S.
- Party: Democratic

Military service
- Branch/service: Union Army
- Battles/wars: Civil War

Harrison H. Wheeler (March 22, 1839 – July 28, 1896) was a politician from the U.S. state of Michigan.

== Biography ==
Wheeler was born at Farmers Creek in Lapeer County, Michigan and attended the common schools. He taught school until 1861 and the outbreak of the Civil War. He enlisted in the Union Army, November 1, 1861, as a private in Company C, Tenth Regiment, Michigan Volunteer Infantry. He was promoted to second lieutenant in June 1862, then first lieutenant of Company E in the same regiment, in April 1863. He was captain of Company F in the same regiment in April 1865. At the close of the war, he settled in Bay City, Michigan.

Wheeler was elected clerk of Bay County in 1866. He studied law, was admitted to the bar in 1868, and commenced practice in Bay City. He was a member of the Michigan Senate (27th District) from 1871 to 1872. He moved to Ludington the following year and again served in the state Senate (24th District) from 1873 to 1874. He was appointed circuit judge in 1874 and later elected to the office only to resign in June 1878. He was appointed postmaster April 16, 1878, and served until his successor was appointed on April 26, 1882. He resumed the practice of law in Ludington.

In 1890, was elected as a Democrat from Michigan's 9th congressional district to the 52nd United States Congress, defeating incumbent Republican Byron M. Cutcheon. Wheeler served from March 4, 1891, to March 3, 1893. He was defeated in 1892 by Republican John W. Moon.

Harrison H. Wheeler was appointed United States pension agent at Detroit on February 8, 1894, and served until his death. He died at Farmers Creek, near Lapeer and is interred in Lakeview Cemetery of Ludington.

== See also ==
U.S. House of Representatives
Preceded by Byron M. Cutcheon	United States Representative for the 9th congressional district of Michigan; 1891 – 1893	Succeeded by John W. Moon
