= James Archbald =

American politician

James Archbald, 1793–1870

James Archbald (1793–1870) was a Scottish-American railroad executive and politician. After immigrating to the United States with his family in 1805, he later was elected as Pennsylvania state representative and as the first mayor of Carbondale, Pennsylvania.

== Early life and family ==
Archbald was born March 3, 1793, on Little Cumbrae island, off the Ayrshire coast of Scotland, to a family of shepherds. His family was one of many displaced by the Lowland Clearances; they emigrated to the United States when he was 14. They purchased a farm in the Mohawk Valley in New York.

In 1832 he married Sarah Augusta Frothingham (born 1805), the daughter of Major Thomas and Elizabeth Frost Frothingham of Sand Lake, New York. They had seven children: James, Mary, Augusta, Thomas, Robert, a son who died in infancy, and a daughter Elizabeth, who died at age 12.

== Railroad career ==
From his location in the Mohawk Valley, Archbald had become familiar with the Erie Canal, which was completed through the Mohawk Valley in 1824. He went into the canal and railroad industry, which was displacing canals as the transportation of choice. Succeeding John B. Jervis, Archbald served as the general superintendent of the Delaware and Hudson Canal Company (D&H) from 1829 to 1854. He helped plan the construction of the Pennsylvania Coal Company's railroad from Pittston to Hawley in 1847.

He left D&H to become the vice president of Michigan Southern and Northern Indiana Railroad in 1854. Two years later in 1856, he became the general manager and chief engineer of the Delaware, Lackawanna and Western Railroad and relocated to Scranton, where it had its headquarters. He lived there until his death in 1870.

== Political career ==
In 1851 Archbald was elected as the first mayor of Carbondale, Pennsylvania. He was reelected three times and served four terms. His last year of office was 1855. He was nominated at the Lackawanna County Convention held at Wilkes-Barre September 4, 1866, to represent the 133rd district in the Pennsylvania House of Representatives. He had no partisan affiliation.

== Legacy and honors ==
- Archbald borough is named in his honor.
