= Harry W. Musselwhite =

American politician

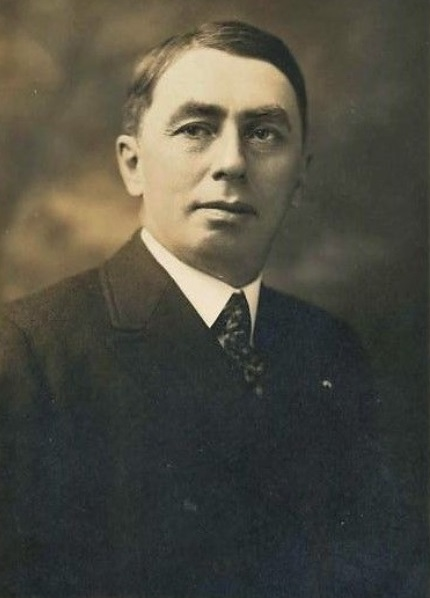
- Souvenir photo of Musselwhite as editor and publisher of the Manistee Daily News-Advocate, circa 1920

Member of the U.S. House of Representatives from Michigan's 9th district
- In office March 4, 1933 – January 3, 1935
- Preceded by: James C. McLaughlin
- Succeeded by: Albert J. Engel

Personal details
- Born: May 23, 1868 Coldwater, Michigan, U.S.
- Died: December 14, 1955 (aged 87) San Lorenzo, California, U.S.
- Party: Democratic

Harry Webster Musselwhite (May 23, 1868 – December 14, 1955) was a politician from the U.S. state of Michigan.

Musselwhite was born on a farm near Coldwater, Michigan and attended the district school and the high school there. He apprenticed, and was later employed, as a printer in Coldwater from 1886 to 1888. He then moved to Detroit and was employed as a newspaper reporter from 1888 to 1905. He then served as city editor and sports writer of the Grand Rapids Herald in Grand Rapids from 1905 to 1914,

Musselwhite moved to Manistee and became owner, editor, and publisher of the Manistee Daily News-Advocate from 1915 to 1928. He was supervisor of census for Michigan's 9th congressional district in 1920 and for the fourth district in 1930. He was also a member and vice chairman of the Michigan Hospital Commission from 1927 to 1932.

In 1932, running as a Democratic candidate, Musselwhite defeated incumbent Republican U.S. Representative James C. McLaughlin to be elected from Michigan's 9th congressional district to the 73rd Congress, serving from March 4, 1933 to January 3, 1935. He was an unsuccessful candidate for reelection in 1934 to the 74th Congress, losing to Republican Albert J. Engel.

After leaving Congress, Musselwhite engaged in the management of newspaper properties until his retirement. He was a Congregationalist and a member of Freemasons, Shriners, Eagles, and Elks. He died in San Lorenzo, California and is interred at Cypress Lawn Cemetery of Coloma.

U.S. House of Representatives
Preceded by James C. McLaughlin	United States Representative for the 9th congressional district of Michigan; 1933 – 1935	Succeeded by Albert J. Engel
