= Byron M. Cutcheon =

Union Army officer and politician

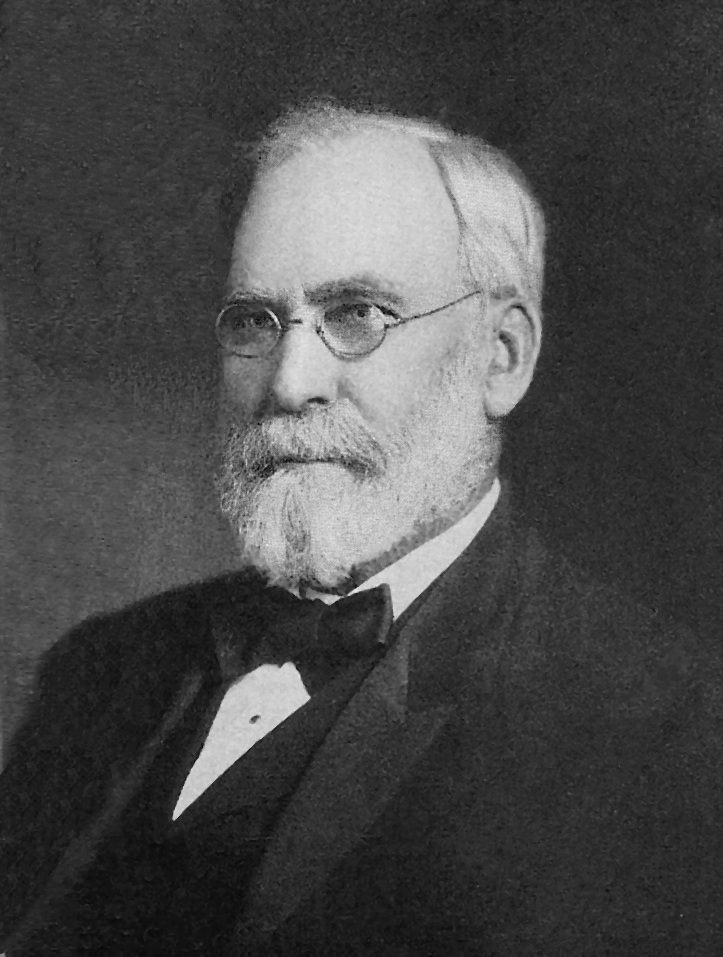

Member of the U.S. House of Representatives from Michigan's 9th district
- In office March 4, 1883 – March 3, 1891
- Preceded by: Jay A. Hubbell
- Succeeded by: Harrison H. Wheeler

Personal details
- Born: May 11, 1836 Pembroke, New Hampshire, US
- Died: April 12, 1908 (aged 71) Ypsilanti, Michigan, US
- Party: Republican
- Spouse: Marie Amnie Warner
- Education: University of Michigan
- Awards: Medal of Honor

Military service
- Allegiance: United States
- Years of service: 1862–1865
- Rank: Brevet Brigadier General
- Commands: 27th Michigan Volunteer Infantry Regiment
- Battles/wars: American Civil War

Byron Mac Cutcheon (May 11, 1836 – April 12, 1908) was an American Civil War officer, Medal of Honor recipient and politician from the U.S. state of Michigan.

== Early life ==
Cutcheon was born in Pembroke, New Hampshire May 11, 1836 but his parents died and he became an orphan at a young age. He worked in a cotton mill in Pembroke to earn money so he could attend school and at the age of 13, he began attending Pembroke Academy. At the age of 17, he was a teacher in the same school but in 1855, he moved to Ypsilanti, Michigan, continuing to study and teach. In 1857, he was invited to take charge of Birmingham Academy in Oakland County as principal, though he intended only to remain long enough to secure means to further progress in his own education. The following spring, he entered the University of Michigan and in the fall of 1859, he worked as principal of the Oak Grove Academy, in Lenawee County in order to support himself. As soon as he had acquired sufficient means, he again entered the university, and graduated in 1861. Before graduating he had become the principal and was a professor of ancient languages, higher mathematics and mental and moral philosophy in the Ypsilanti High School, 1861 and 1862.

== Civil War positions ==
He resigned his school post to enlist in the Union Army following the outbreak of the American Civil War and raised a company for the Twentieth Regiment, Michigan Infantry who mustered him into service as a Second Lieutenant. On July 29, 1862, he was made captain of his company and on October 14, 1862, he was made major of the Twentieth Regiment. On November 16, 1863, he was promoted to lieutenant colonel, and by order of the U.S. War Department, he was made colonel on November 21, 1863.

He was transferred and made Colonel of the Twenty-seventh Michigan Infantry, November 12, 1864. He was mustered into the United States service as colonel, December 19, 1864, and was brevetted colonel of U. S. Volunteers, August 18, 1864, for gallant services at the battles of the Wilderness and Spottsylvania Court House.

During his service in the American Civil War he was in the battles of Fredericksburg, Virginia; Horseshoe Bend, Kentucky; the siege of Vicksburg, Mississippi; the Assault on Jackson, Mississippi; the battles of Blue Springs, Tennessee; London, Tennessee; Campbell's Station, Tennessee; the siege of Knoxville, Tennessee; the Assault on Fort Saunders, at Knoxville; Thurley's Ford, Tennessee; Strawberry Plains, Tennessee; Chuckey Bend; Wilderness (for actions during which he would later be awarded the Medal of Honor); Ny River; Spottsylvania Court House (in which he was wounded, while leading a charge of the Twentieth Michigan and Fifty-first Pennsylvania). He remained at the hospital about two months. For gallant conduct on this occasion he received a commission as brevet colonel. He was next in the siege of Petersburg, July, 1864, the Weldon Railroad, Reams Station, Virginia; Poplar Spring Church, Virginia; Boydton Plank Road, Hatcher's Run, and the siege of Petersburg, from November 1864, to March 1865.

On October 16, 1864, he was assigned the command of the Second Brigade, Fifteenth Division Ninth Army Corps, and remained in command of that brigade until March 6, 1865, when he resigned on account of sickness in his family. He was brevetted brigadier general of U.S. Volunteers, March 13, 1865, for conspicuous gallantry on the field of battle.

== After the war ==
After the war he returned home and entered into the law office of his brother, Sullivan M. Cutcheon, in Ypsilanti. At the time, Sullivan was Speaker of the Michigan House of Representatives and later became U.S. Attorney for the Eastern District of Michigan. He entered the University of Michigan Law School in 1865 and graduated in March 1866. He was admitted to practice in Washtenaw County in January 1866. In the Spring of 1866 he was appointed the state agent of the Michigan Soldiers' Monumental Association. When the association was inaugurated, in 1865, addresses were made on that occasion by Gen. Cutcheon, Hon. Austin Blair, (Michigan's war governor), Hon. Jacob M. Howard and Gen. Orlando B. Wilcox. In this work he traveled all over the state, making appeals to the people and securing their aid in this grand undertaking. In fall 1866, he moved to Ionia to resume the practice of law. In July 1867, he moved to Manistee. He was appointed a member of the State Board of Railroad Commissioners, 1867–1883. In 1866 he was also appointed president of the Michigan Soldiers' Home Commission, Governor Henry H. Crapo. He served as a Presidential elector from Michigan in 1868, casting votes for the ticket of Ulysses S. Grant and Schuyler Colfax.

He was elected to the Board of Regents of the University of Michigan in 1875 and served until 1883. He was the city attorney of Manistee, 1870–1873; prosecuting attorney of Manistee County in 1873 and 1874; and postmaster of Manistee, 1877–1883.

In 1882, Cutcheon was elected as a Republican from Michigan's 9th congressional district to the 49th Congress. He was re-elected to the three succeeding Congresses, serving from March 4, 1883, to March 3, 1891. He served as chairman, Committee on Military Affairs in the 51st Congress. In 1890, Cutcheon lost to Democrat Harrison H. Wheeler in the general election.

In 1887, he was the Moderator of the Congregationalists' "General Association of Michigan" annual meeting held in Lansing He was also a companion of the District of Columbia Commandery of the Military Order of the Loyal Legion of the United States and a compatriot of the Sons of the American Revolution.

== Family and later life ==
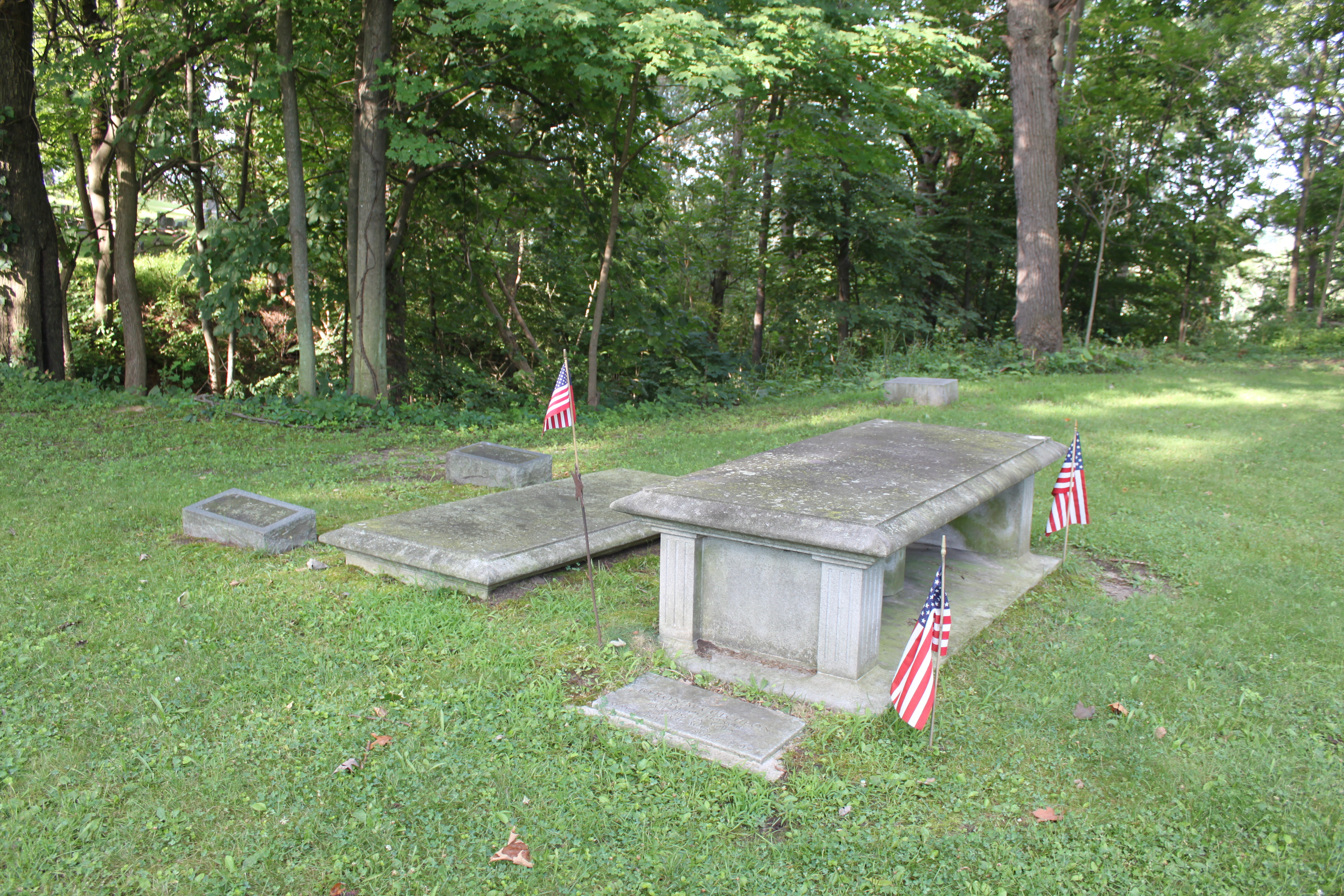
Cutcheon family gravesite, Highland Cemetery

Cutcheon was married at Dexter, June 22, 1863, to Miss Marie A. Warner, of Ann Arbor. They raised five children, four sons and one daughter, named, respectively, Frank Warner, Charles Tripp, Max Hart, Frederick Richard, and Marie Louise.

Cutcheon was awarded a Medal of Honor on June 29, 1891, "for distinguished gallantry at the Battle of the Wilderness", Virginia on May 7, 1864. He was appointed civilian member of the Board of Ordnance and Fortifications by U.S. President Benjamin Harrison in July 1891 and served until March 25, 1895. He was editorial writer for the Detroit Daily Tribune and the Detroit Journal, 1895–1897. He resumed the practice of law in Grand Rapids and died in Ypsilanti, where he is interred in Highland Cemetery.

== Works ==
- Utley, Henry M.; Cutcheon, Byron M. (1906). "Michigan as a Province, Territory and State: The Twenty-sixth Member of the Federal Union". Publishing Society of Michigan.

== See also ==
- List of American Civil War Medal of Honor recipients: A–F

== Notes ==
U.S. House of Representatives
Preceded by Jay A. Hubbell	United States Representative for the 9th Congressional District of Michigan; 1883 – 1891	Succeeded by Harrison H. Wheeler
