= Spanish Treaty Claims Commission =

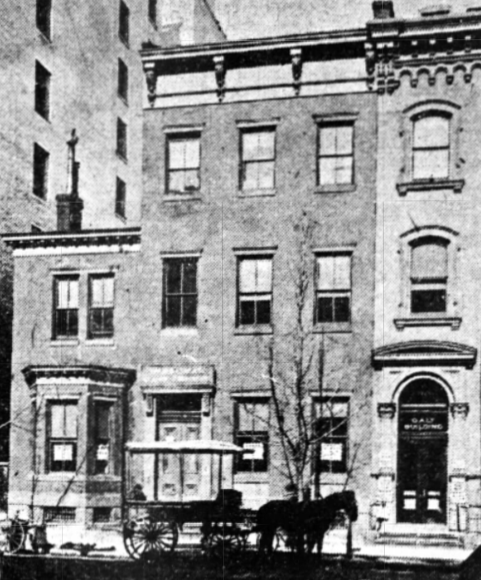
Spanish Treaty Claims Commission Building in Washington, D.C. (1911)

The Spanish Treaty Claims Commission was established by the United States at the conclusion of the Spanish–American War for the purpose of carrying out one of the terms of the treaty ending the war. The Commission was created by an Act of Congress approved March 2, 1901. Working from 1901 to 1910, the Commission resolved nearly $65 million in claims, and awarded less than $1.5 million.

== The United States' indemnification of Spain ==
Under Article VII of the 1898 Treaty of Paris, the United States assumed responsibility for the payment of all claims of her own citizens for which Spain would have been liable under principles of international law. Thus, in proceedings before the Commission, the United States government was effectively required to stand in the shoes of its defeated adversary, Spain, and to defend against the claims of its own citizens by defending the actions or omissions of Spain.

== Commissioners ==
President William McKinley appointed the original members of the Commission in 1901. The original Commissioners were recently defeated U.S. Senator William E. Chandler of New Hampshire (who was chosen as president), Gerrit J. Diekema of Michigan, James P. Wood of Ohio, William Arden Maury of the District of Columbia, and William L. Chambers of Alabama. Diekema resigned in 1907 upon his election to Congress, and was replaced by Harry K. Daugherty of Pennsylvania. When Chandler resigned in 1907, Wood took his place as chairman while former Congressman Roswell P. Bishop was added to the Commission.

McKinley also named former Congressman William E. Fuller of Iowa as Assistant Attorney General to defend against the claims. Fuller served from 1901 until 1907, when he resigned and was succeeded by former auditor and Congressman William Wallace Brown of Pennsylvania. From 1902 to 1904, Fuller was assisted by future federal judge Charles B. Witmer.

== Claims and payments ==
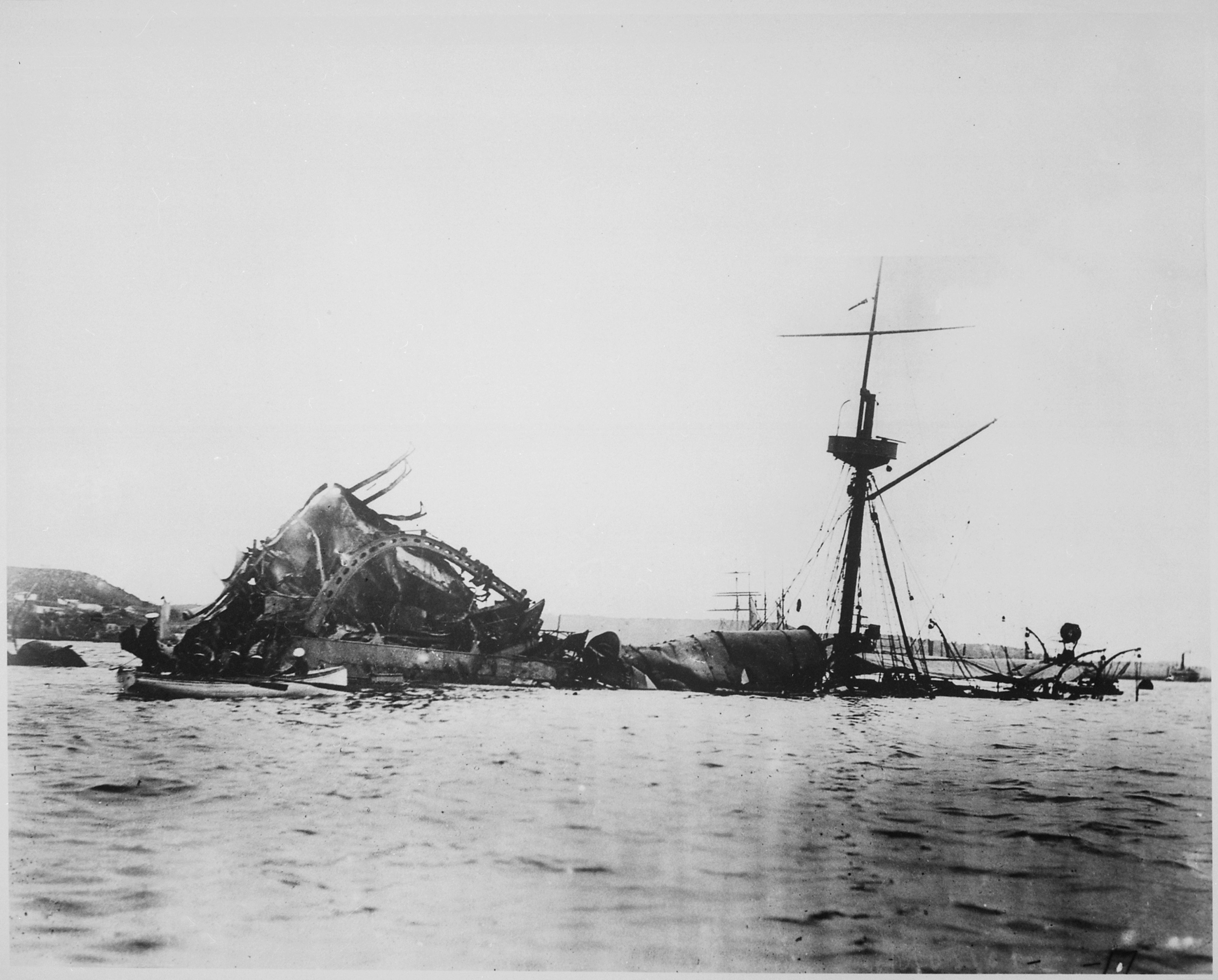
Wreckage of the USS Maine, 1898

U.S. citizens were given six months to submit their claims to the Commission, although timely claims were sometimes amended after that deadline. Adjudicating the claims was often difficult because of logistical challenges. In the main, the witnesses were not in the United States where the Commission worked, but were in Cuba or Spain. Officials in Spain were initially noncooperative. For some claims, the need for claimants to hold U.S. citizenship gave rise to disputes regarding their nationality. The Commission also faced important legal questions, including the validity of claims arising from damages incurred during battles between Cuban insurgents and Spanish forces.

Twenty-one claims, totalling $279,750, were paid for personal injuries suffered by U.S. citizens at the hands of Spanish military authorities, usually when detained on suspicion of aiding the insurrection and in violation of the 1795 Pinckney's Treaty between the two nations.

The majority of the claims paid by the Commission arose out of appropriations of land, livestock and other property by Spain. Where the Commission concluded that damages were the result of destruction that was justifiable under the rules and usages of war, the claims were denied.

The largest specific item of destruction for which claims were filed was the loss of sugar cane fields burned by insurgents or Spanish forces. All but one such claim was denied.

Over 150 claims, totalling $2,825,200, arose from the destruction of the USS Maine in the harbor of Havana, Cuba on February 15, 1898. Those claims, made by naval officers, seamen or their survivors, were all dismissed. The Commission reasoned that international law would not hold another country liable to American military officers, because such claims are national rather than personal, to be pursued only on behalf of the United States.

The Commission's awards totalled $1,387,845.74.
