= Robert W. Archbald =

American judge (1848–1926)

Robert Archbald
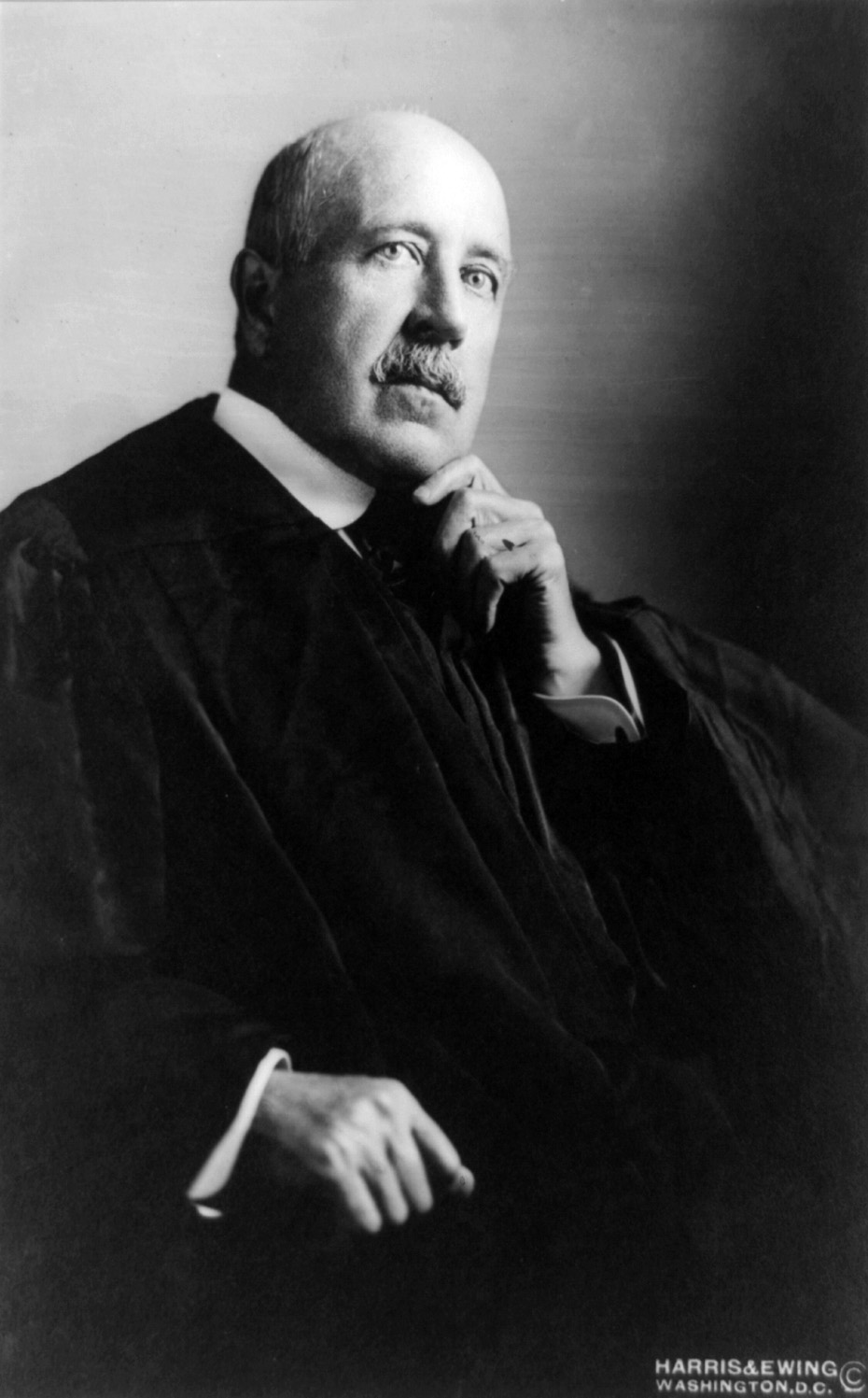

Judge of the United States Court of Appeals for the Third Circuit
- In office January 31, 1911 – January 13, 1913
- Appointed by: William Howard Taft
- Preceded by: Seat established
- Succeeded by: Seat abolished

Judge of the United States Circuit Courts for the Third Circuit
- In office January 31, 1911 – December 31, 1911
- Appointed by: William Howard Taft
- Preceded by: Seat established
- Succeeded by: Seat abolished

Judge of the United States Commerce Court
- In office January 31, 1911 – January 13, 1913
- Appointed by: William Howard Taft
- Preceded by: Seat established
- Succeeded by: Seat abolished

Judge of the United States District Court for the Middle District of Pennsylvania
- In office March 29, 1901 – February 1, 1911
- Appointed by: William McKinley (recess); Theodore Roosevelt (commission)
- Preceded by: Seat established
- Succeeded by: Charles B. Witmer

Personal details
- Born: Robert Wodrow Archbald; September 10, 1848 Carbondale, Pennsylvania, U.S.
- Died: August 19, 1926 (aged 77) Martha's Vineyard, Massachusetts, U.S.
- Education: Yale College (AB)

Robert Wodrow Archbald (September 10, 1848 – August 19, 1926), known as R. W. Archbald, was a United States circuit judge of the United States Commerce Court, the United States Court of Appeals for the Third Circuit and the United States Circuit Courts for the Third Circuit and previously was a United States district judge of the United States District Court for the Middle District of Pennsylvania. He was the ninth federal official on whom articles of impeachment were served, and only the third to be convicted and removed from office.

== Education and career ==
Born in Carbondale, Pennsylvania, of James Archbald and Sarah Augusta Frothingham Archbald (born 1805), Archbald attended Yale College, graduating with an Artium Baccalaureus degree in 1871. He read law in 1873, and was admitted to the bar, entering private practice until 1884. That year, Archbald was appointed as a Judge of the Lackawanna County (45th Judicial District) Court of Common Pleas. In 1888, Archbald became President Judge of the Court of Common Pleas for Lackawanna County in 1888.

== Federal judge ==
Archbald received a recess appointment from President William McKinley on March 29, 1901, to the United States District Court for the Middle District of Pennsylvania, to a new seat authorized by 31 Stat. 880. He was nominated to the same position by President Theodore Roosevelt on December 5, 1901. He was confirmed by the United States Senate on December 17, 1901, and received his commission the same day. His service terminated on February 1, 1911, due to his elevation to the Commerce Court and Third Circuit.

Archbald was nominated by President William Howard Taft on December 12, 1910, to the United States Commerce Court, the United States Court of Appeals for the Third Circuit and the United States Circuit Courts for the Third Circuit, to a new joint seat authorized by 36 Stat. 539. He was confirmed by the United States Senate on January 31, 1911, and received his commission the same day. On December 31, 1911, the Circuit Courts were abolished and he thereafter served on the Commerce Court and Court of Appeals. His service terminated on January 13, 1913, due to his impeachment, conviction and removal from office.

=== Impeachment ===
After Wrisley Brown investigated charges that Judge Archbald bought coal lands at cheap prices for his personal benefit from railroads and real estate interests involved in litigation before his federal court, and also took a European trip in 1910 paid for by those frequent litigants, the House Judiciary Committee recommended to the United States House of Representatives that he be impeached. The railroads alleged to be shaken down included the Erie Railroad, Lehigh Valley Railroad and the Reading Railroad.

The United States House of Representatives voted to send 13 articles of impeachment against Archbald to the U.S. Senate, by a vote of 223 to 1 on July 13, 1912; only Scranton's U.S. Congressman, John R. Farr, who sat on the Committee, voted in Archbald's favor. Articles I, II, III and VI alleged that Archbald had entered into agreements with litigants at a substantial benefit to himself, Article IV alleged a wrongful communication with litigants, Articles V, VII, VIII, IX and X alleged that he had improperly solicited and accepted gifts from litigants, Article XI alleged he had improperly solicited and accepted gifts from attorneys, Article XII alleged he allowed corrupt practices during jury selection and Article XIII alleged a general charge of bringing the judiciary into disrepute.

On July 16, 1912, the Senate began Archbald's trial. Judge Archbald took the witness stand in his own defense on January 6, 1913, claiming that the gifts and favorable deals were the result of longstanding friendships, and his wife also testified for the defense. The Senate convicted him of five of the 13 articles on January 13, 1913.

The exact voting division on each article is as follows:

Article	Guilty	Not guilty	Result
Article I	68	5	Convicted
Article II	46	25	Acquitted
Article III	60	11	Convicted
Article IV	52	20	Convicted
Article V	66	6	Convicted
Article VI	24	45	Acquitted
Article VII	29	36	Acquitted
Article VIII	22	42	Acquitted
Article IX	23	39	Acquitted
Article X	1	65	Acquitted
Article XI	11	51	Acquitted
Article XII	19	46	Acquitted
Article XIII	42	20	Convicted

Archbald was convicted on Articles I, III, IV, V and XIII and was accordingly removed from office (Article II gained a majority of votes, but not the two-thirds necessary under the U.S. Constitution to convict), and the Senate subsequently voted, by 39 to 35, to order that Archbald be forever disqualified from holding any office under the United States. Pennsylvania's two Republican Senators, Boies Penrose of Philadelphia, and George T. Oliver of Pittsburgh, had voted against impeachment and lifetime disqualification.

Despite the outcome, Archbald continued to declare his innocence. "I have always known that I have done no wrong and the vote of no one makes it otherwise," he said before leaving for Scranton with his family. "Judge Archbald came as near being an ideal common pleas judge as one can hope to find," one judicial colleague said upon his death. Lawyers eulogized him as a "discriminating practitioner" whose influence "made a deeper impression than any other judge in the history" of Lackawanna County.

== Death ==
Archbald died on August 19, 1926, in Martha's Vineyard, Massachusetts.

== Sources ==
- "GPO History of Impeachment". frwebgate.access.gpo.gov. Archived from the original on November 12, 2008.

Legal offices
New seat	Judge of the United States District Court for the Middle District of Pennsylvania; 1901–1911	Succeeded by Charles B. Witmer
New seat	Judge of the United States Commerce Court; 1911–1913	Seat abolished
New seat	Judge of the United States Circuit Courts for the Third Circuit; 1911	Seat abolished
New seat	Judge of the United States Court of Appeals for the Third Circuit; 1911–1913	Seat abolished
