= Roswell P. Bishop =

American soldier, politician (1843–1920)

Roswell Bishop
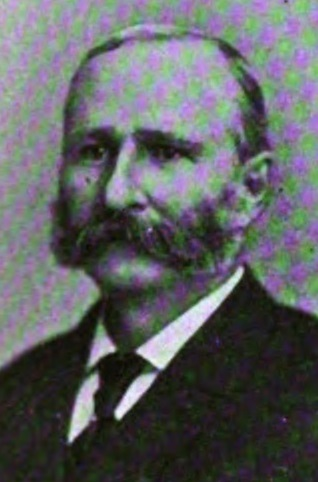

Member of the U.S. House of Representatives from Michigan's 9th district
- In office March 4, 1895 – March 3, 1907
- Preceded by: John W. Moon
- Succeeded by: James C. McLaughlin

Personal details
- Born: January 6, 1843 Sidney, New York, U.S.
- Died: March 4, 1920 (aged 77) Pacific Grove, California, U.S.
- Resting place: El Carmelo Cemetery, California
- Party: Republican
- Education: University of Michigan
- Occupation: Lawyer

Roswell Peter Bishop (January 6, 1843 – March 4, 1920) was an American Civil War veteran, lawyer, and a politician from the U.S. state of Michigan. He served six terms in the United States House of Representatives from 1895 to 1907.

== Early life, Civil War service and education ==
Bishop was born in Sidney, New York, and attended Unadilla Academy, Cooperstown Seminary and Walton Academy, all in Upstate New York, after which he taught school for several years.

During the American Civil War, he enlisted as a private in Company C, Forty-third Regiment, New York Volunteer Infantry, in 1861, and was discharged in December 1862 because of a wound which necessitated the amputation of his right arm.

He entered the University of Michigan in September 1868 where he remained until December 1872. He studied law, was admitted to the bar in Ann Arbor in May 1875, and commenced practice in Ludington, Michigan.

== Political career ==
He was elected prosecuting attorney of Mason County in 1876, 1878, and 1884. He was a member of the Michigan State House of Representatives in 1882 and 1892.

Bishop was elected as a Republican from Michigan's 9th congressional district to the United States House of Representatives for the 54th Congress and to the five succeeding Congresses, serving from March 4, 1895, until March 3, 1907. He was chairman of the House Committee on Ventilation and Acoustics in the 57th through 59th Congresses.

He was an unsuccessful candidate for re-nomination in 1906 and resumed the practice of law in Ludington. He served as a member of the Michigan constitutional convention in 1907 and was appointed a member of the Spanish Treaty Claims Commission in December 1907 and served until the work of the commission was completed.

== After Congress ==
He moved to Hollister, California, in 1910 and engaged in fruit growing. He died at Pacific Grove, California, aged 77, and is interred in the El Carmelo Cemetery there.

His former home 302 N. Harrison Street in Ludington, erected in 1892, has been the rectory of Grace Episcopal Church since 1945.

U.S. House of Representatives
Preceded by John W. Moon	United States Representative for the 9th congressional district of Michigan; 1895 – 1907	Succeeded by James C. McLaughlin
