= United States Commerce Court =

Specialized US federal court (1910–1913)

The Commerce Court of the United States was a short-lived federal trial court. It was created by the Mann-Elkins Act in 1910 and abolished three years later. The Commerce Court was a specialized court, given jurisdiction over cases arising from orders of the Interstate Commerce Commission and empowered with judicial review of those orders. The United States Supreme Court was given appellate jurisdiction over the Commerce Court.

The modern United States Court of Appeals for the Federal Circuit, created in 1982, has a purpose similar to the Commerce Court, although the Federal Circuit has broader jurisdiction.

== Organization ==
The Commerce Court also had one of the more unusual structures in United States judicial history. There were five judges serving staggered five-year terms on the Commerce Court. These judges were, nonetheless, Article III judges, and were to be reassigned to an appellate court when their term on the Commerce Court expired. Moreover, even while they served on the Commerce Court, they also served as an at-large appellate judge and could be assigned by the Chief Justice of the United States to any appellate court to help relieve the workload.

Once the court was abolished, the four remaining judges of the court served out their lifetime appointment as at-large appellate judges. (The fifth judge of the court, Robert W. Archbald, had been impeached and removed from office.)

== Judges ==
All of the judges who served on the Commerce Court were appointed by President William Howard Taft. The court had no chief judge, and no judge on the court achieved senior status. All of the judges ended their service with the court upon its abolition, except for Robert W. Archbald, who was impeached and convicted for corrupt practices, specifically soliciting and receiving gifts from persons doing business before the court.

Judge	State	Born/Died	Began active service*	Ended active service
Martin Augustine Knapp	NY	1843–1923	1910	1913
Robert W. Archbald	PA	1848–1926	1911	1913
John Emmett Carland	SD	1853–1922	1911	1913
William Henry Hunt	MT	1857–1949	1911	1913
Julian William Mack	IL	1866–1943	1911	1913

* This column refers only to the judges' terms in the Commerce Court.

== Cases ==
- The Intermountain Rate Case, 191 Fed 856 (1911)
- The Pipe Line Cases', 204 Fed 798 (1913)
- Shreveport Case, 205 Fed. 380 (1913)
- Tap Line Cases, 209 Fed. 244 (1913)
- Louisville & Nashville R. R. Co. v Interstate Commerce Commission, 195 Fed. 541 (1912)*
- Procter & Gamble Co. v. United States, 188 Fed. 221 (1911)
- Goodrich Transit Co. v Interstate Commerce Commission, 190 Fed. 943 (1911)
- Los Angeles Switching Cases, 188 Fed. 229 (1911)

94 cases were docketed in the Commerce Court. 43 decisions were delivered, 22 appeals.
