= Weikert, Pennsylvania =

Unincorporated community in Pennsylvania, US

- Unincorporated community
- Location within Pennsylvania
- Coordinates: 40°51′30″N 77°17′43″W
- Country: United States
- State: Pennsylvania
- County: Union
- Elevation: 732 ft (223 m)
- Time zone: UTC-5 (Eastern (EST))
  - Summer (DST): UTC-4 (EDT)
- ZIP code: 17885
- Area codes: 272 & 570
- GNIS feature ID: 1190777

Weikert is an unincorporated community in Union County, Pennsylvania, United States. The community is 7.8 miles (12.6 km) west-southwest of Hartleton. Weikert has a post office with ZIP code 17885.
