= High Commissioner to the Philippines =

US President's representative, 1935–1946

High Commissioner of the Philippines
- Alto Comisionado de Filipinas; Kataas-taasang Komisyonado sa Pilipinas
- Residence: High Commissioner's Residence
- Appointer: President of the United States between 1935 and 1946
- Precursor: Governor-General of the Philippines
- Formation: November 15, 1935
- First holder: Frank Murphy
- Final holder: Paul V. McNutt
- Abolished: July 4, 1946
- Succession: U.S Ambassador to the Philippines

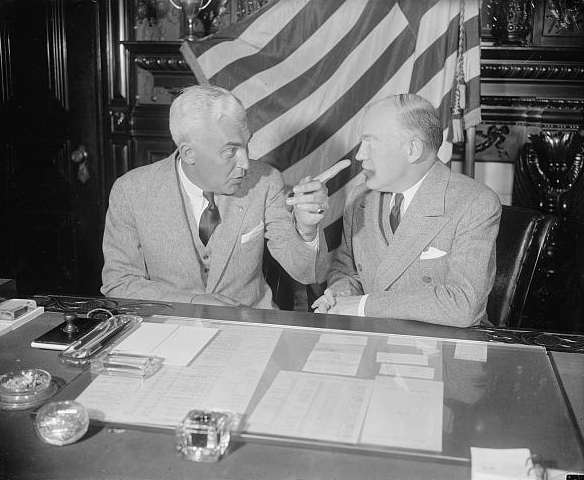
High Commissioner to the Philippines Paul V. McNutt (left) makes a point to Secretary of War Harry H. Woodring during an official visit to Washington in 1938.

The high commissioner to the Philippines was the personal representative of the president of the United States to the Commonwealth of the Philippines during the period 1935–1946. The office was created by the Tydings–McDuffie Act of 1934, which provided for a period of transition from direct American rule to the complete independence of the islands on July 4, 1946. It replaced the office of governor-general of the Philippines, who had direct executive authority. Under the commonwealth, executive power was held by an elected Filipino president. The executive power of the high commissioner was largely ceremonial, and its office is similar to that of an ambassador.

The office of high commissioner was held by:

- Frank Murphy, November 15, 1935 – December 31, 1936
- Weldon Jones, December 31, 1936 – April 26, 1937 (Acting)
- Paul V. McNutt, April 26, 1937 – July 12, 1939
- Weldon Jones, July 12, 1939 – October 28, 1939 (Acting)
- Francis Bowes Sayre Sr., October 28, 1939 – October 12, 1942
- Harold L. Ickes, October 12, 1942 – September 14, 1945 (Secretary of the Interior, assuming functions during Japanese occupation)
- Paul V. McNutt, September 14, 1945 – July 4, 1946

Murphy had previously served as governor-general. Sayre's tenure was interrupted by the Japanese occupation of the Philippines during World War II. McNutt became the first United States ambassador to the Philippines after Philippine independence in 1946.

== High Commissioner's Residence ==
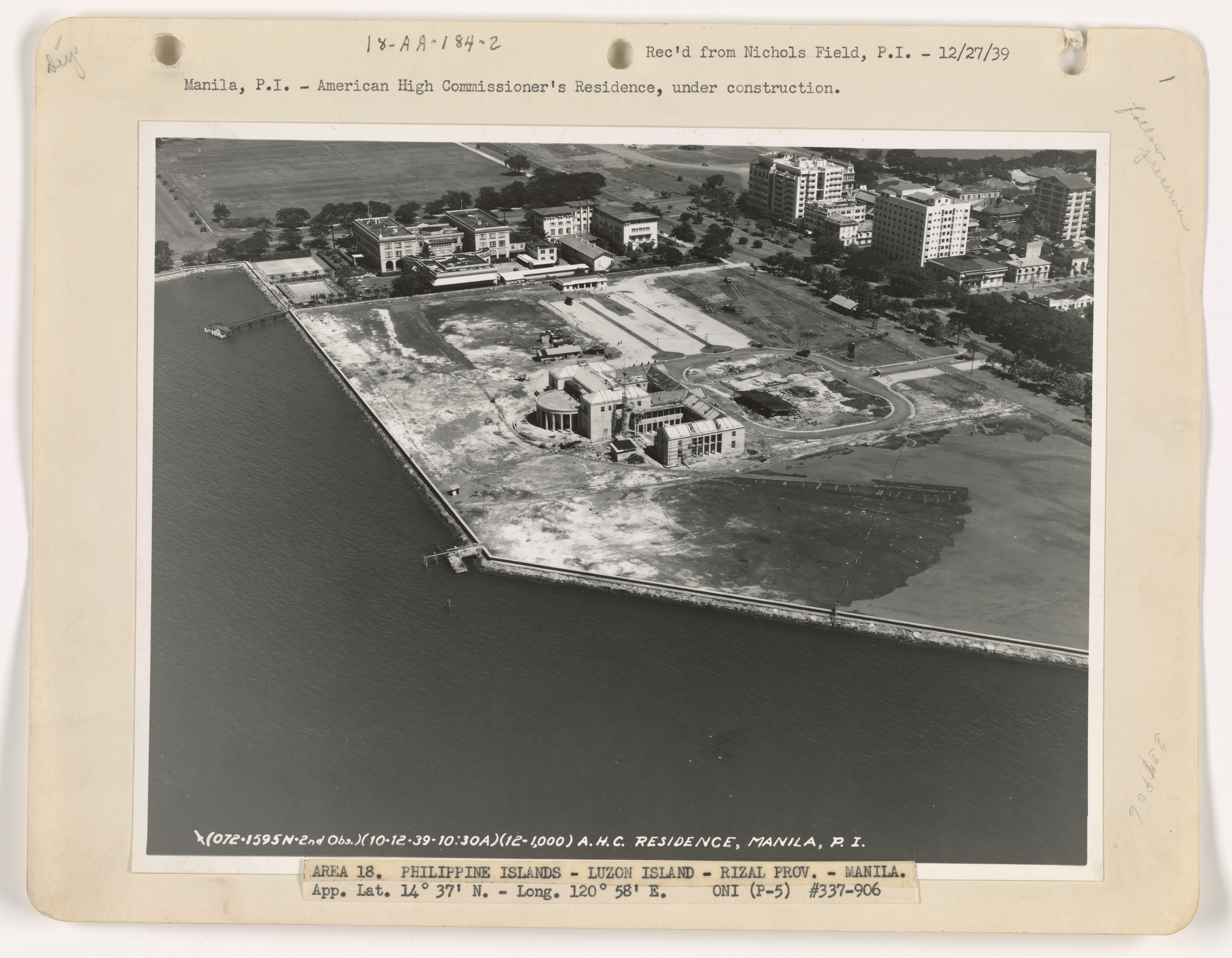
Aerial view of the American High Commissioner's Residence, under construction, 1939

With the inauguration of the Philippine Commonwealth, Malacañang Palace was turned over to the president of the Philippines, necessitating a new home for the highest American government official in the Philippines. A new location was found along now-Roxas Boulevard and a High Commissioner's Residence was built. According to the book titled Manila Americans by Lewis Gleeck. "On April 1, 1937, McNutt arrived (in Manila) with Mrs. McNutt and a sixteen-year-old daughter. Since the relinquishment of Malacañang, there had been no official residence for the High Commissioner, so (Paul) McNutt moved into El Nido, the sumptuous Dewey Boulevard residence of Attorney E.A. Perkins...".

On January 2, 1942, as Japanese forces entered the city of Manila, four members of the high commissioner's staff, Elise Flahaven, George Gray, Virginia Hewlett and Margaret Pierce, lowered the American flag that flew at the high commissioner's headquarters, burned it and buried its ashes to prevent its capture by the Japanese. On February 22, 1945, General Douglas MacArthur, supreme commander of the Allied Forces in the Southwest Pacific Area, again raised the flag at the high commissioner's headquarters after recapturing Manila.

The high commissioner's headquarters today houses the American embassy in the Philippines.

== The American Residence ==
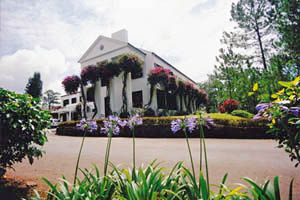
The American Residence in Baguio

The American Residence in Baguio was built to be the summer home of the high commissioner, to replace The Mansion that was the governor-general's summer residence and that had been turned over to the president of the Philippines upon the inauguration of the commonwealth.

== See also ==
- Governor-General of the Philippines
