= List of University of Pennsylvania academics =

Penn alumni are the founders of a number of colleges, as well as eight medical schools, including New York University Medical School and Vanderbilt University School of Medicine; and current or past presidents of over one hundred universities and colleges, including Harvard University, University of Pennsylvania, Princeton University, Cornell University, University of California system, University of Texas system, Carnegie Mellon University, Northwestern University, Bowdoin College and Williams College.

== Academic administration ==
- Cyrus Adler: chancellor, Jewish Theological Seminary; president, Dropsie College
- Reuven Amitai: dean of the faculty of humanities at the Hebrew University of Jerusalem (2012– )
- John Andrews, D.D.: clergyman; 4th provost of University of Pennsylvania (1810–1813); founder of York College of Pennsylvania
- Tamar Ariav: Israeli president of Beit Berl College
- Katrina Armstrong: Dean of the Faculties of Health Sciences at Columbia University and interim president of Columbia University (2024-2025)
- Robert L. Barchi: 20th president of Rutgers University; past president of Thomas Jefferson University
- John Milton Bernhisel: original trustee of the University of Utah
- William Bingham: banker and politician who was highly influential in the founding of Dickinson College; "Bingham's Porch" was long a rallying cry at Dickinson
- James Lloyd Breck (Class of 1838): founder of the Seabury Divinity School, now part of the Seabury-Western Theological Seminary, a prominent Episcopal seminary; namesake of the Breck School in Minneapolis
- Mark Burstein: president of Lawrence University (2013– )
- Alison Byerly: 12th president of Carleton College (2021– ); first female president of Lafayette College (2013–21)
- Gaylen Byker: president of Calvin College (1995–2012)
- Charles Caldwell (Penn Med Class of 1796): with Penn alumni John Esteen Cooke and Charles Wilkins Short (Penn Med Class of 1815), organized the Louisville (Kentucky) Medical Institute (now the University of Louisville School of Medicine); Caldwell served as first dean (1837–1838)
- William P. Carey: namesake and benefactor of the Carey Business School at Johns Hopkins University, the W. P. Carey School of Business at Arizona State University, and the University of Maryland Francis King Carey School of Law
- Kimberly Wright Cassidy: 9th president of Bryn Mawr College
- Jared Cohon: president of Carnegie Mellon University (1997–2013)
- Al-Hassan Conteh: president of the University of Liberia
- Lee Copeland: former dean of the University of Washington College of Architecture and Urban Planning and the University of Pennsylvania School of Design
- Robert A. Corrigan: president of San Francisco State University (1988– ); past chair of the Board of Directors of the Association of American Colleges and Universities
- Mary Cullinan: president, Eastern Washington University; past president of Southern Oregon University (2006–14)
- Edward Cutbush: founder of Geneva Medical College (now State University of New York Upstate Medical University), and first dean (1834–1839)
- Robert Davidson (Class of 1771): president of Dickinson College (1804–09)
- Samuel Henry Dickson: with alumnus John Edwards Holbrook, co-founded the Medical College of South Carolina (now the Medical University of South Carolina)
- Paul A. Dodd: president of San Francisco State University (1962–66); dean of the UCLA College of Letters and Science (1946–61); namesake of Dodd Hall on UCLA's campus
- Harold Dodds: fifteenth president of Princeton University (1933–1957)
- Daniel Drake: organized the Medical College of Ohio and Cincinnati College; both later became the University of Cincinnati
- John W. Draper: founder and president of New York University Medical School (1850–73), and founding president of the American Chemical Society
- Thomas Messinger Drown: 4th president of Lehigh University (namesake of Drown Hall on Lehigh's campus)
- Arnold Eisen: chancellor, Jewish Theological Seminary
- Patrick Ellis: president, The Catholic University of America (1992–98); president, La Salle University (1977–92)
- Joseph Esherick: co-founder of the UC Berkeley College of Environmental Design
- Drew Gilpin Faust: president, Harvard University (2007–2018) (first non-Harvard alum in over 300 years)
- Happy Fernandez: past president of the Moore College of Art and Design in Philadelphia
- Michael Fitts: legal scholar, former dean of the University of Pennsylvania Law School for 14 years, current president of Tulane University; Judge Rene H. Himel Professor of Law at the Tulane School of Law
- Richard M. Freeland: president of Northeastern University (1996–2006)
- Vernon F. Gallagher: 8th president of Duquesne University (1950–59)
- Thomas Sovereign Gates: president of the University of Pennsylvania (1930–44)
- Francis J. Gavin: director of the Henry A. Kissinger Center for Global Affairs at Johns Hopkins University School of Advanced International Studies in Washington, D.C.
- Henry D. Gilpin: president, Pennsylvania Academy of Fine Arts (1853–58)
- Michael Glick: dean of the State University of New York at Buffalo School of Dental Medicine
- Israel Goldstein: co-founder and first chairman of the Board of Trustees of Brandeis University
- Neil R. Grabois: president, Colgate University
- Frank Hastings Hamilton: a founder of Buffalo Medical College (now the State University of New York at Buffalo)
- Patrick T. Harker: president, University of Delaware
- Earl G. Harrison: dean of the University of Pennsylvania Law School; commissioner of the United States Immigration and Naturalization Service, 1942–44
- Chester David Hartranft: president, Hartford Theological Seminary (1888–1903)
- Peyton R. Helm: president of Muhlenberg College (2003–15)
- Joel Henry Hildebrand (Class of 1903): past dean of the college of chemistry at the University of California, Berkeley; namesake of Hildebrand Hall on Berkeley's campus; namesake of the Joel Henry Hildebrand Award sponsored by the American Chemical Society
- John Henry Hobart: founder, Geneva College (now Hobart and William Smith Colleges)
- Elizabeth Hoffman: provost and executive vice president, Iowa State University; president, University of Colorado System (2000–2005)
- Jerome H. Holland: president of Delaware State College (1953–59)
- Robert C. Holub: chancellor of the University of Massachusetts Amherst (2008– ); past undergraduate dean, College of Letters and Science at the University of California, Berkeley
- Joseph Hopkinson: president, Pennsylvania Academy of Fine Arts; served as successful counsel for Supreme Court Justice Samuel Chase in his impeachment trial before the United States Senate in 1804 and 1805
- Jon Huntsman Sr.: namesake and benefactor of the Jon M. Huntsman School of Business at Utah State University
- Ralph Cooper Hutchinson: 7th president of Washington & Jefferson College; 12th president of Lafayette College
- Sir Paul Judge: namesake and benefactor of the Judge Business School at the University of Cambridge
- Naamah Kelman: rabbi, dean of the Hebrew Union College-Jewish Institute of Religion campus in Jerusalem
- Raynard S. Kington: president of Grinnell College (2010– )
- Jared Potter Kirtland: studied at Penn and ultimately received his degree from Yale University; co-founder of the Case Western Reserve University School of Medicine and the Cleveland Museum of Natural History
- Richard Kneedler: president emeritus of Franklin and Marshall College
- Michael Kotlikoff (BA, College class of 1973, D.V.M. Penn Vet class of 1981): provost and acting president (2016); interim president (July 2024 – February 2025), president of Cornell University (as of March 21, 2025)
- Richard W. Lariviere: president, University of Oregon (2009–11)
- Patrick F. Leahy (Doctor of Philosophy from School of Education): 10th president of Monmouth University; sixth president of Wilkes University 2012–2019; 10th president of Monmouth University in West Long Branch, New Jersey since 2019
- Arnold J. Levine: president, Rockefeller University (1998–2002)
- Peter J. Liacouras: president, Temple University (1982–2000)
- John Berrien Lindsley: founded the Medical Department at the University of Nashville (now Vanderbilt University School of Medicine)
- Clyde A. Lynch: president of Lebanon Valley College (1932–1950)
- Qingyun Ma: dean of the University of Southern California School of Architecture (2006– )
- Charles Macalester: namesake and benefactor of Macalester College in St. Paul, Minnesota
- William E. Macaulay: namesake and benefactor of The William E. Macaulay Honors College at the City University of New York
- Joseph McCann: dean of the Davis Business School at Jacksonville University
- George McClellan: founder of Jefferson Medical College, now Thomas Jefferson University
- John McClintock: first president of Drew Theological Seminary (now Drew University)
- Richard Patrick McCormick: chair of the Rutgers College history department (1966–69); dean of Rutgers College (1974–1977)
- John McDowell (Class of 1771): first principal of St. John's College, Annapolis, Maryland (1790–1806)
- Fayette Avery McKenzie: president of Fisk University (1915–25); founder of the Society of American Indians
- Thomas Meredith: a founder of Wake Forest Institute, now Wake Forest University; first president of the institution's Board of Trustees; namesake of North Carolina's Meredith College
- Baidyanath Misra: Fulbright scholar at Wharton School, former vice chancellor of the Odisha University of Agriculture and Technology, chairman of Odisha State Planning Board, and chairman of Odisha's first State Finance Commission
- E. Coppée Mitchell (1836–1887): professor and dean of the University of Pennsylvania Law School (1836–1857)
- James D. Moffat: third president of Washington & Jefferson College
- Edward Mott Moore: former president of the Board of Trustees of the University of Rochester; former president of the American Medical Association; a founder of the New York State Board of Health; "father of the Rochester park system"
- Lewis Baxter Moore: former dean of Howard University's Teachers' College, first African American PhD graduate from UPenn in 1896
- John Morgan (Class of 1757 and 1760): founder of the first medical school in North America; founding member of the American Philosophical Society; surgeon general for the Continental Army during the Revolutionary War
- Kenneth Mortimer: president, University of Hawaii (1993–2001)
- Henry Morton: first president of Stevens Institute of Technology (1870–1902)
- Robert Mundheim (born 1933): dean of the University of Pennsylvania Law School
- Franklin David Murphy: chancellor of the University of Kansas and the University of California, Los Angeles; namesake of Murphy Hall on both campuses
- Daniel F. Muzyka: dean of the Sauder School of Business at the University of British Columbia (1999– )
- Josiah Clark Nott: co-founder of the Medical College of Alabama (now the University of Alabama School of Medicine)
- Merle Middleton Odgers: president, Bucknell University (1954–64)
- B.D. Owens: past president of the University of Tampa and Northwest Missouri State University
- Christopher Stuart Patterson: dean of the University of Pennsylvania Law School
- Laura Perna: Centennial Presidential Professor of Education at the University of Pennsylvania
- Austin Phelps: president of Andover Theological Seminary (1869–79)
- Martha E. Pollack: president of Cornell University (2017– )
- John Edwin Pomfret: president, College of William and Mary (1942–51)
- Edmund T. Pratt Jr.: namesake and benefactor of the Edmund T. Pratt Jr. School of Engineering at Duke University
- Wendell Pritchett: chancellor of Rutgers University–Camden, interim dean and presidential professor at the University of Pennsylvania Law School, and provost of the University of Pennsylvania
- Irvin Reid: first African-American president of Wayne State University (1997–2009)
- Earl S. Richardson: 11th president of Morgan State University (1984–2010)
- Judith Rodin: first female president of an Ivy League university (University of Pennsylvania); president of the Rockefeller Foundation
- Clayton Rose: president of Bowdoin College (2015– )
- Mordechai Rozanski: president of Rider University (2003– ); president of the University of Guelph (Ontario, Canada) (1993–2003)
- L. Timothy Ryan: president, the Culinary Institute of America (2001– )
- Charles Ashmead Schaeffer (Class of 1861): president of the University of Iowa (1887–1898)
- Morton Owen Schapiro (University of Pennsylvania School of Arts and Sciences, 1979, Ph.D.): president, Northwestern University (2009–2022); former president of Williams College
- Samuel Simon Schmucker: founder, Gettysburg College
- Phil Schubert: president of Abilene Christian University (2010– )
- John W. Shumaker: past president of the University of Tennessee, University of Louisville, and Central Connecticut State University
- Henry Slonimsky: dean of the Jewish Institute of Religion
- Rodney K. Smith: president of Southern Virginia University (2004– )
- William Bacon Stevens: first president of the Board of Trustees of Lehigh University
- Richard J. Stonesifer: 5th president of Monmouth University
- John Summerskill: 7th president of San Francisco State University
- Joseph W. Taylor: Penn alumnus, founded Bryn Mawr College through a bequest in his will, 1880
- Asher Tishler: Israeli economist; president of the College of Management Academic Studies
- Roy Vagelos: namesake and benefactor of Columbia University Vagelos College of Physicians and Surgeons
- Terri Vaughan: former Iowa insurance commissioner; dean of Drake University College of Business and Public Administration; author
- Gordon Samuel Watkins: first provost of the University of California, Riverside (1949–56)
- Harry Hillel Wellington: dean of Yale Law School (1975–85) and New York Law School (1992–2000)
- Benjamin West: founder of the Royal Academy of Arts; attended Penn but did not earn a degree
- Hugh Williamson: mathematics professor at Penn; an original trustee of the University of North Carolina; secretary of the trustees in the 1790s; signatory to the US Constitution; represented North Carolina at the Constitutional Convention
- Bernard Wolfman: dean of the University of Pennsylvania Law School and law professor
- Theophilus Adam Wylie: president pro tem of Indiana University (1853 and 1859)
- Keren Yarhi-Milo: Dean of the School of International and Public Affairs (SIPA) and the Adlai E. Stevenson Professor of International Relations at Columbia University
- Mark G. Yudof: president, University of California system (2008–2013); Charles Alan Wright Chair in Law; chancellor, University of Texas System; president, University of Minnesota (1997–2002)
- Larry Zicklin: namesake and benefactor of the Zicklin School of Business at Baruch College
- James A. Zimble: president, Uniformed Services University of the Health Sciences (1991–2004)

== Law professors and legal academics ==
- Khaled Abou El Fadl: professor of law at UCLA School of Law; scholar of Islamic law, immigration, human rights, international and national security law, clerked for Arizona Supreme Court Justice James Moeller, previously taught Islamic law at the University of Texas School of Law at Austin, Yale Law School and Princeton University
- Azizah Y. al-Hibri: professor of law, emerita, at T.C. Williams School of Law, University of Richmond; founding editor of Hypatia: A Journal of Feminist Philosophy; founder and president of KARAMAH: Muslim Women Lawyers for Human Rights; a Fulbright scholar who is a member of the advisory board of various organizations, including the Pew Forum on Religion in Public Life, the Pluralism Project Harvard University, and Religion & Ethics Newsweekly (PBS); appointed by President Barack Obama to serve as a commissioner on the U.S. Commission on International Religious Freedom
- Anthony G. Amsterdam (University of Pennsylvania School of Law Class of 1960): professor of Law at NYU Law School, editor-in-chief of the University of Pennsylvania Law Review
- Loftus Becker (University of Pennsylvania School of Law Class of 1969): editor-in-chief of the University of Pennsylvania Law Review, emeritus professor of Law at the University of Connecticut School of Law, where he teaches criminal law, constitutional law, and a seminar on the Supreme Court; law clerk for Chief Judge David L. Bazelon of the U.S. Court of Appeals for the District of Columbia Circuit, and Justice William J. Brennan, Jr., of the Supreme Court of the United States; taught at the University of Minnesota Law School 1971–1977
- Janice R. Bellace (B.A. College Class of 1971, J.D. Penn Law Class of 1974): former professor of Legal Studies and director of the Huntsman Program in International Studies and Business at the Wharton School of Business; founding president of Singapore Management University; also holds an M.Sc. in industrial relations from the London School of Economics, which she attended as a Thouron Scholar
- Francis Bohlen (1868–1942) (Penn Law Class of 1892, bachelor's degree in Law; Class of 1930, Doctor's Degree in Law): Algernon Sydney Biddle professor of law at the University of Pennsylvania Law School
- Goler Teal Butcher (Penn Law LLM Class of 1958): professor at Howard University Law School and attorney-adviser in the United States Department of State's office of the legal adviser (1963–1971) as the first black person to serve in the legal unit of the State Department legal affairs office
- Robert Butkin: dean of the University of Tulsa College of Law; state treasurer of Oklahoma
- Jesse Choper (University of Pennsylvania School of Law Class of 1960): graduated Order of the Coif in 1960 while teaching courses at the Wharton School; clerked for Chief Justice Earl Warren of the Supreme Court of the United States; former professor at the University of Minnesota Law School; Earl Warren Professor of Public Law and dean (1982–1992) at the University of California, Berkeley Law School
- Douglas Frenkel (Wharton School Class of 1968 B.S. in economics; University of Pennsylvania Law School Class of 1972 J.D.): Morris Shuster Practice Professor of Law at the University of Pennsylvania Law School
- Marci Hamilton (born 1957) (University of Pennsylvania Law School Class of 1988): editor-in-chief of the Law Review; law clerk for Justice Sandra Day O'Connor of the Supreme Court of the United States and Chief Judge Edward R. Becker of the United States Court of Appeals for the Third Circuit; former Paul R. Verkuil Chair of Public Law at the Benjamin N. Cardozo School of Law; presently widely regarded scholar in constitutional law and a Fox Family Pavilion Distinguished Scholar in the Fox Leadership Program at the University of Pennsylvania and the CEO and Academic Director at CHILD USA, an interdisciplinary think tank to prevent child abuse and neglect
- Noyes Leech (1921–2010) (University of Pennsylvania College Class of 1943 BA, and University of Pennsylvania Law School Class of 1948): served as editor-in-chief of the University of Pennsylvania Law Review; reestablished the Mitchell Club as a diverse group of fellow legal students; Ferdinand Wakeman Hubbell Professor of Law and the William A. Schnader Professor of Law at the University of Pennsylvania Law School
- A. Leo Levin (1919–2015) (University of Pennsylvania Law School Class of 1942): editor of the University of Pennsylvania Law Review; Leon Meltzer Professor of Law at the University of Pennsylvania Law School 1949–2014; director of the Federal Judicial Center 1977–1987; vice provost of the University of Pennsylvania; fellow of the American Academy of Arts and Sciences
- Curtis Reitz (born c. 1930): Algernon Sydney Biddle Professor of Law at the University of Pennsylvania Law School
- Louis B. Schwartz (1913–2003): law professor at the University of Pennsylvania Law School
- James Wilson (1742–1798): first professor of Law at University of Pennsylvania, 1789–1798, the only person who signed the United States Declaration of Independence, the United States Constitution, and served as a Supreme Court justice, during the Constitutional Convention, successfully proposed a unitary executive elected through an electoral college system and negotiated the Three-Fifths Compromise, delivered a series of lectures on law to President George Washington, Vice President John Adams, Secretary of State Thomas Jefferson, Secretary of the Treasury Alexander Hamilton, and numerous members of Congress with Wilson's first lecture on law being given to aforementioned government leaders on December 15, 1789
- Bernard Wolfman (1924–2011): dean of the University of Pennsylvania Law School and its Gemmill Professor of Tax Law and Tax Policy, Fessenden Professor of Law Emeritus at Harvard Law School

== Other college educators and scholars ==
- Thomas R. Adams: John Hay Professor of Bibliography and University Bibliographer at Brown University
- Anurag Agrawal: professor of ecology and evolutionary biology at Cornell University
- Mark G. Allen: Joseph M. Pettit Professor in Microelectronics at the Georgia Institute of Technology
- William Alonso: economist and director of the Center for Population Studies at Harvard University, and Richard Saltonstall professor of population policy there
- George Andrews: Evan Pugh Professor of Mathematics at the Pennsylvania State University; member of the National Academy of Sciences; fellow of the American Academy of Arts and Sciences; president of the American Mathematical Society (2008– )
- Edward Arnett: R.J. Reynolds Professor of Chemistry at Duke University; member of the National Academy of Sciences
- Ann Arvin (Penn Med Class of 1972): professor of Pediatrics and microbiology/immunology at Stanford University, expert specialist of the Varicella zoster virus (VZV), chief of the infectious diseases division of pediatrics at the Lucile Packard Children's Hospital, former Stanford vice provost and dean of research
- George Avery: past chair of the Department of Modern Languages at Swarthmore College
- Barbara A. Babcock (1938 –2020) (Penn College for Women Class of 1960): member of Phi Beta Kappa, Woodrow Wilson scholar, and valedictorian; graduated Yale Law School, where she earned the Harlan Fiske Stone Prize for best oral argument in the first year, served as editor of the Yale Law Journal and graduated Order of the Coif in 1963; appointed to the regular faculty, and the first woman to hold an endowed chair and first emerita at Stanford Law School
- E. Digby Baltzell: Penn graduate and sociology professor who popularized the term "WASP"
- Michael Barr: Peter Redpath Emeritus Professor of Pure Mathematics at McGill University
- William M. Bass: forensic anthropologist; founder of the "Body Farm" at the University of Tennessee, Knoxville
- Paul T. Bateman: emeritus professor and past chair of the mathematics department at the University of Illinois
- Daniel A. Baugh: naval historian and former professor of history at both Princeton University and Cornell University
- John Baugh: linguist and Margaret Bush Wilson Professor in Arts and Sciences at Washington University in St. Louis
- Joshua Bennett: professor of Literature and Distinguished Chair of Humanities at MIT; past professor of English and Creative Writing at Dartmouth College
- Elika Bergelson: associate professor of Psychology at Harvard University
- Diana W. Bianchi: Natalie V. Zucker Professor of Pediatrics, Obstetrics, and Gynecology at Tufts University School of Medicine
- Ray Blanchard: professor of psychiatry at the University of Toronto
- Martin J. Blaser: Frederick H. King Professor of Internal Medicine and chairman of the department of medicine at New York University School of Medicine
- Francis Bohlen: Algernon Sydney Biddle professor of law at the University of Pennsylvania Law School
- Herbert Eugene Bolton: past chair of the history department at the University of California, Berkeley
- James Curtis Booth (Class of 1829): Penn professor of chemistry in the Applied Arts, 1850–55; president, American Chemical Society, 1883–85
- Alexei Borodin: Gordon M. Binder/Amgen Professor of Mathematics at the California Institute of Technology; professor at the Massachusetts Institute of Technology
- Charles Bouman: Showalter Professor of Electrical and Computer Engineering and Biomedical Engineering at Purdue University
- John F. Brady: Chevron Professor of Chemical Engineering and executive officer of chemical engineering at the California Institute of Technology
- T. Corey Brennan: chair of the Classics department at Rutgers University
- Michael P. Brenner: Michael F. Cronin Professor of Applied Mathematics and Applied Physics at Harvard University
- Selmer Bringsjord: chair of the Department of Cognitive Science at Rensselaer Polytechnic Institute and a professor of computer science and cognitive science
- Ralph L. Brinster: geneticist; member of the National Academy of Sciences; recipient of the National Medal of Science
- Thomas Brothers: musicologist and professor at Duke University
- Leonard Carlitz: mathematician at Duke University
- Henry H. Carter: professor emeritus of Romance Languages and Literature at the University of Notre Dame and Légion d'honneur recipient
- Britton Chance: scientist and Olympic gold medallist who made great contributions to spectrometry and biochemistry/biophysics research; member of the National Academy of Sciences
- Walter Channing: first professor of Obstetrics and Medical Jurisprudence at Harvard University
- Gretchen Chapman: professor in Social & Decision Sciences at Carnegie Mellon University
- Amy Marie Charles: professor of English literature at the University of North Carolina at Greensboro; scholar of the seventeenth-century English poet George Herbert
- Martha Chen: lecturer in Public Policy, Harvard Kennedy School
- Michael Chernew: professor of Health Care Policy at Harvard Medical School
- Edward Potts Cheyney (Class of 1883): Penn professor of history; author of several college textbooks; past president of the American Historical Association, the oldest and largest U.S. society for scholars and teachers of history
- Carol Chomsky: linguist and education specialist at the Harvard Graduate School of Education
- Noam Chomsky: linguist and activist; MIT professor
- Jack Chow: Distinguished Service Professor of public health at Carnegie Mellon University
- C. West Churchman: philosopher and systems scientist, and professor of Peace and Conflict Studies at the University of California, Berkeley; past president of the International Society for the Systems Sciences
- Gordon Clark: philosopher and Christian theologian; past chair of the philosophy department at Butler University
- Eric H. Cline: chair of the Department of Classical and Near Eastern Languages and Civilizations at George Washington University, and director of the GWU Capitol Archaeological Institute
- Jerry Clinton: Ferdowsi scholar and professor of Persian language and literature at Princeton University
- Thomas C. Cochran: historian and past president of the American Historical Association
- Stanley Norman Cohen: professor of genetics at Stanford University, and recipient of the National Medal of Science
- Tobias Colding: professor of mathematics at MIT; fellow of the American Academy of Arts and Sciences
- Liza Comita: professor of Tropical Forest Ecology at Yale University
- Sarah A. Connolly: professor of virology at Northwestern University
- Thomas F. Cooley: Richard R. West Dean and the Paganelli-Bull professor of economics at the New York University Stern School of Business
- Stanley Corrsin: physicist and Theophilus Halley Smoot Professor of Engineering and chair of the department of mechanical engineering at Johns Hopkins University; member of the National Academy of Engineering
- Edward Samuel Corwin: McCormick Professor of Jurisprudence at Princeton University and past president of the American Political Science Association
- Harvey Cox: theologian; professor, Harvard Divinity School
- Jacqueline Crawley: Robert E. Chason Chair in Translational Research at the University of California, Davis School of Medicine
- Eileen M. Crimmins: Edna M. Jones Professor of Gerontology at the University of Southern California
- Hamid Dabashi: Hagop Kevorkian Professor of Iranian Studies and Comparative Literature at Columbia University
- George F. Dales: past chair of the South and Southeast Asian Studies department at the University of California, Berkeley
- Trevor Darrell: professor and founding co-director, Berkeley Artificial Intelligence Research (BAIR) Center at UC Berkeley
- Christina Davis: curator of poetry at the Woodberry Poetry Room at Harvard University
- John DiIulio: Frederick Fox Leadership Professor of Politics, Religion, and Civil Society, University of Pennsylvania; former director, White House Office of Faith-Based and Community Initiatives
- David Dodd: past professor of finance at Columbia Business School, and co-author of the 1934 book Security Analysis, the longest running investment text ever (and still) published
- Solomon Drowne: prominent physician, academic and surgeon during the American Revolution and in the history of the fledgling US; professor of botany at Brown University, and one of the earliest Fellows there
- Louis Adolphus Duhring: Penn professor of dermatology and founding member and president of the American Dermatological Society
- Isidore Dyen: professor emeritus of Malayo-Polynesian and Comparative Linguistics at Yale University
- Susan Dymecki: professor and director of the Biological and Biomedical Sciences PhD Program at Harvard University
- Gerald Early: Merle Kling Professor of Modern letters, of English, African studies, African American studies, American culture studies; director of Center for Joint Projects in the Humanities and Social Sciences at Washington University in St. Louis
- G. Roger Edwards: archaeologist
- Paul R. Ehrlich: zoologist and Bing Professor of Population Studies in the department of Biological Sciences at Stanford University
- Leon Eisenberg: Maude and Lillian Presley Professor of Social Medicine and Psychiatry emeritus at Harvard Medical School
- Benjamin Elman: Gordon Wu '58 Professor of Chinese Studies at Princeton University
- Hany Farid: William H. Neukom 1964 distinguished professor of computational science at Dartmouth College
- Gary Alan Fine: John Evans Professor of sociology at Northwestern University
- Stanley Fish: Oscar M. Ruebhausen Distinguished Senior Fellow and visiting professor of law at Yale Law School
- Albert Fishlow: professor of international and public affairs and director of the Center for the Study of Brazil at Columbia University
- Joshua Fishman: linguist on sociology of language, bilingualism, Yiddish
- William Fontaine: Penn alumnus and the first tenured African-American professor at Penn; dean of the College of Arts and Sciences (1944–52); one of his students (at Lincoln University where he previously taught) was Kwame Nkrumah, another future Penn alumnus and the first president of Ghana
- William H. Forwood: chairman of the departments of Surgery and Surgical Pathology at Georgetown University, 1895–1897; U.S. Civil War general; Surgeon General of the U.S. Army
- James Alan Fox: criminologist at Northeastern University
- Frances X. Frei: UPS Foundation Professor of Service Management at Harvard Business School
- George Stuart Fullerton: psychologist philosopher; professor, dean and vice-provost at Penn; professor at Columbia University and the University of Vienna; president of the American Psychological Association
- Robert Gallager: professor emeritus of electrical engineering and computer science at the Massachusetts Institute of Technology, and member of the National Academy of Engineering
- Francis Gavin: Frank Stanton Chair in Nuclear Security Policy Studies and professor of political science at MIT; founding director of studies for The Robert S. Strauss Center for International Security and Law and the first Tom Slick Professor of International Affairs at the University of Texas at Austin
- J. Arch Getty: John Simon Guggenheim Memorial Foundation Fellow and professor of history at the University of California, Los Angeles
- Herbert Gintis: behavioral scientist, external professor at Santa Fe Institute
- Ken Goldberg: professor of Industrial Engineering and Operations Research at the University of California, Berkeley
- Marty Golubitsky: Distinguished Professor of mathematics at Ohio State University and the former director of the Mathematical Biosciences Institute
- William Granara: director of the Arabic language program at Harvard University
- Moshe Greenberg: Biblical scholar; recipient of the Israel Prize
- Kali Nicole Gross: African American Studies professor at Emory University
- Edith Grossman: translator of works including Don Quixote and Love in the Time of Cholera
- Alfred Irving Hallowell: anthropologist and past president of the American Anthropological Association; Fellow of the National Academy of Sciences
- Diane F. Halpern: psychologist and professor at Claremont McKenna College; past president of the American Psychological Association
- Alfred Harbage: 20th-century Shakespeare scholar and professor at Harvard University; general editor of the Pelican Books edition of the works of Shakespeare
- Duchess Harris: professor of American Studies at Macalester College in Saint Paul, Minnesota, specializing in feminism, law of the United States, and African-American political movements
- Zellig Harris (1909–1992) (University of Pennsylvania School of Arts and Sciences Class of 1930 BA, Class of 1932 MA, Class of 1934 Ph.D): linguist, mathematical syntactician, and methodologist of science, Semiticist best known for his work in structural linguistics and discourse analysis and for the discovery of transformational structure in language
- Charles Custis Harrison: university provost and industrialist, and recipient of honorary LL.D. degrees from Columbia University, Princeton University and Yale University
- E. Newton Harvey: H.F. Osborn Professor of biology at Princeton University
- Zahi Hawass: Egyptian archaeologist and Egyptologist featured on the History Channel
- Leonard Hayflick: past professor of medical microbiology at Stanford University School of Medicine; past president of the Gerontological Society of America
- Rosemary Hennessy: professor of English and director of the Center for the Study of Women, Gender, and Sexuality at Rice University
- Susannah Heschel: Eli Black Professor of Jewish Studies at Dartmouth College
- Eric J. Hill: professor of architecture at the University of Michigan, Ann Arbor
- Julia Hirschberg: Percy K. and Vida L.W. Hudson Professor of Computer Science at Columbia University
- Teck-Hua Ho: William Halford Jr. Family Professor of Marketing at the Haas School of Business at the University of California, Berkeley
- Urban T. Holmes Jr.: Kenan Professor of Romance Philology at the University of North Carolina, Chapel Hill
- Stephen D. Houston: professor of anthropology and Dupee Family Professor of Social Science at Brown University
- Joan Hutchinson: professor of mathematics at Smith College
- Alice M. Isen: professor of Psychology and Marketing at Cornell University
- Sheena Iyengar: S.T. Lee Professor of Business at Columbia Business School
- Sherman Jackson: King Faisal Chair of Islamic Thought and Culture and professor of Religion and American Studies and Ethnicity at the University of Southern California; past Arthur F. Thurnau Professor of Near Eastern Studies, visiting professor of law and professor of Afro-American studies at the University of Michigan
- Stephen Jaffe: Mary and James H. Semans Professor of Music Composition at Duke University
- Phyllis Kaniss: past executive director of the American Academy of Political and Social Science
- Carl Kaysen: past economics professor at MIT and former director, Institute for Advanced Study in Princeton, New Jersey
- Ann E. Kelley: neuroscientist at the University of Wisconsin titled Wisconsin Distinguished Neuroscience Professor
- Howard Atwood Kelly (Class of 1877 and 1882): one of the first members of Johns Hopkins University medical faculty; internationally renowned surgeon and medical educator; founder of Kensington Hospital in Philadelphia
- Elaine H. Kim: professor of Asian American Studies at the University of California, Berkeley
- Charles P. Kindleberger: economist, economic historian; formerly Ford International Professor of Economics at MIT
- Patrick Vinton Kirch: Class of 1954 Professor of Anthropology at the University of California at Berkeley
- Michael Klarman: Kirkland & Ellis Professor of constitutional law at Harvard Law School
- Michael Klausner: Nancy and Charles Munger Professor of Business and professor of law at Stanford Law School
- Judith Klinman: Chancellor's Professor of chemistry at the University of California, Berkeley; recipient of the National Medal of Science
- S. Rao Kosaraju: Edward J. Schaefer Professor of Engineering at Johns Hopkins University
- Lawrence Kotlikoff: professor of economics at Boston University, and Fellow of the American Academy of Arts and Sciences
- Alan M. Krensky: Shelagh Galligan Professor of Pediatrics at Stanford University
- Michelle Lampl: director of Emory University’s Center for the Study of Human Health and co-director of the Emory-Georgia Tech Predictive Health Institute
- Eugene M. Landis: George Higginson Professor of Physiology and chair of the department of physiology at Harvard Medical School
- Barbara Landau: Dick and Lydia Todd Professor and chair of the cognitive sciences department at Johns Hopkins University
- Joseph Leidy (Class of 1844): "father of American vertebrate paleontology;" professor of anatomy and founder of the department of biology at Penn; professor of natural history at Swarthmore College; subject of 1998 book The Last Man Who Knew Everything
- Aaron Lemonick: past professor of physics at Princeton University, and past chair of the physics department at Haverford College
- Lawrence Lessig: copyright activist; Roy L. Furman Professor of Law at Harvard Law School; founder of Harvard Berkman Center for Internet & Society; former director of the Edward J. Safra Center for Ethics at Harvard
- Arnold J. Levine: past chair of the Molecular Biology department at Princeton University
- Daniel Levy: professor of Medicine at Boston University School of Medicine
- Ralph Linton: Sterling Professor of Anthropology at Yale University
- Xinru Liu: professor emeritus of early Indian and World history at The College of New Jersey
- Robert Loewy: chair of the School of Aerospace Engineering at Georgia Tech; member of the National Academy of Engineering
- Richard Longstreth: architectural historian and professor at George Washington University; past president of the Society of Architectural Historians
- Yueh-Lin Loo: Theodora D. '78 and William H. Walton III '74 Professor of Chemical Engineering at Princeton University
- Louis Loss: William Nelson Cromwell Professor of Law at Harvard Law School (1962–84)
- Helen H. Lu: Percy K. and Vida L. W. Hudson professor of biomedical engineering at Columbia University
- Fred Lukoff: linguist and professor at Yonsei University (Seoul) and the University of Washington (Seattle); Specialist in the Korean language
- Howard Hamilton Mackey: architect, professor and department head at Howard University
- Marvin Makinen: professor in the Department of Biochemistry & Molecular Biology at the University of Chicago; past chairman of the department
- Jen Manion: historian, author, and professor at Amherst College
- Ellen Markman: Lewis M. Terman Professor of Psychology at Stanford University
- Florencia Marotta-Wurgler: professor of law at NYU School of Law
- Kenneth Mayer: professor of Medicine at Harvard Medical School
- Daniel Mazia: past professor of zoology at the University of California, Berkeley and Stanford University; member of the National Academy of Sciences
- Clark McCauley: Rachel C. Hale Professor of Sciences and Mathematics and co-director of the Solomon Asch Center for Study of Ethnopolitical Conflict at Bryn Mawr College
- Susan McIntosh: Herbert S. Autrey Professor of Anthropology at Rice University
- Kathleen McKeown: Henry and Gertrude Rothschild Professor of Computer Science and director of the Institute for Data Sciences and Engineering at Columbia University; past chair of the Department of Computer Science there
- Rogers McVaugh: professor emeritus of botany at the University of Michigan, Ann Arbor
- María Rosa Menocal: Sterling Professor of the Humanities at Yale University
- Barbara Stoler Miller: scholar of Sanskrit literature
- Samuel Miller (Class of 1789): early professor at Princeton Theological Seminary; namesake of Miller Chapel at PTS; trustee of Columbia University and Princeton University; co-founder of the New York Historical Society
- Sidney Morgenbesser: John Dewey Professor of Philosophy at Columbia University
- Frank Moulaert: professor of Spatial Planning at Katholieke Universiteit Leuven, 2008–
- Mohammed Rafique Mughal: professor of Archaeology and Heritage Management and the director of Undergraduate Studies at Boston University
- Alan Needleman: Florence Pirce Grant University Professor of Mechanics of Solids and Structures at Brown University
- Ei-ichi Negishi: Herbert C. Brown Distinguished Professor of Organic Chemistry at Purdue University
- Elissa L. Newport: cognitive scientist; George Eastman Professor of Brain & Cognitive Sciences and Linguistics at the University of Rochester; Fellow of the American Academy of Arts and Sciences
- Susan Nolen-Hoeksema: professor of psychology at Yale University
- Gerald North: professor of atmospheric science at Texas A&M University
- Maurice Obstfeld (Class of 1958): professor of economics at the University of California, Berkeley
- Pezavia O'Connell (1861–1930): past professor at Morgan College (now Morgan State University), the first African-American to earn a PhD (in 1898) in Semitic languages from program then called "Semitics" (now the Department of Near Eastern Languages and Civilization)
- James B. Orlin: Edward Pennell Brooks Professor in Management and professor of Operations Research at the MIT Sloan School of Management
- Daniel Osherson: Henry R. Luce Professor of Psychology at Princeton University
- Mehmet Oz: professor of cardiac surgery at Columbia University
- Joseph Pancoast (Class of 1828): chairman of the Departments of Surgery and Anatomy at Jefferson Medical College, now Thomas Jefferson University
- Frederic L. Paxson: Pulitzer Prize-winning historian; past president of the Organization of American Historians
- Martin A. Pomerantz: physicist; former director of the Bartol Research Institute at the University of Delaware; namesake of the Martin A. Pomerantz astronomical observatory at the Amundsen–Scott South Pole Station; recipient of the NASA Exceptional Scientific Achievement Medal
- Theresa A. Powell: vice president of academic affairs at Temple University
- Gyan Prakash: Dayton-Stockton Professor of History at Princeton University
- Lionel H. Pries: leading University of Washington architecture faculty member and noted Seattle architect
- James B. Pritchard: Penn archeologist honored with the Gold Medal of the Archaeological Institute of America
- Hilary Putnam: Walter Beverly Pearson Professor of Modern Mathematics and Mathematical Logic at Harvard University
- John Quelch: Lincoln Filene Professor of Business Administration at Harvard Business School (2001– )
- Martin Redish: Louis and Harriet Ancel Professor of Law and Public Policy at the Northwestern University School of Law
- Henry Hope Reed: scholar who assisted the poet William Wordsworth in the preparation of an American edition of his works
- Robert Rescorla: psychologist and member of the National Academy of Sciences
- John R. Rickford: J. E. Wallace Sterling Professor of Linguistics and Humanities at Stanford University
- Francesca Rochberg: Catherine and William L. Magistretti Distinguished Professor of Near Eastern Studies at the University of California, Berkeley
- Harold E. Rorschach Jr.: past chair of the physics department at Rice University
- James Francis Ross: past president of the Society for Medieval and Renaissance Philosophy
- Jeanne W. Ross: director of MIT Sloan School's Center for Information Systems Research (CISR),
- Joseph Rothrock: environmentalist; the "father of forestry" in Pennsylvania; taught botany, physiology and anatomy at Pennsylvania State University; founded the Pennsylvania School of Forestry at Mont Alto in 1903, now Penn State Mont Alto; first president of the Pennsylvania Forestry Association
- Dana Royer: professor of paleobotany at Wesleyan University
- Dick Sabot: John J. Gibson Professor emeritus of economics at Williams College
- Anne Salmond: Distinguished Professor of Māori studies and anthropology at the University of Auckland; Fellow of the Royal Society of New Zealand and Dame Commander of the Order of the British Empire
- Stephen Schiffer: Silver Professor of philosophy at New York University
- Peter K. Schott: Juan Trippe Professor of International Economics at the Yale School of Management
- Frank J. Sciulli: former chair of the physics department at Columbia University
- Henry Rogers Seager: former professor of political economy at Columbia University
- Marilyn Shatz: professor emerita of Psychology and Linguistics at the University of Michigan
- Edward Shils: Distinguished Service Professor in the Committee on Social Thought and in sociology at the University of Chicago
- Edward Benjamin Shils: Wharton School Professor of Management; founder of Entrepreneurial Center at Wharton; nephew of Edward Shils
- Charles Wilkins Short (1794–1863) (Penn Med Class of 1815): botanist who discovered several species of plants and has six species of plants named after him; helped organize the Louisville (Kentucky) Medical Institute (now the University of Louisville School of Medicine)
- Benjamin Silliman: Yale University professor of chemistry; founding faculty member of Yale Medical School; studied at Penn under Professor James Woodhouse but did not earn a degree; namesake of Silliman College at Yale
- Alison Simmons: philosopher and Samuel H. Wolcott Professor of Philosophy and Harvard College Professor at Harvard University
- Linda B. Smith: professor of psychology and Cognitive Science at Indiana University, and fellow of the American Academy of Arts and Sciences
- Robert C. Solomon: Quincy Lee Centennial Professor of Philosophy and Business at the University of Texas at Austin
- Raymond James Sontag: Henry Charles Lea Professor of History and chairman of the history department at Princeton University
- Melford Spiro: anthropologist and member of the National Academy of Sciences
- Alfred Stengel (Class of 1889): Penn professor was president of the American College of Physicians and president of the Wistar Institute
- Devin J. Stewart: professor of Islamic studies and Middle Eastern studies at Emory University
- Susan Stewart: poet, Princeton University professor, and member of the American Academy of Arts and Sciences
- George W. Stocking Jr.: professor emeritus of anthropology at the University of Chicago
- Nancy Stokey: Frederick Henry Prince Distinguished Service Professor of Economics at the University of Chicago, and member of the National Academy of Sciences
- Witmer Stone: ornithologist, botanist, and mammalogist, "last of the great naturalists"; president of the American Ornithologists' Union (1920–23); editor of the AOU's periodical The Auk (1912–1936); emeritus director of the Academy of Natural Sciences in Philadelphia
- JoAnne Stubbe: Novartis Professor of Chemistry & Biology at Massachusetts Institute of Technology and member of the National Academy of Sciences; recipient of the National Medal of Science
- Robert Suderburg: former chair of the music department at Williams College
- Robert Swendsen: professor of physics at Carnegie Mellon University
- George W. Taylor: founder of the academic field known as industrial relations, and recipient of the presidential Medal of Freedom
- David Teece: Thomas W. Tusher Chair in Global Business and director of the Institute of Management, Innovation, and Organization at the Haas School of Business, University of California, Berkeley
- Jeff Trinkle: professor and chair of the computer science and engineering department at Lehigh University; past professor and chair of computer science at Rensselaer Polytechnic Institute
- Barry Trost: Tamaki Professor of Humanities and Sciences at Stanford University
- George Truskey: R. Eugene and Susie E. Goodson Professor of Biomedical Engineering in the Pratt School of Engineering at Duke University
- Albert E. Van Dusen: Connecticut state historian and professor of history at the University of Connecticut
- Claude H. Van Tyne: Pulitzer Prize-winning historian at the University of Michigan
- Anthony F. C. Wallace: anthropologist and member of the National Academy of Sciences
- William Ward Watkin: past chair of the architecture department at Rice University
- Sandra Waxman: Louis W. Menk Professor of psychology at Northwestern University
- Russell Weigley: military historian; Distinguished University Professor of History at Temple University
- E. Roy Weintraub: professor of economics at Duke University
- Harvey Weiss: professor of Near Eastern Archeology at Yale University
- Elaine Weyuker: Computer scientist and member of the National Academy of Engineering
- Robin Wilson: fellow at Keble College, Oxford
- Hana Wirth-Nesher: literary scholar and professor of English and American Studies at Tel Aviv University
- Richard R. Wright Jr.: sociologist; president of Wilberforce University
- Amy Wrzesniewski: William H. Jordan Professor of Management at Yale University
- Ray Wu: Liberty Hyde Bailey Professor of Molecular Genetics and Biology at Cornell University
- Richard Wurtman: Cecil H. Green Distinguished Professor at the Massachusetts Institute of Technology
- Glennys Young: chair, University of Washington history department
- Roger Arliner Young (1899–1964) (Ph.D, University of Pennsylvania School of Arts and Sciences, Graduate School Class of 1940): first African American woman to receive a doctorate degree in zoology; assistant professor at the North Carolina College for Negroes (now known as North Carolina Central) and Shaw University (1940–1947); also held teaching positions in Texas, Mississippi and Louisiana; was once jailed for refusing to give up her seat for a white man
- Ji-Yeon Yuh: director of the program in Asian American studies at Northwestern University
- Ahmed Zewail: Linus Pauling Chair Professor of Chemistry and professor of physics at California Institute of Technology
- Maria Zuber: E. A. Griswold Professor of Geophysics at the Massachusetts Institute of Technology, and head of the department of earth, atmospheric, and planetary sciences

== Other educators ==
- John Andrews: principal of The Episcopal Academy in Merion, Pennsylvania (1785–1789); founder of the academy that became York College of Pennsylvania
- Robert Bates: English teacher at Phillips Exeter Academy who made the first ascents of Mount Lucania in Canada and the Ulugh Muztagh in China
- Suresh Kumar Bhatia: chemical engineer, academic, Shanti Swarup Bhatnagar laureate
- Aline Elizabeth Black: African-American educator and focus of a legal case on salary inequality in Virginia
- Anna Robertson Brown Lindsay: first woman to earn a doctorate at the University of Pennsylvania
- A. Felix du Pont: founder of St. Andrew's School in Middletown, Delaware
- Mike Feinberg: co-founder of the Knowledge Is Power Program
- Charlie Brady Hauser: professor of education, Winston-Salem State University
- Deborah Kenny: founder and chief executive of Harlem Village Academies
- Stephen G. Kurtz: historian, principal of Phillips Exeter Academy (1974–1987)
- Gayle Laakmann McDowell: founder, consultant, coder, speaker and author of Cracking the Coding Interview
- Eva Moskowitz: founder of Success Academy in Harlem, New York
- William White (Class of 1765): bishop and founder of The Episcopal Academy in Merion, Pennsylvania
- Robert Woodson, Sr. (born April 8, 1937) (School of Social Policy and Practice Class of 1965 MSW degree): civil rights activist, community development leader, author, and founder and president of the Woodson Center, a nonprofit, nonpartisan research and demonstration organization that supports neighborhood-based initiatives to revitalize low-income communities; awarded in 1990 MacArthur Fellows Program "genius" award, in 2008 Bradley Foundation Prize and 2008 Social Entrepreneurship Award from the Manhattan Institute; in 2020, launched the Woodson Center's 1776 Unites campaign, to counter The 1619 Project
- Peter Zemsky (BA 1988): dean of executive education and Eli Lilly chaired professor of strategy and innovation at INSEAD
