= Duke Smart Home =

Coordinates: 36°0′3″N 78°55′17″W

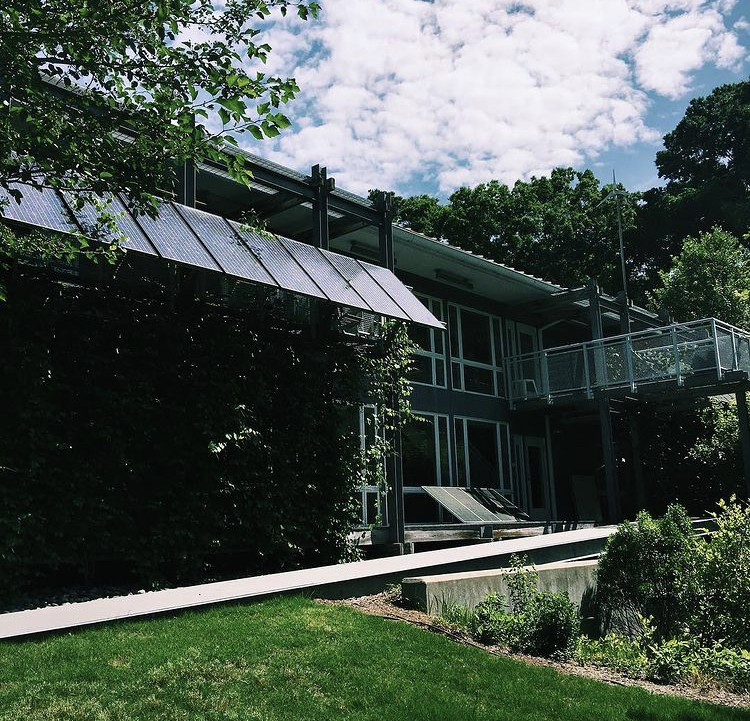
- Duke Smart Home in 2018
- Alternative names: Home Depot Smart Home (former name)

General information
- Address: 1402 Faber St. Durham, NC 27705
- Completed: 2008

Website
- http://dukesmarthome.com: "Home | Duke Smart Home Program". smarthome.duke.edu.

The Duke Smart Home (previously the Home Depot Smart Home) is a live-in laboratory and residence hall at Duke University.

== History ==
In 2003, Mark Younger, an undergraduate student at the Duke University Pratt School of Engineering conceived the idea in a senior thesis.

By 2006, The Home Depot had announced a $2 million sponsorship. At the time, Home Depot's senior vice president of merchandising stated that the Smart Home would help the hardware and furnishings retailer "understand the technology behind these solutions and ultimately to bring this technology to the consumer market."

Construction began in 2007 and the building was opened in 2008. At the time, the building was the first "live-in" smart-home laboratory on a college campus. In the years since, the corporate name was dropped.

In 2018, the Smart Home celebrated its 10-year anniversary.

== Facility ==
The facility is a LEED Platinum certified 6000 square feet residence hall at Duke. The home has a Green Roof which is integrated into the rain-water recollection system, which provides up to 2500 gallons of water for irrigation, toilets, and washing machines. Solar panels provide 100% of the heating needs and more than 30% of the energy used in the house.

The house has living space and laboratories for 10 undergraduates, where they are able to conduct experiments relating to the engineering of smart-homes as every-day life. The university refers to the space as a "living laboratory."
