= The American Journal of Managed Care =

- Discipline: Health care
- Language: English
- Edited by: A.M. Fendrick, M. Chernew

Publication details
- History: 1995 to present
- Frequency: Monthly
- Impact factor: 3.2 (2022)

Standard abbreviations
- ISO 4: Am. J. Manag. Care

Indexing
- ISSN: 1088-0224 (print); 1936-2692 (web)
- OCLC no.: 35837376

Links
- Journal homepage

The American Journal of Managed Care is a monthly peer-reviewed medical journal published by Managed Care & Healthcare Communications. The editors-in-chief are A. Mark Fendrick and Michael E. Chernew. In 2022 it had an impact factor of 3.2.
