= Morris Jastrow Jr. =

Polish-American librarian (1861-1921)

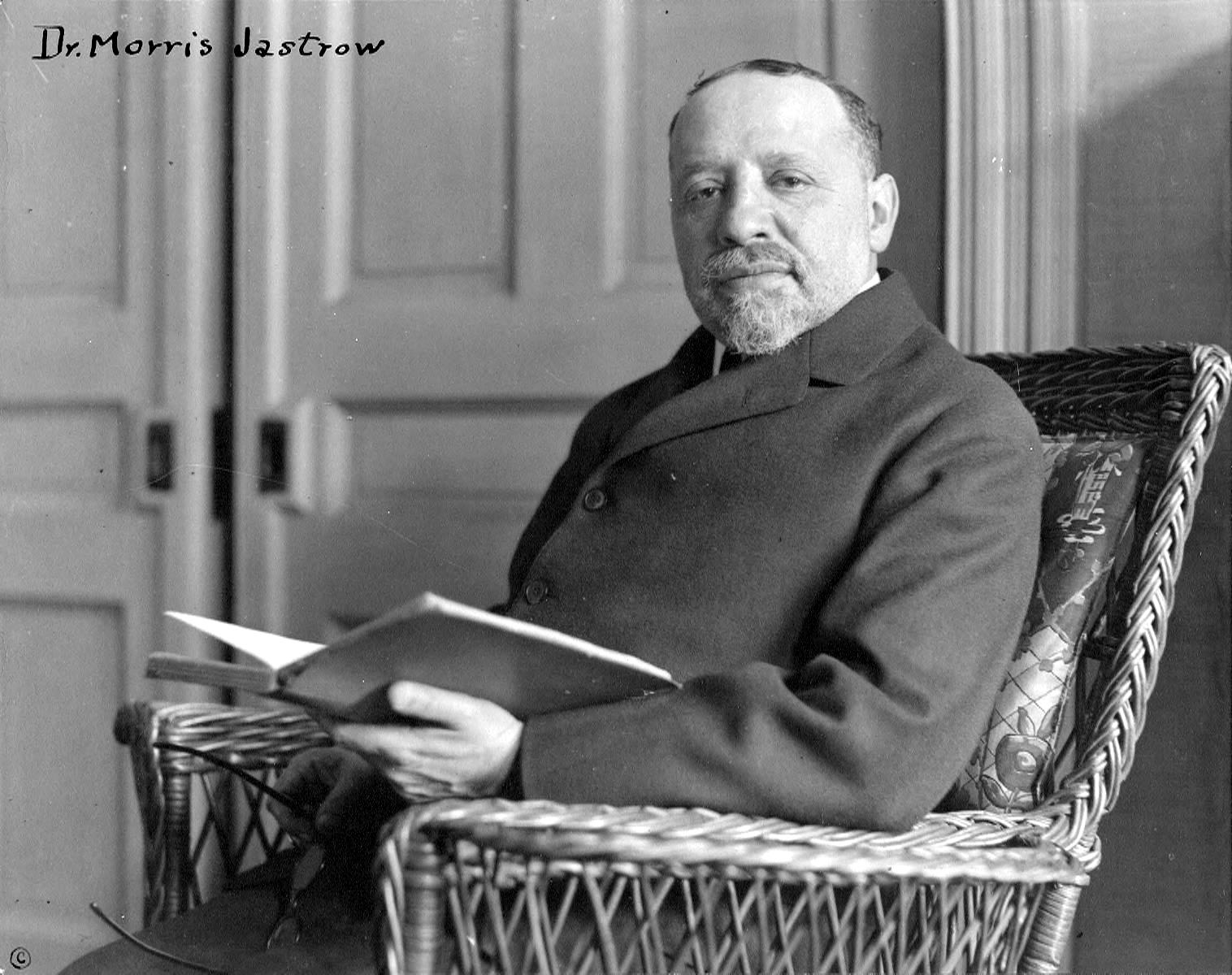

Morris Jastrow Jr. (August 13, 1861 – June 22, 1921) was a Polish-born American orientalist and librarian associated with the University of Pennsylvania.

== Biography ==
He was born in Warsaw in Congress Poland, and came to Philadelphia in 1866 when his father, Marcus Jastrow, a renowned Talmudic scholar, accepted a position as Rabbi of Congregation Rodeph Shalom. He was educated in the schools of Philadelphia and graduated from the University of Pennsylvania in 1881. His original intention was to become a rabbi. For this purpose, he carried on theological studies at the first modern rabbinical seminary in Central Europe, the newly-established Jewish Theological Seminary of Breslau in the equally newly-established German State, while pursuing the study of Semitic languages at German universities.

Jastrow traveled to Europe and studied at Leipzig University, where he received his Ph.D. in 1884. He then spent another year in the study of Semitic languages at the Sorbonne, the Collège de France and the École des Langues Orientales Levant Vivantes. On his return to the United States in 1885, he was appointed assistant to his father in Philadelphia, which position he voluntarily resigned after one year. His farewell sermon, entitled "Jews and Judaism" was understood to be a personal repudiation of traditional Judaism.

Jastrow went on to devote himself entirely to linguistic and archaeological studies and gradually extended his field to include the history of religions. He joined the University of Pennsylvania in 1885 as an instructor of Semitic languages, and became professor of Semitic languages in 1891. In 1888, he became a librarian at the University of Pennsylvania, becoming librarian-in-chief in 1898.

He was president of the American Oriental Society 1914–15, and of the Society of Biblical Literature in 1916. He died in Jenkintown, Pennsylvania, in 1921.

He contributed articles to, and was one of the editors of the scholarly The Jewish Encyclopedia published 1901-1906 by the Jewish Publication Society; he was, as well, a contributor to the Encyclopaedia Biblica (1903), the Encyclopædia Britannica (11th edition), The New International Encyclopedia, and Webster's Dictionary.

He edited a fragment of the Babylonian Dibbarra Epic (1891); the Arabic text of the grammatical treatises of Judah ben David Hayyuj (1897); Selected Essays of James Darmesteter (with a memoir; translation of the essays from the original French by Helen Bachman Jastrow (Mrs. Morris Jastrow, Jr.), 1895); and a series of Handbooks on the History of Religion. A bibliography of his books, monographs and papers, covering the years 1885–1916, was compiled and published (for private circulation) by A. T. Clay and J. A. Montgomery.

Among his students was Pezavia O'Connell, the first African American scholar to earn a PhD in Semitic languages. In 1898, O'Connell wrote a dissertation under Jastrow's supervision at the University of Pennsylvania entitled, Synonyms of the Unclean & the Clean in Hebrew.

== Works ==
- The Religion of Babylonia and Assyria. Boston: Ginn & Company. 1898.
  - Die Religion Babyloniens und Assyriens (in German). Vol. 1. Giessen: J. Ricker'sche Verlagsbuchhandlung. 1905. p. 550. Volume 2 was published in 1912. This work is an enlarged and entirely rewritten German edition of the English edition, together with a separate volume of illustrations bearing on the religion of the Babylonians and Assyrians (3 volumes altogether).
- The Study of Religion. The Contemporary Science Series. London: The Walter Scott Publishing Co., Ltd. 1902. (also published NYC: Charles Scribner's Sons)
- Aspects of Religious Belief and Practice in Babylonia and Assyria. American Lectures on the History of Religions. New York: G. P. Putnam's Sons. 1911.
- Hebrew and Babylonian Traditions. Haskell Lectures at Oberlin. New York: Charles Scribner's Sons. 1914 [1913].
- Babylonian-Assyrian Birth Omens and Their Cultural Significance (1914)
- The Civil Law of Babylonia and Assyria (1915)
- The War and the Baghdad Railroad. Philadelphia and London: J. B. Lippincott Company. 1917.
- The War and the Coming Peace. Philadelphia and London: J. B. Lippincott Company. 1918.
- A Gentle Cynic. Philadelphia and London: J. B. Lippincott Company. 1919.
- Zionism and the Future of Palestine: The Fallacies and Dangers of Political Zionism. New York: Macmillan Company. 1919. LCCN 19010235.
- The Book Of Job Its Origin Growth And Interpretation Together With A New Translation Based On A Revised Text. Philadelphia and London: J. B. Lippincott Company. 1920.
- The Eastern Question and its Solution (1920)
- The Song of Songs. Philadelphia and London: J. B. Lippincott Company. 1921.
- An Assyrian Law Code (1921) Ann Arbor: Journal of the American Oriental Society, 1921.
