= Marotta (disambiguation) =

Marotta is a surname of Italian origin. It may refer to:

== People ==
- Alessandro Marotta (b. 1986), Italian footballer
- Alfonso Marotta (1923–1982), Italian former modern pentathlete
- Alphonse S. Marotta (1934–2024), American politician in Connecticut
- Angelo Marotta (b. 1937), American politician
- Erasmo Marotta (1565–1641), Italian composer
- Florencia Marotta-Wurgler, American lawyer
- Gabriele Marotta (b. 1967), Italian racing driver
- Giuseppe Marotta (b. 1957), Italian football executive
- Giuseppe Marotta (1902–1963), Italian writer
- Ilya Espino de Marotta, Marine engineer and leader of the Panama Canal Expansion Project
- Jerry Marotta (b. 1956), American musician, brother of Rick
- Renato Marotta (b. 1974), Italian actor
- Rich Marotta, American sportscaster
- Rick Marotta (born 1948), American musician, brother of Jerry
- Saverio Marotta (1911–1943), Italian naval officer during World War II
- Ugo Marotta (b. 1942), Brazilian musician
- Vincent Marotta (1924–2015), American businessman, investor and philanthropist

== Other ==
- Marotta, an American aerospace and defence company
- Marotta (village), an Italian village in the province of Pesaro and Urbino, Marche
