= Rebecca Gayle Howell =

American poet

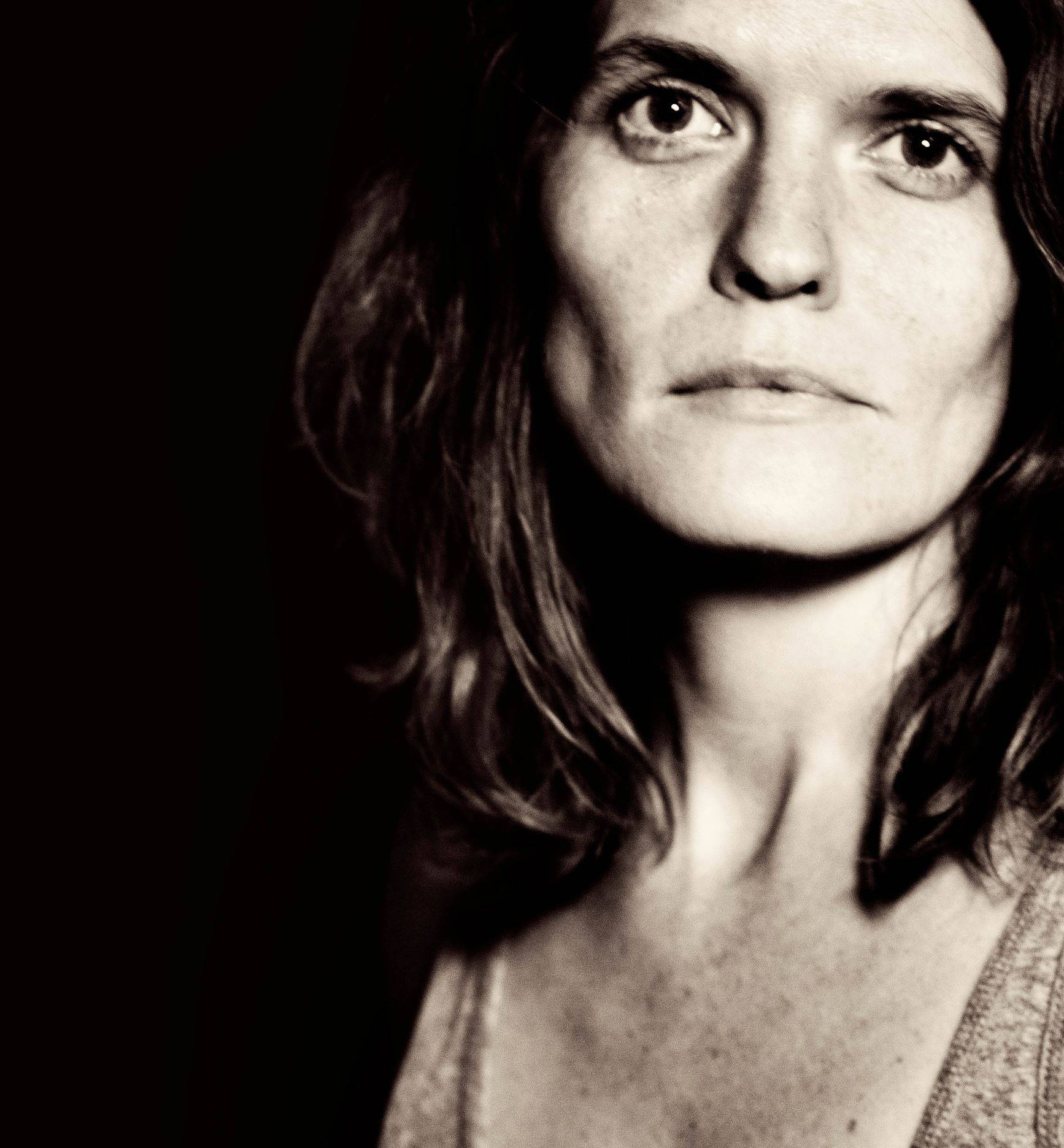
- Credit: Victoria Marie Bee
- Born: August 10, 1975 (age 51); Lexington, Kentucky
- Occupation: Writer
- Writing career
- Movement: Southern

Rebecca Gayle Howell (born August 10, 1975, in Lexington, Kentucky) is an American poet. In 2019, she was named a United States Artists Fellow. In 2025, she received the Aiken Taylor Award for Modern American Poetry.

== Education ==
Howell was born to a working-class family in Lexington, Kentucky, on August 10, 1975. She earned her BA and her MA at the University of Kentucky, her MFA at Drew University, and her PhD at Texas Tech University. Her mentors included Nikky Finney, Wendell Berry, W.S. Merwin, Jean Valentine, Gerald Stern, and Alicia Ostriker.

== Career ==
=== Poetry ===
Howell's first book Render / An Apocalypse was selected by Nick Flynn for the Cleveland State University Poetry Center's First Book Prize (2013). Render / An Apocalypse also received The Nautilus Award, a shortlist for Foreword Review's INDIES Book of the Year, and a cover review in The Los Angeles Times. Burnaway: Art of the South also named it a Best Read of 2016. In 2020 literary critic Jennifer Ashton featured Render / An Apocalypse in her chapter "Ecology, Ethics, and the Apocalyptic Lyric in Recent American Poetry" for Apocalypse in American Literature and Culture (Cambridge University Press). In 2023, Alicia Ostriker wrote a new introduction to the book for its 10th anniversary.

American Purgatory, Howell's second book, was selected by Don Share for The Sexton Prize and was published in both Great Britain and the United States in 2017. American Purgatory was also shortlisted for Foreword Review's INDIES Book of the Year. The book was named a must read by The Courier-Journal, The Millions, and Poetry London. Other reviewers included ArtsATL, Nashville Review, The Arkansas Democrat-Gazette, and The Rumpus.

=== Translations ===
Howell is the English-language translator of Amal al-Jubouri's verse memoir of the Iraq War, Hagar Before the Occupation / Hagar After the Occupation (Alice James Books, 2011). This translation was a finalist for the 2012 Best Translated Book Award and the U.K.'s Banipal Prize for Arabic Literary Translation. International reviewers included The Wall Street Journal's Mint and Asymptote. Hagar received a Best Book of Poetry for 2011 from Library Journal and a Best Book by an Arab Woman from Book Riot in 2017. Howell also translated El interior de la ballena / The belly of the whale, Claudia Prado's award-winning collection of Patagonian agrarian poetry (Texas Tech University Press, 2024).

=== Libretti ===
In 2019, Howell began a collaboration with classical composer Reena Esmail.

A Winter Breviary, their solstice carol cycle, was published by Oxford University Press in 2022. The third of these carols, "The Unexpected Early Hour", was premiered at the Los Angeles Master Chorale Festival of Carols, December 4, 2021, then recorded and broadcast by the BBC on December 24, 2021. In 2022, The Gesualdo Six recorded the entire cycle for Choral Music from Oxford with the Gesualdo Six; in 2023 St. Martin's Choir recorded the cycle as the title tracks for A Winter Breviary: Choral Works for Christmas (Resonus Classics); in 2025, The Sixteen recorded the cycle for their collection The Wise Men and the Star (CORO). In 2023, "The Unexpected Early Hour" was also collected in Carols for Choirs 6 (Oxford University Press).

Say Your Name, their suffrage-rights cantata, was commissioned and premiered by Amherst College Choir and Orchestra and premiered on the East Coast on November 5, 2022, at Amherst College, Amherst, Massachusetts, by Sherezade Panthaki, soprano; Alice Rogers, soprano; Amherst Choir and orchestra, Arianne Abela, conductor. The West Coast premiere took place on April 27, 2024, by the Kirkland Choral Society and Philharmonia Northwest in Seattle, Washington, featuring soloists Stacey Mastrian and Danielle Reutter-Harrah and introduced by Charles Douglas III, Executive Director of Common Power.

=== Editing ===
From 2014 to 2024 Howell served as the poetry editor of Oxford American. She was the second in the magazine's history. During this period she curated a profile of Southern poetics that included new writing by Nathaniel Mackey, Nikki Giovanni, Tarfia Faizullah, Tyehimba Jess, C.D. Wright, Kwame Dawes, Ashley M. Jones, Dean Young, Crystal Wilkinson, Naomi Shihab Nye, Jericho Brown, among many others. In 2016, Howell and her fellow editors received the National Magazine Award for General Excellence, marking the first time in the magazine's 24-year history to receive the award.

What Things Cost: an anthology for the people is co-edited by Howell and Ashley M. Jones, with associate editor Emily Jalloul (University Press of Kentucky, 2023). Called by the publisher "the first major anthology of labor writing in more than a century", What Things Cost received a starred review from Publishers Weekly, a notable anthology of the year by Poetry & Writers, a best poetry book of the year by Ms. Magazine, a best summer read by Bitter Southerner, a best anthology of the year by Book Riot, and a best Southern book of the year by Southern Review of Books. What Things Cost was also named the 2023 INDIES GOLD Best Anthology of the Year by Foreword Reviews.

== Awards ==
- 2025 The Aiken Taylor Award for Modern American Poetry.
- 2023 Foreword Reviews Indies Gold. For What Things Cost: an anthology for the people (University Press of Kentucky, 2023).
- 2019 United States Artists Fellow in Poetry.
- 2016 The Sexton Prize. Selected by Don Share. For American Purgatory (Black Springs Press Group, 2017).
- 2016 Al Smith Individual Artist Fellowship, Kentucky Arts Council.
- 2016 National Magazine Award for General Excellence, shared with the editors of The Oxford American.
- 2015 Carson McCullers Center's Marguerite and Lamar Smith Fellowship.
- 2014 Pushcart Prize. XXXIX. Best of the Small Presses. Edited by Bill Henderson.
- 2014 Poetry Fellow, 2nd year. Selected by C.D. Wright. Fine Arts Work Center. Provincetown, MA.
- 2013 Nautilus Book Award. For Render /An Apocalypse (Cleveland State University Poetry Center, 2013)
- 2012 Cleveland State University Poetry Center First Book Prize. Selected by Nick Flynn. For Render /An Apocalypse (Cleveland State University Poetry Center, 2013).
- 2010 Poetry Fellow. Fine Arts Work Center. Provincetown, MA.

== Works ==
- El interior de la ballena / The belly of the whale, poems by Claudia Prado and translated by Rebecca Gayle Howell (Texas Tech University Press, 2024).
- What Things Cost: an anthology for the people, co-edited by Rebecca Gayle Howell & Ashley M. Jones. Associate Editor, Emily Jalloul. (University Press of Kentucky, 2023).
- A Winter Breviary, written by Rebecca Gayle Howell, composed by Reena Esmail. (Oxford University Press, 2022).
- Say Your Name, written by Rebecca Gayle Howell, composed by Reena Esmail. (A Piece of Sky Music, 2022).
- American Purgatory, poems by Rebecca Gayle Howell. (Black Spring Press Group, 2017).
- Render / An Apocalypse, poems by Rebecca Gayle Howell. (Cleveland State University Poetry Center, 2013).
- Hagar Before the Occupation / Hagar After the Occupation, poems by Amal al-Jubouri and translated by Rebecca Gayle Howell with Husam Qaisi. (Alice James Books, 2011).
