= Bergelson =

Bergelson may refer to:

- David Bergelson, Soviet Yiddish language writer
- Vitaly Bergelson, US mathematical researcher
- Elika Bergelson, US linguist
