= Commission on Social Welfare =

Commission in Ireland

The Commission on Social Welfare (CSW) was a commission in Ireland that from 1983 to 1986 reviewed social welfare in the country. Social security policy between 1987 and 1994 was heavily influenced by the findings of the CSW.

The final report of the Commission recommended raising social welfare payments. For social welfare payments to be adequate, they "must prevent poverty, and in our view poverty must be judged in the light of actual living standards," the report concluded.

== Background ==
A social welfare provision refers to any program which seeks to provide a minimum level of income, service or other support for many marginalized groups such as the poor, elderly, and disabled people. Social welfare programs are undertaken by governments as well as non-governmental organizations (NGO's). Social welfare payments and services are typically provided at the expense of taxpayers generally, funded by benefactors, or by compulsory enrollment of the poor themselves.

== Establishment ==
In 1982 the National Social Services Board in its pre-budget submission called for the establishment of a commission to carry out a fundamental review of the social welfare system. A commitment to establish such a commission was part of the program of the Fine Gael/Labour coalition government that came into office in December 1982. The Commission on Social Welfare was established in 1983.

== Commission report ==
The Commission's report was published in 1986. The reforms recommended were within the existing system rather than replacing the system and creating a new one. The four key reforms proposed by the Commission concerned the payment structure, social insurance, social assistance and financing.

The adequacy of payments was the most important issue the Commission considered. By using a number of indicators, the Commission estimated that a minimally adequate income for a single person in 1985 was 50 to 60 pounds per week.

The Commission favored keeping the social insurance system. It recommended that all income earners should contribute to and benefit where appropriate from social insurance and favored a widening of coverage for insurance.

The Commission recommended that there should be a comprehensive social assistance scheme for those who, for whatever reason, do not qualify for social insurance. The main condition would be the establishment of an income.

On the grounds of redistribution the Commission concluded that the income ceiling on contributions should be gradually abolished.
