= Joseph McCann =

Joseph McCann may refer to:

- Joseph McCann (academic) (1946–2015), American academic administrator
- Joseph McCann (criminal) (born 1985), British rapist
- Joseph McCann (diver) (1925–1989), Australian diver
