= William A. Hawkins (businessman) =

American businessman

- Education: Duke University (B.S.); University of Virginia (M.B.A)
- Known for: Chairman and CEO of Medtronic

William "Bill" A. Hawkins (born 1954) was the chairman and chief executive officer of Medtronic from 2008 until 2011.

== Early life ==
Hawkins received a Bachelor of Science degree in electrical and biomedical engineering from Duke University in 1976. He also earned an MBA from University of Virginia's Darden School of Business in 1982.

== Career ==
Following his graduation from Duke, Hawkins began his medical technology career with Carolina Medical Electronics in 1977. Prior to joining Medtronic in 2002, Hawkins was the president and CEO of Novoste from 1998 to 2002.

Hawkins is a member of the board of visitors of Duke's engineering school.

In 2016, he was elected a member of the National Academy of Engineering for leadership in biomedical engineering and translational medicine.
