= E. Spencer Miller =

American lawyer (1817–1879)

Dean of the University of Pennsylvania Law School
- In office 1868 – June 4, 1872
- Preceded by: George Sharswood
- Succeeded by: E. Coppée Mitchell

Personal details
- Born: Elihu Spencer Miller; September 3, 1817 Princeton, New Jersey, US
- Died: March 6, 1879 (aged 61) Philadelphia, Pennsylvania, US
- Resting place: Laurel Hill Cemetery
- Education: Princeton University

Elihu Spencer Miller (September 3, 1817 – March 6, 1879) was an American lawyer. He was Dean of the University of Pennsylvania Law School.

== Biography ==
Miller was born on September 3, 1817, in Princeton, New Jersey, a son of Rev. Samuel Miller. He attended the College of New Jersey (since renamed as Princeton University), graduating in 1836. He trained as a lawyer in Princeton and Baltimore, and after passing the bar, moved to Philadelphia in 1843, setting up a practice. For a time he served as assistant city solicitor, under Charles F. Warnick.

In 1852, Miller was a professor of real estate, conveyancing, and equity, at the University of Pennsylvania Law School. He was elected to the American Philosophical Society in 1857. During the American Civil War, he raised an independent company of Pennsylvania National Guard Artillery ("Miller's Battery"), and served as its Captain from its muster in on June 19, 1863, until it was mustered out on July 25, 1863.

Miller was Dean of the University of Pennsylvania Law School from 1868 until he resigned on June 4, 1872, in line with his objection and opposition to the law school being moved to West Philadelphia. Miller died on March 6, 1879, aged 61, in Philadelphia, and was interred at Laurel Hill Cemetery.

| Preceded by George Sharswood | Dean of the University of Pennsylvania Law School; 1868–1872 | Succeeded by E. Coppée Mitchell |
