= George Edward Woodberry =

American poet

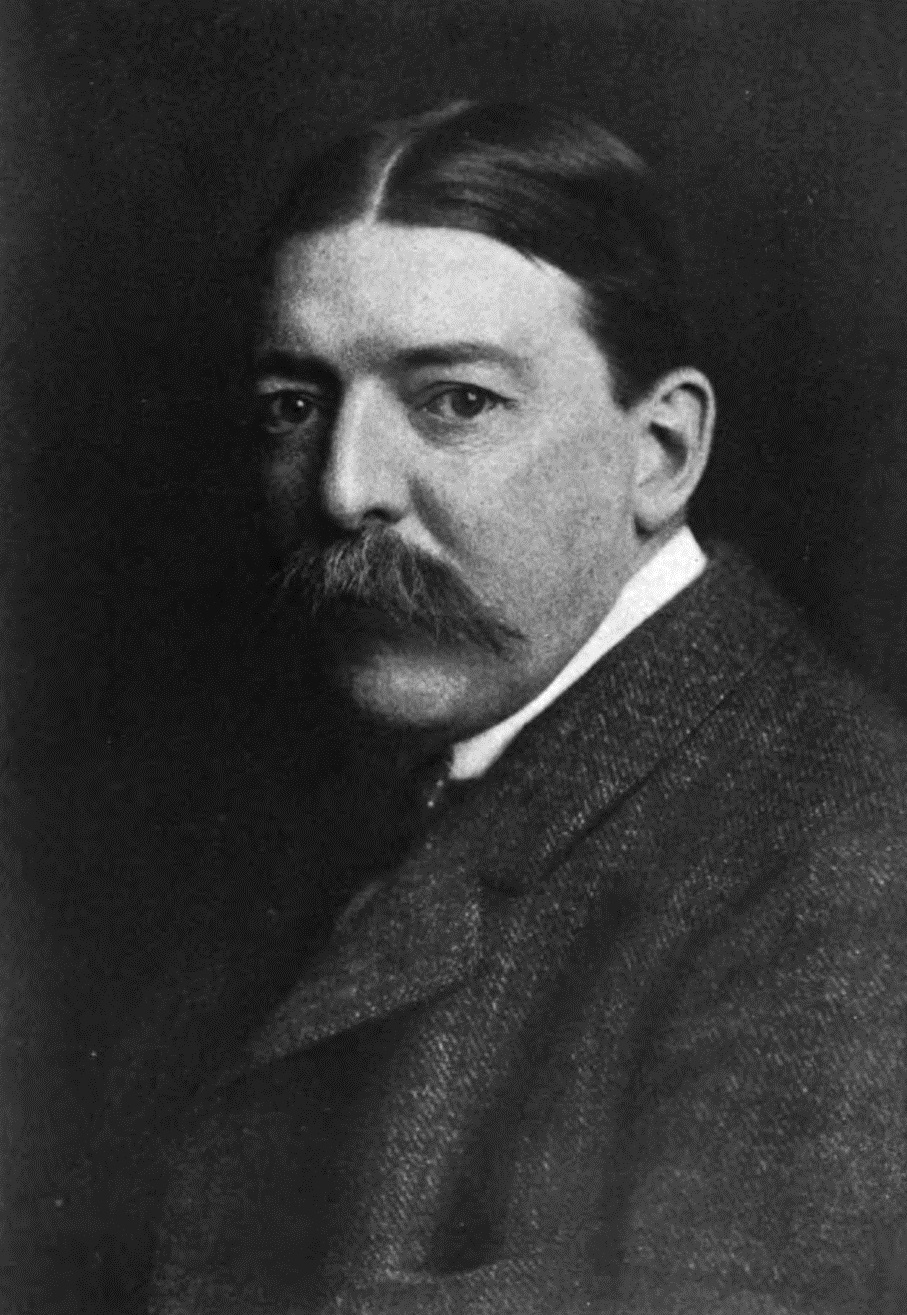
George E. Woodberry

George Edward Woodberry, Litt. D., LL. D. (May 12, 1855 – January 2, 1930) was an American literary critic and poet.

== Biography ==
=== Education ===
Woodberry was born in Beverly, Massachusetts, on May 12, 1855. The Woodberrys or Woodburys—various spellings of the name exist—immigrated early and, since settlement took root on the North Shore, have been native to Beverly and neighboring seaport towns. Receiving his preparation at the Phillips Exeter Academy, he entered Harvard College in 1872. He was unable to finish his class, though, due to his poor health. He returned in 1875, and he earned his degree in 1877. Woodberry took highest final honors in philosophy, and was awarded an Oration at Commencement. This essay, on the "Relation of Pallas Athene to Athens", owes its preservation in a permanent form to the fact that he was forbidden to deliver it, because of the disapproval of its substance by the Committee of the Faculty in charge. His college friends asked his consent to print for him a small edition, copies of which are now rare. This and his early college poems, of which there is a selection in ‘’Verses from the Harvard Advocate’’ (1876), were his first-fruits.

=== Professorship ===
In 1877-78 he was acting Professor of English and History in the University of Nebraska. In 1878 he went to New York as an assistant editor on The Nation, and in the following year, moved to Cambridge, where he continued his editorial work, besides contributing to the Atlantic Monthly and Harper's. In 1880 he was recalled to Nebraska, where for two years he held the English professorship; but at the end of that time, together with several associates in the Faculty, he was dismissed from his chair, as a result of one of those contests usual in the early life of Western colleges.

=== Works ===
In the fall of 1882, the History of Wood-Engraving (Harpers) appeared, written, not in a technical manner, but in pleasing, cultivated sympathy with the subject as a study in art. The next two years were quietly but busily spent in Beverly. The North Shore Watch: a Threnody, was first printed in 1883 in a private edition of two hundred copies. His Edgar Allan Poe, one of the marked successes of the "American Men of Letters Series", was published two years later. It made Woodberry a recognized authority on Poe, and did a true service to American literature in dispelling some myths of popular tradition.

Woodberry went to Italy in 1885, but soon returned, apparently disheartened with his journey, in which he saw much in foreign conditions of life to distress and disturb him. Soon after this experience, came his My Country. It first appeared in a very limited separate impression; then in the Atlantic Monthly and in 1888, Professor John K. Paine, using the poem as a libretto, composed a cantata, A Song of Praise, which was performed at the Festival at Cincinnati in that year. Woodberry again visited Italy in the winter of 1888–89, this time in happier mood. During 1890, the North Shore Watch, and Other Poems, and Studies in Letters and Life were published.

For twelve years, Woodberry was an almost constant writer to the literary portion of The Nation. He also, during Aldrich's editorship, was anonymously, and for this reason able, the more forcibly, to assert his critical strength in the Atlantic Monthly. He contributed one paper to the Fortnightly Review in 1882, and during 1888 wrote regularly, mostly upon literary topics, for the Boston Post. He contributed the entry on American Literature to the 11th edition of the Encyclopædia Britannica (1910) under the initials "G.E.W.".

In 1891–1904 he was professor of comparative literature at Columbia University. He was elected to the American Academy of Arts and Letters. He wrote a number of books as well. After his death in 1930, he was posthumously awarded one of the first three Frost Medals for lifetime achievement in poetry by the Poetry Society of America. The Woodberry Poetry Room at Harvard University is named in his honor.

=== At home ===
His summers were spent in Beverly, his winters in Boston, where he lived quietly among a few friends.

“The critical reach of Mr. Woodberry's mind is well shown in the soundness and judgment of the study of Poe, in the essay on Keats, in the remarkable paper on the Byron centenary, and in the sober admiration for Shelley shot through nearly all he has written. In the Threnody, in his sonnets, and single poems like "Victor's Bird," we learn something of his strength and sweetness. It has been said of his poetry that there is no "love" in it, and yet the work of his fullest expression, "Agathon", is wholly of Love. The spirit of beauty, and a zeal for a wisely tempered democracy—these are on every page. In his prose he seems to deliver the burden of what he feels that he ought to say, whether in softness or in firmness; in his verses one may easily discover what most the poet cherishes. He takes nobody by storm; like the kingdom of heaven, but unlike so many of his craft, he does not come by violence, either in his personal appearance and manners or in the structure and form of his thought.”

== Selected list of works ==
- A History of Wood-engraving (1883)
- Studies in Letters and Life (1890)
- Heart of Man (1899)
- Wild Eden (1899)
- Makers of Literature (1900)
- Nathaniel Hawthorne (1902)
- America in Literature (1903)
- Swinburne (1905)
- The Torch: Eight Lectures on Race Power in Literature (1905)
- Emerson (1907)
- The Appreciation of Literature (1907)
- Great Writers (1907)
- Life of Poe (two volumes, 1909)
- The Inspiration of Poetry (1910)
- Wendell Phillips (1912)
- A Day at Castrogiovanni (1912)
- North Africa and the Desert (1914)
- Two Phases of Criticism (1914)
- Ideal Passion | Sonnets (1917)

Other publications:

- Edgar Allan Poe in the "American Men of Letters" series (1885)
- The North Shore Watch, and Other Poems (1890)
- Works of Edgar Allan Poe (ten volumes, 1895) With Edmund Clarence Stedman
- Collected Poems (1903)
- The Kingdom of All Souls, poems, (1912)
- The Flight and Other Poems (1914)

He edited The complete Poetical Works of Percy Bysshe Shelley (1892); Lamb's Essays of Elia (1892); The Works of Edgar Allan Poe, with E. C. Stedman (1895); and Select Poems of Aubrey de Vere (1894). He wrote compositions in the "National Studies in American Letters," and Columbia University Studies in Comparative Literature, (nine volumes).

== Quotes ==
"Defeat is not the worst of failures. Not to have tried is the true failure..."

"The sense that someone else cares always helps, because it is the sense of love"

"If you can't have faith in what is held up to you for faith, you must find things to believe in yourself, for a life without faith in something is too narrow a space to live."
