= W. J. Seeley =

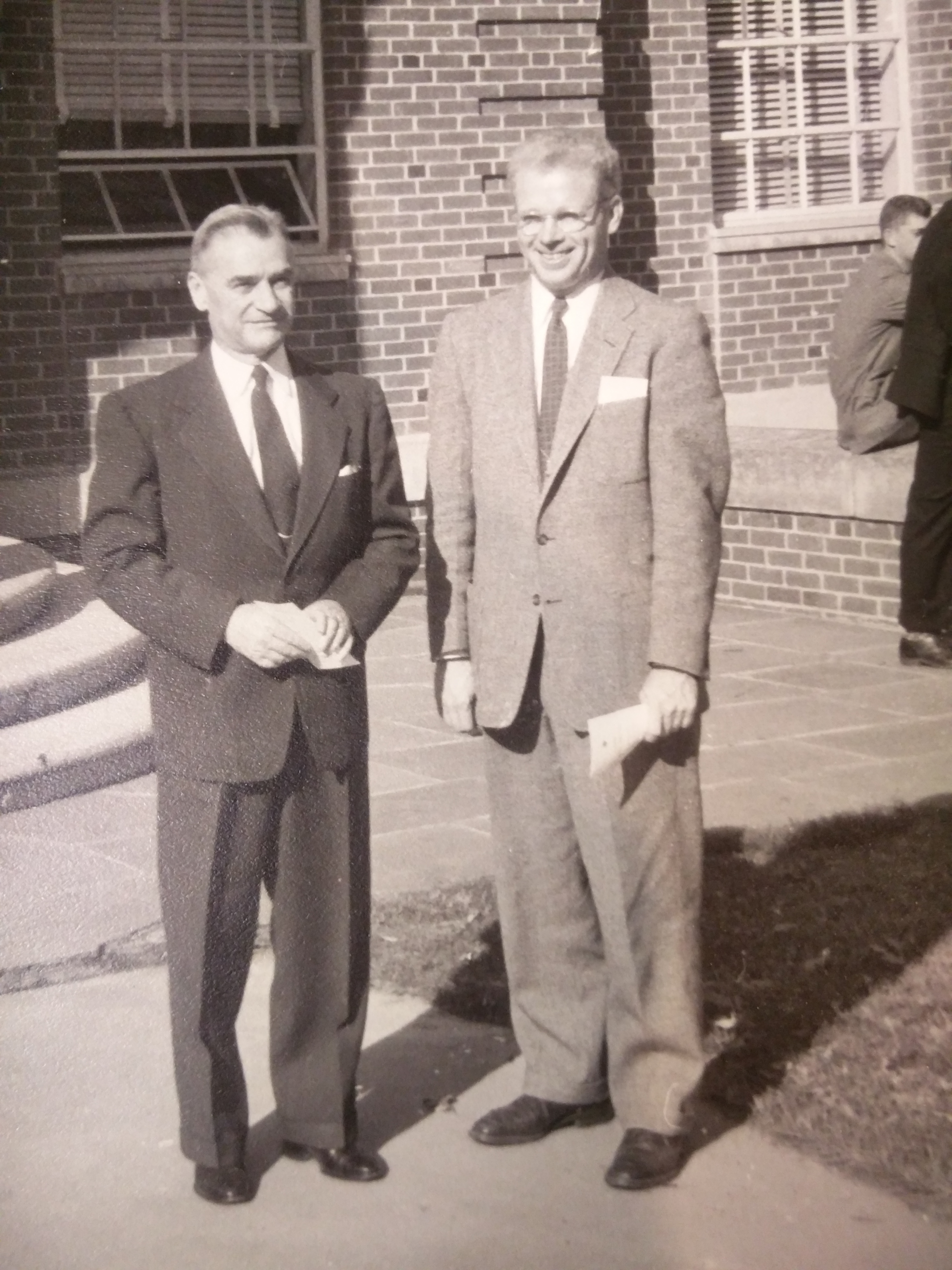
W. J. Seeley (left) and unknown colleague

Walter J. Seeley (died July 29, 1974) served as the Dean of Duke University's Edmund T. Pratt Jr. School of Engineering from 1953 until 1963. He also served as chairman of the Electrical Engineering Department at Duke University. He was formerly an engineering professor at University of Pennsylvania. During World War II, he served as Director of the Naval Ordnance Laboratory. He graduated from the Polytechnic Institute of Brooklyn (now New York University Tandon School of Engineering). The Walter J. Seeley Scholastic Award is awarded annually at Duke University to the member of the graduating class of the Edmund T. Pratt Jr. School of Engineering who has achieved the highest scholastic average in all subjects.

Seeley died in July 1974 at the age of 79.
