= Signal49 Research =

Independent nonprofit applied research organization

- Type: Nonprofit applied research organization
- Legal status: Nonprofit with charitable status
- Purpose: Mission to provide Canada's leaders with research insights to inform evidence-based decision-making
- Headquarters: Ottawa, Ontario, Canada
- Region served: Canada
- Official language: English; French
- President and chief executive officer: Susan Black
- Staff: 200
- Website: www.signal49.ca

Signal49 Research is Canadian applied-research organization that focuses economics, human capital, innovation and technology, education, health, sustainability, Indigenous and northern communities, and immigration.

In the economics forecasting space, Signal49 Research produces medium and long-term outlooks on the national, local, and industrial economies, as well as proprietary economic indicators and custom economic analyses.

The organization traces its origins to 1954 as a division of the American National Industrial Conference Board, now known as the Conference Board. In 1980 the name was licensed to an outside body; in 2026 the larger Conference Board took back the name and the existing licensee started operating as "Signal49 Research".

The organization is headquartered in Ottawa, but moved to being fully remote during the pandemic, and has employees located across the country. Susan Black is the President and chief executive officer of Signal49.

== Past presidents ==
- Daniel Muzyka 2012–2018
- Anne Golden 2001–2012
- James R. Nininger 1978–2001
- Robert de Cotret 1976–1978
- Arthur J.R. Smith 1971–1976
- Monteath Douglas 1954–1971

== Services ==
- In-Fact: Research reports, webinars and conference proceedings available to subscribers.
- e-Data: Data underlying Signal49 Research's economic forecasts. U.S., Canadian, Provincial, Territorial, 24 Canadian Census Metropolitan Areas, and 16 Canadian Industries.
- Networks: Executive networks, councils, centres and working groups on various topics.
- Custom Research
- Research Centres: Canadian Centre for the Innovation Economy, Centre for Business Insights on Immigration, Centre for the North, National Immigration Centre, Value Based Healthcare Canada, Workplace Mental Health Research Centre

== Select research publications ==
- ChatGPT: Organizational and Labour Implications (2023)
- Cracking the Productivity Code: Charting a New Path to Prosperity (2024)
- Skills and Productivity: Which Skills Shortages Are Impacting Canadian Productivity? (2024)
- Transformation Towards Value-Based Healthcare in Canada: Focal Points for System-Wide Implementation (2024)
- C-Suite Challenge 2024: Toward Stability and Renewal (2024)
- Small Business, Big Impacts: Immigrant Hiring and Integration in Five Canadian Cities (2024)
- Opportunity for All: Improving Workplace Experiences and Career Outcomes for Canadians With Disabilities (2023)
- The Next Frontier in Canada’s Agri-Food Sector: Technology-Driven Labour and Skills Transitions (2024)
- Toward a Disaster Recovery Framework for Canada: Insights from the United States, Australia and New Zealand (2024)

== Controversies ==
In May 2009, the organization was criticised over its claim to be objective and non-partisan. It released a report related to copyright regulations in Canada, which plagiarised papers published by the International Intellectual Property Alliance (the primary movie, music, and software lobby in the US). The organization responded, standing by its report, which drew further criticism, claiming they ignored a commissioned report for partisan reasons. The reports were recalled after internal review, which determined that there was undue reliance on feedback from a funder of the report. The organization hosted a roundtable discussion on intellectual property in September 2009 and published a new report, Intellectual Property in the 21st Century, in February 2010.

In November 2016, a recording surfaced of Michael Bloom, the vice-president, which contained a number of generalizing statements about Indigenous peoples, people of Caribbean, Asian, and Middle-Eastern descent. The statements were made in the presence of an employee of Indigenous heritage. Upon learning of the recording, the organization placed the vice-president on immediate leave of absence and initiated an internal investigation. Shortly after the recording was made public, it was further revealed that a former employee who worked under Bloom commenced legal action against the organization. This employee, also of Indigenous heritage, and alleged a "toxic work environment". A lawsuit was filed in Ontario seeking $175,000 in damages.
