= Kenneth Mayer =

Kenneth Hugh Mayer is a Professor of Medicine at Harvard Medical School. He is the Medical Research Director and the co-chair of the Fenway Institute. Mayer is also a professor in the Department of Global Health and Population at the Harvard School of Public Health, the Director of HIV Prevention Research and Attending Physician at Beth Israel Lahey Health, and an adjunct professor of Medicine and Community Health at Brown University.

== Early life ==
Kenneth Mayer earned his BA in 1972 from the University of Pennsylvania and later completed his MD from Northwestern University in 1977.

== Career ==
Kenneth Mayer's active interests lie in international medicine. His research interests include HIV/AIDS, gay and bisexual men's health, HIV/AIDS prevention and treatment, microbicides, PrEP, PEP, vaccines, secondary prevention, and antibiotic use and molecular epidemiology of antibiotic resistance. Mayer authored The Fenway Guide to Lesbian, Gay, Bisexual, and Transgender Health.

== Recognition ==
- 2001 Dean's Teaching Excellence Award, Brown Medical School, Brown University, Providence, RI
- 2001 Paul J. Galkin Lecturer for Distinguished Leadership in HIV/AIDS, Brown University, Providence, RI.
- 2002 Honorary life membership of The Indian Medical Association, Chennai Central Branch, India
- 2002 Medical Achievement Award, AIDS Project Rhode Island Annual Meeting, Warwick, RI
- 2003 Listed in Best Doctors in America 2003-2004
