= Peter K. Schott =

American economist

Peter K. Schott is an American economist, currently the Juan Trippe Professor at Yale School of Management.
