= Dana Royer =

Dana Leviticus Royer is a geoscientist specializing in paleobotany at Wesleyan University.

== Education ==
Royer attended the University of Pennsylvania and received his PhD from Yale University, studying under Leo Hickey and Robert Berner. He also studied with David Beerling at the University of Sheffield.

== Academic career and research ==
Royer has made several contributions in the geosciences, including using leaf size and shape to reconstruct paleoclimates, using the stomatal distributions of plants to reconstruct ancient levels of atmospheric carbon dioxide, and doing extensive work on the correlation between atmospheric CO_{2} and temperature over geologic timescales. He has been a Geological Society of America Fellow since 2011.

He co-authored a paper in 2008 with climate scientist James Hansen and others that suggested humanity aim for 350 parts per million CO_{2} in the atmosphere to avoid climate change that could threaten human civilization. This has been widely cited and was reported on by several media outlets.

== Awards and honors ==
Geological Society of America - 2010 Donath Medal
