= Christina Davis (poet) =

American poet

Christina Davis is an American poet most notably recognized for two collections of poetry that deal with philosophically questioning common ideas and emotions: An Ethic, published in 2013, and Forth A Raven, published in 2006. In An Ethic, Davis addresses the grief and darkness of a father's death, the challenges of conventional constructs of life on earth and an afterlife somewhere else. This seems to be a theme building on ideas she explored in Forth A Raven. She phases it simply as "There is no this or that world." As one reviewer wrote, "What follows is a rigorous meditation on this premise, a refusal of the notion that one passes from presence into absence, from life into death, as if by bridge or tunnel. Rather, presence and absence, life and death, coexist—and we are daily challenged to reconcile their simultaneity."

== Life ==
She graduated from the University of Pennsylvania and the University of Oxford.

She lived in New York City, where she worked for the Poetry Society of America, Teachers & Writers Collaborative, New York University, and Poets House.

Her poems have appeared in American Poetry Review, Boston Review, Jubilat, the New Republic, Pleiades, and the Paris Review. She was on a "Louder Than Words" panel at the 2009 Association of Writers & Writing Programs. Her first collection, Forth A Raven, was published in 2006 by Alice James Books, and her second collection, An Ethic, in 2013 by Nightboat.

She currently lives in Cambridge, Massachusetts. She is curator of poetry at the Woodberry Poetry Room at Harvard University.

== Awards ==
- Residencies from Yaddo and the MacDowell Colony and 2010 James Merrill House Fellow
- 2009 Witter Bynner Fellowship

== Works ==
- Forth A Raven. Alice James Books. 2006. ISBN 978-1-882295-57-9.
- An Ethic, selected and with an introduction by Forrest Gander (Nightboat, 2013)

=== Editor ===
- Christina Davis; Christopher Edgar, eds. (2004). Illuminations: Great Writers on Writing. Carcanet Press Ltd. ISBN 978-1-85754-780-1.
