= George Truskey =

George Alexander Truskey
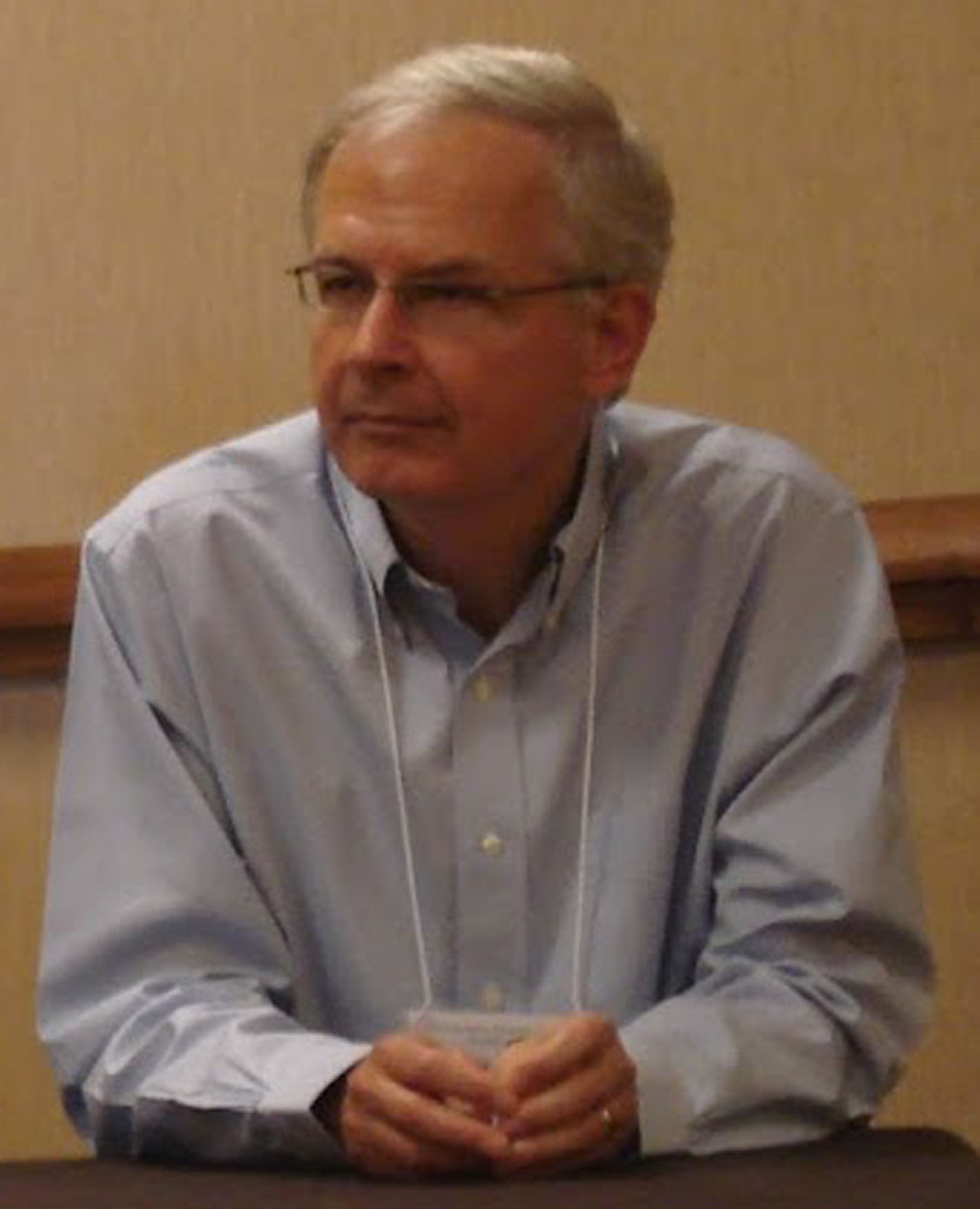
- Born: February 14, 1957 (age 69); Pennsylvania, US
- Education: Massachusetts Institute of Technology; University of Pennsylvania
- Known for: transport phenomena cardiovascular tissue engineering cell adhesion atherosclerosis
- Awards: American Heart Association Fellow (1999); AIMBE Fellow (1999); BMES Fellow (2006)
- Scientific career
- Fields: Biomedical Engineering
- Workplaces: Duke University
- Doctoral advisor: Clark K. Colton
- Website: Truskey Lab Website

George Alexander Truskey is an American biomedical engineer noted for his research on transport phenomena in biological systems, cardiovascular tissue engineering, and cell adhesion to natural and synthetic surfaces.

== Biography ==
Truskey received his B.S.E. in Bioengineering from the University of Pennsylvania in 1979. He then received his Ph.D. in Chemical Engineering from the Massachusetts Institute of Technology in 1985 under the direction of Clark K. Colton. Upon graduation, he became a research fellow at Brigham and Women's Hospital in Experimental Pathology, as well as an assistant professor in the Department of Chemical Engineering at Tufts University. In 1987, he joined the faculty at Duke University as an assistant professor of Biomedical Engineering. From 2008 to 2010, he was the president of the Biomedical Engineering Society (BMES). He is the current R. Eugene and Susie E. Goodson Professor of Biomedical Engineering and the senior associate dean of research in the Pratt School of Engineering. In 2014, he successfully chaired the committee to appoint a new provost for Duke University.

== Notable research contributions ==
Truskey is the author of over 100 peer-reviewed research publications, a biomedical engineering textbook entitled Transport Phenomena in Biological Systems, over 6 book chapters, and over 180 research abstracts and presentations. His textbook has received positive feedback, with reviewers stating "While there are several other excellent books available on 'Transport Phenomena,' this is the only one that truly integrates biomedical engineering and physiology with basic principles of transport phenomena in a comprehensive manner." He directed Duke University's Translational Research Partnership with the Coulter Foundation, which added $10 million to the endowment of Duke's Pratt School of Engineering. The goal of the partnership is to promote translational research in Biomedical Engineering.

== Current research ==
In 2012, Truskey was awarded 1 of 12 awards for NIH's new Tissue Chip and Drug Screening initiative. These projects were also featured in a special supplement in Stem Cell Research and Therapy. His current research also includes point-of-care endothelial cell seeding of nitinol stents and titanium devices to reduce restenosis complications. His lab is also examining the effect of cell aging on endothelial permeability and mechanotransduction.

== Awards and appointments ==
- BMES Distinguished Service Award, 2012
- BMES president, 2008–2010
- Capers and Marion McDonald Award for Excellence in Mentoring, 2007
- BMES fellow, 2006
- Chair of Department of Biomedical Engineering at Duke University, 2003–2011
- AHA fellow, 1999
- AIMBE fellow, 1999
- Tau Beta Pi North Carolina Gamma Chapter Excellence in Teaching Award, 1998
