= Woodberry Poetry Room =

Special collections room of Harvard University's library system

The George Edward Woodberry Poetry Room is a special collections room of the library system at Harvard University in Cambridge, Massachusetts.

== Overview ==
Named for literary critic and poet George Edward Woodberry, the Woodberry Poetry Room was founded in 1931 with the help of a $50,000 donation from Harvard alumnus Harry Harkness Flagler. The collection focuses on 20th and 21st century English language poets and poetry. Among its notable holdings are recordings of authors and poets reading their own works.

The collection of audio recordings was initially collected by professor Frederick C. Packard, who created the Harvard Vocarium label with assistance from the Harvard Film Service. Packard, who was himself an early enthusiast of audio recordings, captured the voices of figures including performers William Gillette, Edwin Booth, and Florence Nightingale, as well as writers T. S. Eliot, E. E. Cummings, Tennessee Williams, and W. H. Auden.

It was first located in Widener Library before being moved to Lamont Library in 1949. Finnish artist Alvar Aalto designed the new room in a Scandinavian style.

Don Share served as curator from 2000 until 2007. The current curator is Christina Davis.
