= Liza Comita =

American ecologist

Liza Sheera Comita
- Born: 1977 (age 48–49); Philadelphia, Pennsylvania, U.S.
- Education: University of Georgia; University of Pennsylvania
- Scientific career
- Institutions: Smithsonian Tropical Research Institute; Ohio State University; National Center for Ecological Analysis and Synthesis; Yale University
- Thesis: Woody plant species abundance, distribution, and survival in the seedling bank of a neotropical forest : insights into the maintenance of diversity in tropical tree communities (2006)
- Website: Comita Lab

Liza Sheera Comita (born 1977) is an American ecologist and Professor of Tropical Forest Ecology in the School of the Environment at Yale University. Her research focuses on tropical tree species ecology and how spatial and temporal variation in early life-stages affects abundance and diversity of species in tropical forests.

== Early life and education ==
Comita was born in Philadelphia, Pennsylvania. She was an undergraduate student at the University of Pennsylvania, where she majored in biology. Comita started a Master's program in conservational biology. She moved to the University of Georgia for doctoral research in plant biology. Her research considered the abundance of woody plants and their survival in the seedling bank. The tropical forests studied by Comita contain some of the most diverse plant communities on earth. She combined community-wide surveying of seedlings on Barro Colorado Island with pre-existing tree data to better understand species abundance and distribution. In 2006, she joined the University of Minnesota as a postdoctoral researcher, where she worked for one year before moving to Columbia University. She moved to the National Center for Ecological Analysis and Synthesis in 2009.

== Research and career ==
In 2011, Comita joined Ohio State University as an Assistant Professor in the Department of Evolution, Ecology and Organismal Biology. She was appointed Assistant Professor of Tropical Forest Ecology at Yale University in 2014, and promoted to Professor in 2021. Her research considers plant community ecology and the mechanisms that drive patterns of diversity. She showed that rare plant species are sensitive to neighbors of their species, as opposed to the seedlings of common plants. As humans divide tropical forests into progressively smaller fragments, they increase the proportion of forest that suffer from so-called edge effects. Comita showed that these areas suffer from a number of environmental changes, including higher temperatures and lower humidity, which ultimately result in a loss of diversifying interactions.

Comita was appointed Director of the Yale University Center for Natural Carbon Capture in 2021.

=== Academic service ===
Comita worked as a postdoctoral mentor to the early career researchers who took part in the Women in Science at Yale program. In 2021, she was part of the group of women researchers who called out the culture of sexual harassment at the Smithsonian Tropical Research Institute.

== Awards and honors ==
- 2001: National Science Foundation Graduate Research Fellowship
- 2015: Elected Early Career Fellow of the Ecological Society of America
- 2016: Yale University Postdoctoral Mentoring Prize
- 2017: British Ecological Society Founders’ Prize

== Selected publications ==
- Marti J Anderson; Thomas O Crist; Jonathan M Chase; et al. (November 11, 2010). "Navigating the multiple meanings of β diversity: a roadmap for the practicing ecologist". Ecology Letters. 14 (1): 19–28. doi:10.1111/J.1461-0248.2010.01552.X. ISSN 1461-023X. PMID 21070562. Wikidata Q33744367.
- Bettina M J Engelbrecht; Liza S Comita; Richard Condit; Thomas A Kursar; Melvin T Tyree; Benjamin L Turner; Stephen P Hubbell (May 1, 2007). "Drought sensitivity shapes species distribution patterns in tropical forests". Nature. 447 (7140): 80–82. Bibcode:2007Natur.447...80E. doi:10.1038/NATURE05747. ISSN 1476-4687. PMID 17476266. Wikidata Q31111431.
- Nathan J.B. Kraft; Liza S. Comita; Jonathan M Chase; et al. (September 1, 2011). "Disentangling the drivers of β diversity along latitudinal and elevational gradients". Science. 333 (6050): 1755–1758. Bibcode:2011Sci...333.1755K. doi:10.1126/SCIENCE.1208584. ISSN 0036-8075. PMID 21940897. Wikidata Q34028313.
- Robert Muscarella; Maria Uriarte; Jimena Forero-Montan;, Liza S. Comita; Nathan G. Swenson; Jill Thompson; Christopher J. Nytch; Inge Jonckheere; Jess K. Zimmerman (2013). "Life-history trade-offs during the seed-to-seedling transition in a subtropical wet forest community". Journal of Ecology. 101: 171–182. doi: 10.1111/1365-2745.12027
