= Daniel Muzyka =

Canadian academic

Daniel F. Muzyka is a Canadian academic, who served as a professor and dean at the University of British Columbia. He is also the former president and CEO of the Conference Board of Canada.

Muzyka has extensive experience in academics, business, and public policy and has participated on a number of boards of companies, venture capital funds, as well as not-for-profit and government organizations and committees. He worked in industry with General Electric in finance and strategy and was a strategy consultant with Braxton Associates. In addition, he has been a board member and consultant to several other business and not-for-profit organizations, including Vice Chair and a public director of the Investment Industry Regulatory Organization of Canada (IIROC), the Vancouver Board of Trade (Past Chair), Graduate Management Admissions Council (GMAC), New Ventures B.C., and the European Venture Capital Association. Muzyka chaired NSERC's Expert Advisory Committee on Partnerships and Innovation.

Muzyka holds a Doctorate of Business Administration from Harvard University, an MBA with concentration in Strategic Planning from the University of Pennsylvania, and a BA with Honours in Physics and Astronomy from Williams College. He has been awarded the National Order of Merit (Chevalier de l'Ordre National du Mérite) by the Government of France.

In 2021, as Acting CEO of the Royal British Columbia Museum, Muzyka made the controversial decision to close the third floor galleries of the museum to the public with the stated aim of removing some of the permanent exhibits, offering 'decolonization' as the justification. The move has since been panned by many critics, as having been made without consulting the public and as an act of historical censorship, along with the hiding and erasure of history.
