= Don Share =

American poet

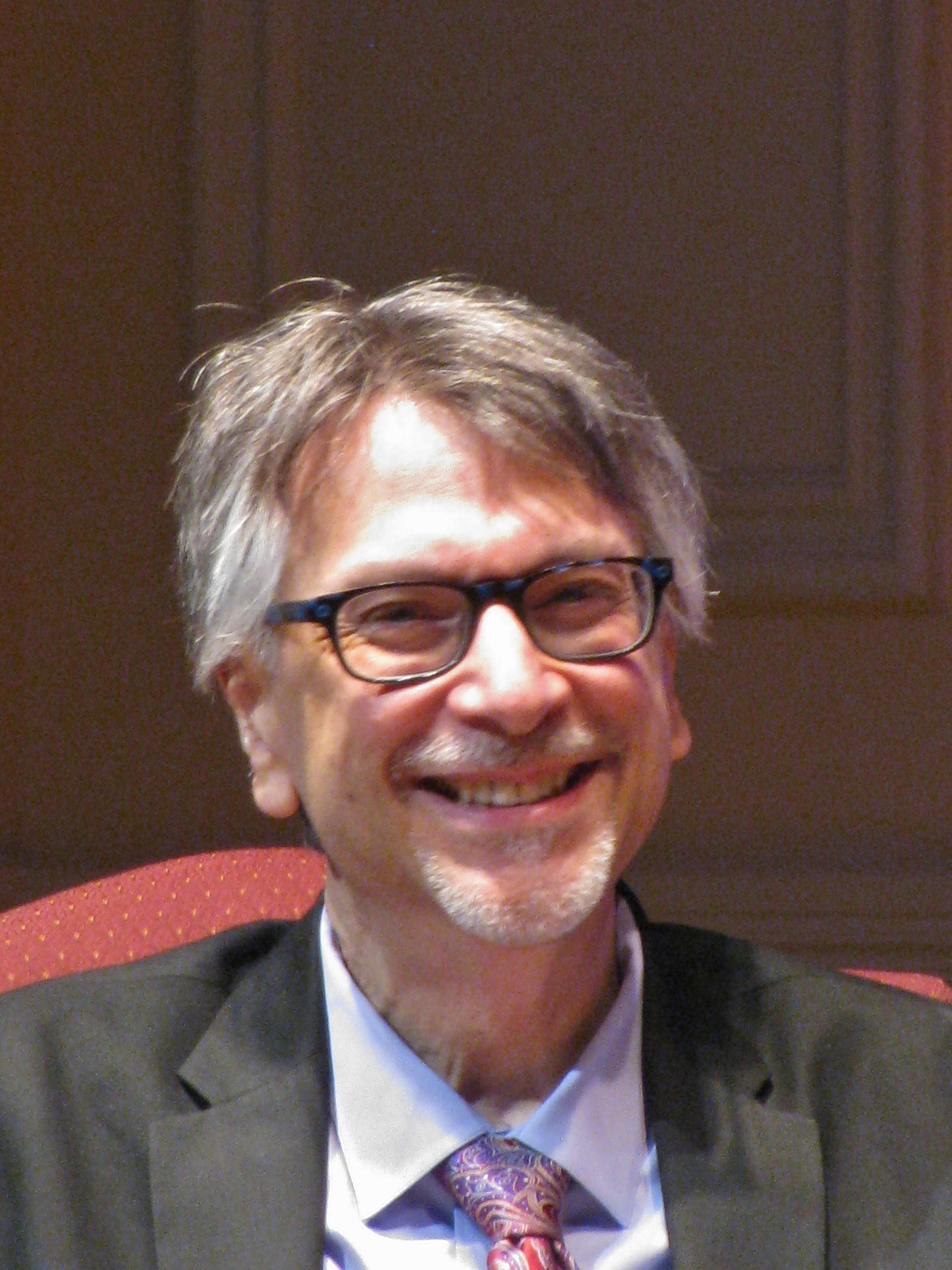
- Don Share in 2015
- Occupations: Poet, editor, translator

Don Share is an American poet, editor, and translator. He was the editor of Poetry magazine from 2013 to 2020. He grew up in Memphis, Tennessee.

== Career ==
Share was senior editor of Poetry magazine before being named its editor in 2013; he began the role on July 1 of that year. The Poetry Foundation announced on June 26, 2020, that he would step aside as editor at the end of that summer.

From 2000 to 2007, Share was curator of Harvard University's Woodberry Poetry Room. He was also poetry editor of Harvard Review. He held other editorial roles including editor-in-chief of Literary Imagination and poetry editor of Partisan Review until that magazine ceased publication in 2003.

Share's translations of Miguel Hernández, collected in I Have Lots of Heart, won the 1999 Premio Valle Inclán.

== Works ==
=== Poetry ===
- Union: Poems, Zoo Press, 2002, ISBN 9780970817778; Eyewear Publishing, 2013, ISBN 9781908998101
- Squandermania, Salt Publishing, 2007, ISBN 9781844712946
- Wishbone, Black Sparrow Press, 2012, ISBN 9781574232196

=== Edited volumes ===
- Don Share and Christian Wiman (eds.), The Open Door: One Hundred Poems, One Hundred Years of Poetry Magazine, University of Chicago Press, 2012, ISBN 9780226750705.
- Fred Sasaki and Don Share (eds.), Who Reads Poetry: 50 Views from “Poetry” Magazine, University of Chicago Press, 2017, ISBN 9780226504766.
- Don Share (ed.), The Poems of Basil Bunting, Faber and Faber, 2016
