= Charlie Brady Hauser =

American politician (1917–2007)

Dr. Charlie Brady Hauser

Charlie Brady Hauser (October 13, 1917 – November 11, 2007) was an American educator and legislator. He was a professor of education at Winston-Salem State University in North Carolina for 21 years, and served two terms in the North Carolina General Assembly. He had also taught education at West Virginia State College. Dr. Hauser described himself as the "second strike" against segregated travel in America for refusing to move to the back of a bus in 1947, the "first strike" being credited to Irene Morgan Kirkaldy, a black woman whose refusal to give up her bus seat to white passengers in 1944 led to a landmark United States Supreme Court decision more than 10 years before Rosa Parks.

Hauser was born on a farm in the small southern town of Yadkinville, North Carolina, the third of thirteen siblings. He believed that he learned leadership skills while growing up on the farm because, as third oldest child, he had to help take care of his many younger siblings, while at the same time doing his chores and getting whatever education he could in what he called "this 'no stop sign' small segregated southern town." He said, "All that personal history gave me a fortitude, which I drew on that day in 1947 on that Greyhound bus going to West Virginia." He later said that he did not sit on the back seat of the bus that October day because he knew the Supreme Court had ruled that interstate passengers were not subject to state Jim Crow laws. He felt that as an educated U.S. citizen who had served his country in time of war, having spent 44 months fighting overseas, he was determined to exercise his right as a citizen. He had served with the U.S. Army 582-641st Ordnance and Munitions Division. Promoted to Staff Sergeant, his exemplary service was recognized with a Good Conduct Medal, an Eastern Theater of Operations Ribbon, and Five Battle Stars. As a veteran, he took full advantage of the GI Bill, earning his master's degree and a doctorate in education from the University of Pennsylvania. He also attended Catholic University and Texas Southern University, becoming a member of the Omega Psi Phi fraternity. He enlisted in the Army with the ambition of becoming a commissioned officer or a warrant officer, but was ultimately denied a commission despite fulfilling all mental and physical exams. He attributed this to racial discrimination.

For his refusal to move to the back of a Greyhound bus while traveling from Winston-Salem to his teaching job at West Virginia State College, Hauser was arrested and jailed. He recalled that as talk of lynching and mob violence swirled around him, he remained composed and unafraid. At one point he even heard someone shout "Get the rope!" In recalling this years later he said, "Like in the war as the bombs exploded and the possibility of death filled the air, I just concentrated on what I needed to focus on to survive." He was, as President John F. Kennedy famously said of their generation, "Tempered by war."

Upon his release on bail, he set about planning his legal response. During the months that followed, prior to his day in court, he considered filing a lawsuit for false arrest. He also felt that his case might provide a test of the constitutionality of North Carolina segregation laws. The judge ruled that his arrest was unconstitutional, stating that he had the right to sit wherever he pleased. The judge further stated that, having sworn to uphold the United States Constitution, he was obliged to throw the case out of court. The Atlantic Greyhound Lines was ordered to pay a judgment of $2,000. With the money Dr. Hauser bought a car, elated that he "didn't have to take the bus again!"

In taking such his action, Dr. Hauser followed the path of Elizabeth Jennings Graham. A century before Rosa Parks' famous stand, and 90 years before that of Irene Morgan Kirkaldy, Graham was 24-year-old schoolteacher who was ejected from a horse drawn New York City streetcar because she was a woman of color. She took her case to court, and was victorious.

Although a lifetime member of the N.A.A.C.P., Dr. Hauser resisted requests to take a more active role in the civil rights movement, preferring to contribute to the effort in his own way. He retired from teaching in 1977, going on to serve two terms in the North Carolina General Assembly in the early 1980s. A decorated war veteran, he died on Veterans Day at age 90.

== Quote ==
In speaking of his role in the legal battle for equal treatment in public transportation, Dr. Hauser said:

"Everybody's heard the expression "three strikes you're out!" Well, that's what it came down to when Rosa Parks refused to give up her seat to a white passenger on that Alabama day in [1955]. The laws were in place. The masses were ready for a change. The leadership had been developed. And the time had finally come."

"...Irene Morgan was the first strike against the Jim Crow laws with her 1944 Virginia court challenge. There was no fanfare, just her fierce determination."
