= E. Coppée Mitchell =

American lawyer and educator (1836-1886)

- Born: Edward Coppée Mitchell; July 26, 1836; Savannah, Georgia, U.S.
- Died: January 25, 1887 (aged 50); Philadelphia, Pennsylvania, U.S.
- Resting place: Laurel Hill Cemetery, Philadelphia, Pennsylvania, U.S.
- Employer: University of Pennsylvania Law School
- Spouse: Eliza C. Stevens
- Children: 6

Edward Coppée Mitchell (July 26, 1836 – January 25, 1887) was an American lawyer and educator. He served as chair of Law of Real Estate, Conveyancing and Equity Jurisprudence and dean of the University of Pennsylvania Law School from 1873 to 1886 and as vice provost of the Law Academy in Philadelphia from 1877 to 1886.

== Early life and education ==
Mitchell was born in 1836 in Savannah, Georgia to John James and Elizabeth (Coppée) Mitchell. He entered Trinity College in 1851 but transferred to the University of Pennsylvania in his sophomore year and graduated in 1855. He was a member of the Zeta Psi fraternity. He worked in the law office of John C. Mitchell, and was admitted to the bar in October 1858. He received his doctorate of law degree from Hobart College in 1876.

== Career ==
Mitchell served as chair of Law of Real Estate, Conveyancing and Equity Jurisprudence and as dean of the University of Pennsylvania Law school from 1873 to 1886. He served as vice provost of the Law Academy in Philadelphia from 1877 to 1886.

He was an expert in real estate law and published several books on the subject including, The Law of Real Estate and Conveyancing in Pennsylvania (1890) with Robert Ralston, Separate Use in Pennsylvania, Contracts for the Sale of Land in Pennsylvania and The Equitable Relation of the Buyer and Seller of Land Under Contract and Before Conveyance.

He served as vice president of the University of Pennsylvania Athletic Association and on the Pennsylvania Board of Public Charities and the Fairmount Park Commission.

Mitchell suffered from bouts of pneumonia, and died of heart failure on January 25, 1887. He was interred in Laurel Hill Cemetery in Philadelphia.

== Personal life ==
He lived at 2015 Chestnut Street in Philadelphia, Pennsylvania. Mitchell was married to Eliza C. Stevens and together they had six children.

Mitchell was a senior member of the Masonic Order, and served as Grand Master of the Grand Lodge of Pennsylvania from 1885-1886.

== Publications ==
- Separate Use in Pennsylvania, Considered with Respect to the Restraint on Alienation, Philadelphia: T & J.W. Johnson & Company, 1875
- The Equitable Relations of Buyer and Seller of Land Under Contract and Before Conveyance, Philadelphia: Rees Welch & Co., 1877
- Principles of the Law of Real Estate. Intended as a First Book for the Use of Students in Conveyancing, Philadelphia: T & J.W. Johnson & Company, 1879
- The Law of Real Estate and Conveyancing in Pennsylvania, Philadelphia: Rees Welch & Co., 1890

| Preceded by E. Spencer Miller | Dean of the University of Pennsylvania Law School; 1873–1886 | Succeeded by Christopher Stuart Patterson |
