= Christopher Stuart Patterson =

American academic

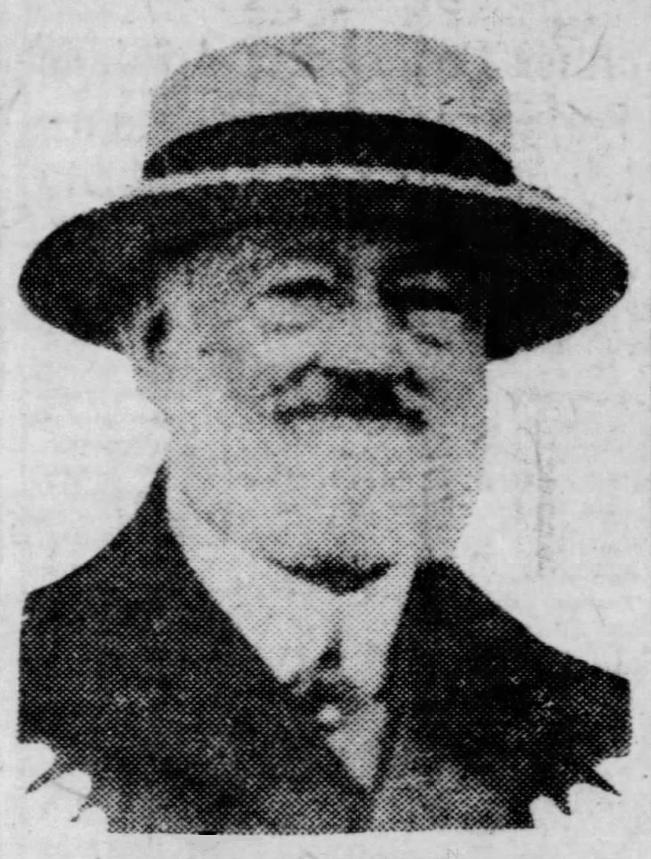
- Christopher Stuart Patterson as shown in 1924
- Born: June 24, 1842
- Died: November 8, 1924 (aged 82)
- Education: University of Pennsylvania
- Employer: University of Pennsylvania Law School
- Title: Dean

Christopher Stuart Patterson (June 24, 1842 – November 8, 1924) was an American lawyer who served as dean of the University of Pennsylvania Law School.

His parents were Joseph and Jane (Cuyler) Patterson. Patterson graduated from the University of Pennsylvania in 1860, and lived in Chestnut Hill, in Philadelphia.

During the American Civil War, in 1863 Patterson became a sergeant in Landis' First Battery of Philadelphia Light Artillery, and that year he was wounded at the Battle of Gettysburg. Following the war, Patterson became a member of the Pennsylvania Bar in 1865.

Patterson was a law professor at the University of Pennsylvania Law School from 1887 to 1898, teaching, real estate, conveyancing, and constitutional law, and was its Dean from 1890 to 1896.

He was the 13th President of the Union League of Philadelphia in 1897 and 1898.

Patterson died of cardiac arrest in his home in Philadelphia at the age of 82.

Preceded by E. Coppée Mitchell	Dean of the University of Pennsylvania Law School; 1888–1895	Succeeded by G.S. Harrison; Interim Sub-Dean
