= Florencia Marotta-Wurgler =

Florencia Marotta-Wurgler is Boxer Family Professor of Law at the New York University School of Law. Her specialties are contract law and commercial law.

== Biography ==
Marotta-Wurgler was born in Buenos Aires. She received a B.A. in Economics from the University of Pennsylvania in 1996, where she was departmental valedictorian, and a J.D. from the NYU School of Law in 2001, where she was Robert McKay Scholar and winner of the Daniel G. Collins Prize for Excellence in Contract Law.

Before her appointment at the NYU in 2006, she worked as an associate at Davis Polk & Wardwell, completed a fellowship at Fordham Law School’s Center for Corporate, Securities, and Financial Law, and completed a Wagner fellowship at the NYU Center for Law and Business.

She is a member of the New York State Bar Association, and a member of the Executive Committee of the Internet and Computer Law Section of the Association of American Law Schools. She has testified in the U.S. Senate on deceptive Internet sales tactics.

== Research ==
Marotta-Wurgler’s research has focused on standard form contracting (boilerplate) on the Internet. Most of her papers can be downloaded here on SSRN.

- "Some Realities of Online Contracting," Supreme Court Economic Review (special issue dedicated to the 3rd Annual Conference on The Law and Economics of Innovation) (forthcoming, 2010)
- "Are ‘Pay Now, Terms Later’ Contracts Worse for Buyers? Evidence from Software License Agreements," 38(2) Journal of Legal Studies 309 (2009)
- "Competition and the Quality of Standard Form Contracts: The Case of Software License Agreements," 5 Journal of Empirical Legal Studies 477 (2008)
- "What’s in a Standard Form Contract? An Empirical Analysis of Software License Agreements," 4 Journal of Empirical Legal Studies 677 (2007)
- "‘Unfair’ Dispute Resolution Clauses: Much Ado About Nothing?" in "Boilerplate": Foundations of Market Contracts", Omri Ben-Shahar, ed., Cambridge University Press, (2007)
- "Does Anyone Read the Fine Print? Testing a Law and Economics Approach to Standard Form Contracts," NYU School of Law working paper (with Yannis Bakos and David R. Trossen) (2009)
- "Does Disclosure Matter?" NYU School of Law working paper (2010)

== See also ==
- Electronic commerce
