= Joseph McCann (academic) =

American academic administrator

Joseph E. McCann III (1946–2015) was an American academic and academic administrator.

McCann earned an MA and PhD from Wharton School of the University of Pennsylvania, following an MBA and BA from the University of Washington.

McCann was dean of the John H. Sykes College of Business at the University of Tampa from 2000 and announced in December 2005 that he would stand down in June 2006. He was a professor at Tampa and director of the TECO Center for Leadership, Florida Directors Institute.

In May 2008, he was chosen as the new dean of Jacksonville University's business school, the Davis College of Business, as a replacement for former dean Jan Duggar.

McCann died at the age of 69 on October 4, 2015, at his home in Fernandina Beach, Florida. He had been diagnosed with pancreatic cancer.
