= Elika Bergelson =

American developmental psychologist

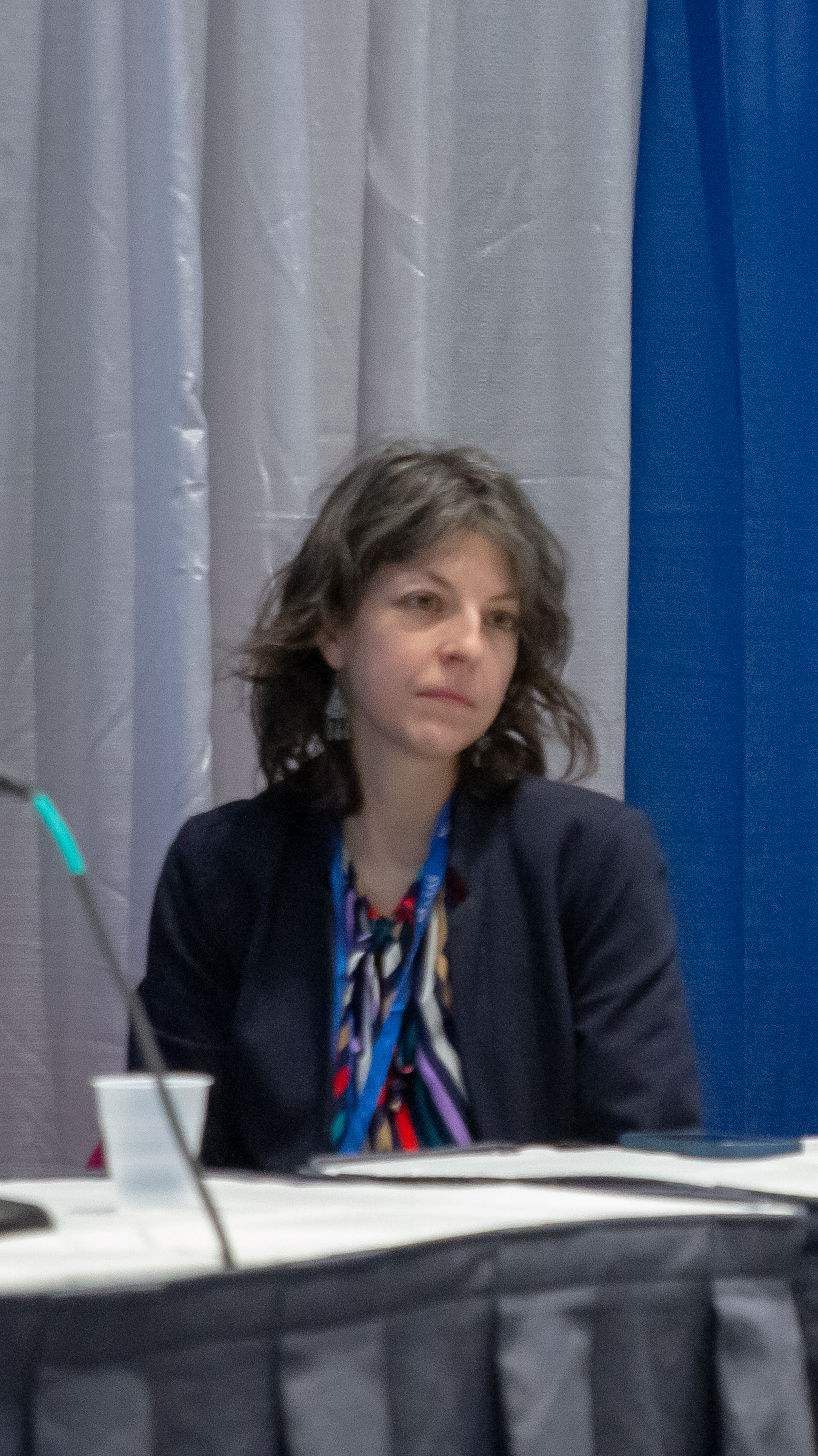
- Occupation: Professor of Developmental Psychology

Academic background
- Education: New York University; University of Pennsylvania

Academic work
- Institutions: Harvard University

Elika Bergelson is a language scientist known for her work on language acquisition and cognitive development. She was the principal investigator of the SEEDLingS project, a longitudinal study of word learning in infants from 6 to 18 months. Bergelson was selected for Forbes' 30 under 30 in 2015 for her work on language acquisition.

Bergelson is a professor of developmental psychology at Harvard University.

== Awards ==
2019 Steve Reznick Early Career Award from the Cognitive Development Society

2019 Developmental Science Early Research Career Prize for Best Article for the paper "Day by day, hour by hour: Naturalistic language input to infants"

2021 American Psychological Federation 2021 Robert L. Fantz Memorial Award for Young Psychologists

2022 Infancy Studies (ICIS) Distinguished Early Career Contribution Award

2023 Federation of Associations in Behavioral & Brain Science (FABBS) Early Career Impact Award

== Biography ==
Elika Bergelson was born to Russian immigrant parents and grew up in Columbus, Ohio. She was raised in household speaking three languages: English, Russian and Hebrew. She attended New York University where she completed a B.A. in language and mind, and in music. After graduating, she became a research fellow at the University of Maryland. She then completed a master's degree and Ph.D. in psychology at the University of Pennsylvania under the supervision of Dan Swingley. In her dissertation "Word learning in 6-16 month old infants," she documented 6-month old infants' ability to comprehend about a dozen words and a marked increase in vocabulary comprehension at ages 13–14 months. This increase in the number of words infants comprehend is called the "comprehension boost".

Bergelson conducted post-doctoral research at the University of Rochester Center for Language Sciences from 2013 to 2014. She subsequently became a research assistant professor at the University of Rochester, where she began the SEEDLingS project. This project involved in-home and in the lab data collection with the aim of capturing the relationship between infants' environments and their language acquisition.

In 2016, Bergelson joined the faculty of Duke University as the Crandall Family Assistant Professor of Psychology and Neuroscience. She received an "Early Investigator Award" from the National Institutes of Health to support her research program combining daylong recordings of language input collected in infants' homes with lab experiments. In 2023, she left Duke to join Harvard University's Department of Psychology as an associate professor. Bergelson was previously the president of DARCLE, an organization that supports the use of naturalistic recordings in child and family speech and language acquisition. Her work has been supported by grants from the National Science Foundation, the Food and Drug Administration, and the National Institutes of Health.

Bergelson married Dr. Zachary Kern, whom she met in 2011 at a Trader Joe's.

== Research ==
Bergelson studies the impact of the environment on language acquisition during infancy. Her work has led to new ways of thinking about infants' ability to learn words and the impact of factors relating to the linguistic environment infants are exposed to during their formative years. Her studies include babies between 6 and 18 months old––ages that mark the beginning of word comprehension and the beginning of word production. Her approach includes using daylong recordings to validate what adult speakers in infant-caregiver dyads claim to be the words produced by their infants.

In research conducted with Daniel Swingley, Bergelson challenged the idea that children begin to "link words to their referents" at 12 months and claimed that it actually begins at 6 months of age. In a study conducted with Richard Aslin, she found that 6-month-old infants looked equally at two objects upon hearing their label if they had related meanings (e.g., juice and milk). On the other hand, the infants looked longer at the target object when the two objects were unrelated. They concluded that this provided evidence of word recognition in infants as young as 6 months. Bergelson also found that there was a comprehension boost at 13–14 months. Her research suggests that the comprehension boost cannot be explained by changes in environmental input; instead, infants improve their ability to take advantage of the input they receive.

In other work, Bergelson examined variables related to the home environment and language acquisition. She and her colleagues found that the more language young children heard, the more speech they produced. In contrast, other variables including socioeconomic status, gender and multilingualism did not significantly influence rate of speech production. Her study was unique in that it combined at-home recordings and experimental techniques. In another study, Bergelson and her colleagues analyzed 10,861 utterances drawn from 61 homes using 24-hour daylong recordings. They coded utterances for the gender of the speaker, whether the speech was adult-directed or child-directed, and maternal education. The authors found that children heard 2-3 times more speech from female speakers than from male speakers, and children whose mothers had higher educational attainment heard more child-directed speech.

Bergelson's paper titled "Day by day, hour by hour: Naturalistic language input to infants" won the Early Research Prize from the journal Developmental Science in 2019. This study compared daylong audio-recordings to hourlong video-recordings, and found that they provided different information and led to different conclusions about the language input young children receive. Video-recordings provided a sample that was dense with nouns and questions, some of which did not occur in daily interactions, while the audio-recordings captured nouns that were consistently used across families.

In 2023, Bergelson received the FABBS "Early Career Impact" award, recognizing her efforts to further understanding of infant language acquisition and development and her work with public outreach Her research has influenced child-rearing practices, both by parents and public entities.

== Representative publications ==
- Bergelson, E. (2020). Why do older infants understand words better? Leveraging lab studies and home recordings to build and test theories of early word comprehension. Child Development Perspectives. 14(3), 142–149.
- Bergelson E., Amatuni, A., Dailey, S., Koorathota, S., Tor, S. (2019). Day by day, hour by hour: Naturalistic language input to infants. Developmental Science, 22(1), e12715.
- Bergelson, E., & Aslin, R. N. (2017). Nature and origins of the lexicon in 6-mo-olds. Proceedings of the National Academy of Sciences, 114(49), 12916–12921.
- Bergelson, E., & Aslin, R. (2017). Semantic specificity in one-year-olds' word comprehension. Language Learning and Development, 13(4), 481–501.
- Bergelson, E., & Swingley, D. (2012). At 6–9 months, human infants know the meanings of many common nouns. Proceedings of the National Academy of Sciences, 109(9), 3253–3258.
- Bergelson, E., & Swingley, D. (2018). Young infants' word comprehension given an unfamiliar talker or altered pronunciations. Child Development. 89(5), 1567–1576.
