= Michael Chernew =

Health economics expert

Michael E. Chernew is an American expert in the field of health economics. He is a member of the Medicare Payment Advisory Commission, the National Academy of Sciences and the Institute of Medicine.

Chernew graduated from the University of Pennsylvania with a bachelor's degree and his PhD in economics is from Stanford University, where he focused on applied microeconomics and econometrics.
