= Benefactor (law) =

Person who gives some form of help to benefit a person, group or organization

A benefactor (from Latin bene 'good' and factor 'maker') is a person who gives some form of help to benefit a person, group or organization (the beneficiary), often gifting a monetary contribution in the form of an endowment to help a cause. Benefactors are humanitarian leaders and charitable patrons providing assistance in many forms, such as an alumnus from a university giving back to a college or an individual providing assistance to others.

== See also ==
- Patronage
- Sponsor (commercial)
