= Pratt School of Engineering =

Duke University engineering school, US

Coordinates: 36.0040°N 78.9403°W

Duke University Pratt School of Engineering
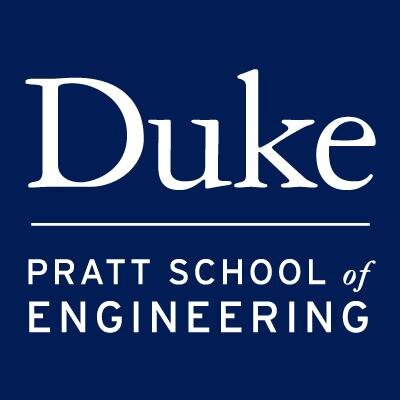
- Other name: Edmund T. Pratt School of Engineering
- Former name: College of Engineering (1939–1999)
- Type: Private
- Established: 1939
- Parent institution: Duke University
- Dean: Jerome P. Lynch, PhD, F.EMI
- Faculty: 156
- Undergraduates: 1,257
- Postgraduates: 1,281
- Location: Durham, North Carolina, United States
- Website: pratt.duke.edu

The Duke University Pratt School of Engineering is the engineering school of Duke University, a private research university in Durham, North Carolina, United States.

The school was created by the Board of Trustees at Duke University as the College of Engineering in 1939. It was named in 1999 following a $35 million gift by Edmund T. Pratt Jr., a 1947 bachelor's degree recipient and former chief executive of Pfizer.

The school maintains departments in the fields of biomedical engineering, civil & environmental engineering, electrical & computer engineering, and mechanical engineering & materials science.

== History ==
The precursor to the school of engineering dates back to 1851, when Duke was known as Normal College and located in Randolph County, North Carolina. At that time, engineering was included in a classical course for seniors. A course in engineering was introduced in 1887, eventually becoming a regular course offering in 1903. At that time, engineering courses were limited to such fields as architecture and surveying until 1924, when Trinity College was renamed Duke University. Engineering was taught in the new separate departments of civil and electrical engineering. In 1931, a mechanical engineering department was created. Duke's Board of Trustees created the College of Engineering in 1939, with William H. Hall its first dean.

The College of Engineering graduated its first female graduates in 1946. The next year, the three departments moved from East Campus to West Campus. It became the Duke School of Engineering in 1966. Two years later the school's first black students graduated. The Division of Biomedical Engineering was created in 1967—the first accredited biomedical engineering department at a U.S. university—in September 1972. In 1997, the Master of Engineering Management was established. The school was renamed the Edmund T. Pratt Jr. School of Engineering in 1999, in honor of Edmund T. Pratt Jr., a 1947 graduate and former CEO of Pfizer.

=== List of deans ===
- William H. Hall, 1939–1953
- Walter J. Seeley, 1953–1962
- James L. Meriam, 1962–1969
- George Pearsall, 1969–1974, 1982–1983
- Aleksandar Vesic, 1974–1982
- Earl H. Dowell, 1983–1999
- Kristina M. Johnson, 1999–2007
- Robert L. Clark, 2007–2008
- Thomas C. Katsouleas, 2008–2015
- George Truskey, 2015–2016
- Ravi V. Bellamkonda, 2016–2021
- Jeffrey T. Glass, 2021

== Notable alumni ==
- M. Katherine Banks – Phytoremediation of petroleum contamination
- Robert E. Fischell – Leadership and innovation in bringing aerospace technology to implantable medical devices
- William A. Hawkins III – Leadership in biomedical engineering and translational medicine
- Blake S. Wilson – Engineering development of the cochlear implant
- Kathryn R. Nightingale – Invention of Ultrasound Acoustic Radiation Force Imaging
