= Pezavia O'Connell =

American Methodist minister (1861–1930)

Pezavia O'Connell (1861–1930) was a Methodist minister, scholar of Hebrew, educator, and African-American activist. He was the first African American to earn a Ph.D. in Semitic languages, which he was awarded at University of Pennsylvania in 1898.

== Early life and education ==
Pezavia O'Connell was born in Natchez, Mississippi in 1861, two months after Mississippi's secession from the Union. His parents were Richard O'Connell, identified in a 1880 census as a farmer, and Angeline O'Connell. After the war and emancipation, he pursued education. For a time he attended Jackson Baptist College and Wilberforce University in Ohio. He earned a degree in divinity in 1888 from Gammon Theological Seminary in Atlanta, Georgia. It is an historically black college affiliated then with the Methodist Episcopal Church, North (now the United Methodist Church).

He married Maria Jane Johnson in about 1888, and they remained married 42 years until his death. They had an adopted daughter, Helen Gertrude Roberts.

O'Connell continued his studies, undertaking doctoral studies at the University of Pennsylvania in Philadelphia. The program was then called "Semitics". It is now the Department of Near Eastern Languages and Civilizations (NELC). He earned his PhD degree from Penn in 1898, for a dissertation entitled, "Synonyms of the Clean and Unclean in Hebrew."

== Career ==
After earning his PhD, Pezavia O'Connell was hired as principal of Princess Anne Academy in Salisbury, Maryland, where he served from 1899 to 1902. It was founded as a historically black public land-grant institution of higher education. (In the 20th century it was further developed as University of Maryland Eastern Shore, (UMES), now a large research university.) O'Connell was called to be a pastor in the Methodist Episcopal Church, where he served from 1902 until 1911.

He moved to Washington, DC, where he served as a professor at Howard University Divinity School from 1911 to 1913. From 1913 to 1916 he lived again in Atlanta, where he served as a professor at his undergraduate alma mater, Gammon Theological Seminary. In 1920 he became a professor of History and Philosophy at Morgan College (now Morgan State University), an historically black college (HBCU) in Baltimore, Maryland. He served until his death in 1930.

The frequency of his career moves may have been related to the perceived radicalism of his views. In his 1921 book The History of the Negro Church, historian Carter G. Woodson cited O'Connell's "decidedly outspoken" beliefs about the need for Black self-defense, which some Black leaders considered too militant. "Dr. Pezavia O'Connell, a gentleman of scholarship and character, has all but suffered professional martyrdom because he has always fearlessly championed the cause of the Negro," Woodson wrote. "Inasmuch as such an advanced position does not always harmonize with the faith of his communicants, he has been proscribed in certain circles."

== Death and legacy ==
Pezavia O'Connell died on November 26, 1930, at age 69. In "Notes" published in the Journal of Negro History in 1931, O'Connell was remembered as an eloquent and outspoken figure, who emphasized the importance of "searching after the truth." He was described as fearless in "exposing the insincerity of socalled {sic} 'white friends' of the Negro...", who repeatedly compromised on questions of their rights.

O'Connell Hall, a residence hall at Morgan State University built in 1964, was named for him.
