= List of Penn Law School alumni =

This is a list of notable people affiliated with the University of Pennsylvania Law School by virtue of attending or graduating from Penn Law. For a list of notable people who matriculated at, graduated from, taught at or governed the University of Pennsylvania as a whole, see List of University of Pennsylvania people.

== Law and government ==
=== U.S. government ===
==== President ====
The three presidents who were awarded honorary doctorate of law degrees by Penn (in chronological order of being granted the honorary doctorate degrees) are:

- George Washington, honorary Doctor of Law, Class of 1783, 1st president of the United States
- Franklin Delano Roosevelt, honorary Doctor of Law, Class of 1940, 32nd president of the United States
- Dwight David Eisenhower, honorary Doctor of Law, Class of 1947, 34th president of the United States

==== Executive branch ====
- Philip Werner Amram, asst. attorney general of the United States, 1939–42
- William H. Brown, III, chairman, EEOC
- Gilbert F. Casellas, chairman, EEOC and general counsel of the Air Force
- Walter Joseph "Jay" Clayton III, Penn Law Class of 1993, chair of the U.S. Securities and Exchange Commission 2017–2020
- Josiah E. DuBois Jr., U.S. State Department official, instrumental in Holocaust rescue
- Thomas K. Finletter, Penn Law Class of 1920, United States secretary of the Air Force 1950–1953; United States ambassador to NATO 1961–65
- Lindley M. Garrison, Penn Law Class of 1885, LLB, secretary of war under President Woodrow Wilson (1913–1916)
- William B. Gray, United States attorney for Vermont, 1977–1981
- Earl G. Harrison, commissioner of the U.S. Immigration and Naturalization Service, 1942–44
- Henry Hoyt, Penn Law class of 1881, US solicitor general, 1903–1909
- Shira Perlmutter, Penn Law Class of 1983, 14th Register of Copyrights; previously chief policy officer and director for international affairs at the United States Patent and Trademark Office; first associate register for Policy and International Affairs at the U.S. Copyright Office
- Melissa Rogers, Penn Law class of 1991, director of the White House Office of Faith-Based and Community Initiatives under President Joe Biden
- Heath Tarbert, nominee for assistant secretary of the Treasury for International Markets and Development in the U.S. (2017)
- Katherine "Kathi" Vidal (née Kelly), Penn Law Class of 1996, under secretary of Commerce for Intellectual Property and director of the United States Patent and Trademark Office (USPTO)
- Robert J. Walker, U.S. secretary of the treasury, 1840–45
- George W. Wickersham, attorney general of the United States, 1909–1913; instrumental in the breakup of Standard Oil; president of the Council on Foreign Relations (1933–36)
- George Washington Woodruff, Class of 1895, acting U.S. secretary of the interior under President Theodore Roosevelt

=== Federal Supreme Court ===
- Owen J. Roberts, justice, Supreme Court of the United States
- James Wilson, justice, Supreme Court of the United States (Hon. LL.D); Penn's first law professor (1790–92); signer of the Declaration of Independence, and major participant in first and subsequent drafts of U.S. Constitution, which he signed (becoming one of only six people to sign both documents)

=== Federal circuit courts ===
- Arlin Adams, Penn Law class of 1947, judge, U.S. Court of Appeals for the Third Circuit, 1969–1987
- John Warren Davis, Penn Law class of 1906, former judge for both the U.S. District Court for the District of New Jersey and the United States Court of Appeals for the Third Circuit
- James Hunter III, Penn Law class of 1939, judge, U.S. Court of Appeals for the Third Circuit, 1971–1989
- Harry Ellis Kalodner, Penn Law class of 1917, chief judge, U.S. Court of Appeals for the Third Circuit, 1946–1977
- Phyllis A. Kravitch (1920–2017), Penn Law class of 1943, judge, U.S. Court of Appeals for the Eleventh Circuit
- John Bayard McPherson, Penn Law professor, judge, U.S. Court of Appeals for the Third Circuit, 1912–1919
- Max Rosenn, Penn Law class of 1932, judge, U.S. Court of Appeals for the Third Circuit, 1970–2006
- Patty Shwartz, Penn Law class of 1986, judge, United States Court of Appeals for the Third Circuit, assumed office 2013
- Dolores Sloviter, Penn Law class of 1956, judge, U.S. Court of Appeals for the Third Circuit
- Joseph Whitaker Thompson, judge, U.S. Court of Appeals for the Third Circuit, 1931–1946
- Helene White, Penn Law class of 1978, judge, U.S. Court of Appeals for the Sixth Circuit (regular: 2008–2022; senior: 2022– )

=== Federal district courts ===
- Guy K. Bard, judge, U.S. Dist. Court, E.D. Pa.
- Harvey Bartle III, judge, U.S. Dist. Court, E.D. Pa.
- Michael Baylson, judge, U.S. Dist. Court, E.D. Pa.
- Ralph C. Body, judge, U.S. Dist. Court, E.D. Pa., 1965–73
- Raymond J. Broderick, judge, U.S. Dist. Court, E.D. Pa.
- Margo Kitsy Brodie, judge, U.S. Dist. Court, E.D. NY
- Allison D. Burroughs, judge, District of Massachusetts
- A. Richard Caputo, judge, U.S. Dist. Court, M.D. Pa.
- Tanya S. Chutkan, class of 1987, judge, U.S. Dist. Court, D.C.
- Rudolph Contreras, judge, U.S. Dist. Court, D.C.
- James Harry Covington, judge, U.S. Dist. Court, D.C.; co-founder of Covington & Burling
- Stewart Dalzell (1943–2019), graduated from the University of Pennsylvania, Wharton School of Business with a Bachelor of Science degree in 1965; received Juris Doctor from the University of Pennsylvania Law School in 1969; United States district judge of the United States District Court for the Eastern District of Pennsylvania
- John Morgan Davis, judge, U.S. Dist. Court, E.D. Pa., 1964–84
- John Warren Davis, Penn Law Class of 1906, former judge for both the U.S. District Court for the District of New Jersey and the United States Court of Appeals for the Third Circuit
- Paul S. Diamond, judge, U.S. Dist. Court, E.D. Pa.
- John William Ditter Jr., judge, U.S. Dist. Court, E.D. Pa.
- Herbert Allan Fogel, judge, U.S. Dist. Court, E.D. Pa., 1973–78
- Jennifer L. Hall, Penn Law Class of 2004, United States district judge of the United States District Court for the District of Delaware since 2024; previously United States magistrate judge of the same court 2019–2024
- James Halpern, judge, U.S. Tax Court, 1990–2005
- Daniel Henry Huyett III, judge, U.S. Dist. Court, E.D. Pa., 1970–98
- Abdul Kallon, judge, U.S. Dist. Court, N.D. Al.
- William Huntington Kirkpatrick, judge, U.S. Dist. Court, E.D. Pa, 1927–58
- John C. Knox, judge, U.S. Dist. Court, S.D.N.Y., 1948–55
- Charles William Kraft Jr., judge, U.S. Dist. Court, E.D. Pa., 1956–2002
- Robert Lowe Kunzig, judge, U.S. Court of Claims, 1971–82
- Caleb Rodney Layton III, judge, U.S. Dist. Court, D.E., 1957–88
- Paul Conway Leahy, judge, U.S. Dist. Court, D.E., 1942–66
- James Russell Leech, judge, U.S. Tax Court, 1932–52
- Joseph Simon Lord III, judge, U.S. Dist. Court, E.D. Pa., 1961–92
- Alfred Leopold Luongo, judge, U.S. Dist. Court, E.D. Pa., 1961–86
- Thomas Ambrose Masterson, judge, U.S. Dist. Court, E.D. Pa, 1967–73
- James Focht McClure Jr., judge, U.S. Dist. Court, M.D. Pa.
- Barron Patterson McCune, judge, U.S. Dist. Court, W.D. Pa.
- Joseph Leo McGlynn Jr., judge, U.S. Dist. Court, E.D. Pa., 1974–99
- Gerald Austin McHugh Jr., judge, U.S. Dist. Court, E.D. Pa., 2014–
- Charles Louis McKeehan, judge, U.S. Dist. Court, E.D. Pa., 1923–25
- Roderick R. McKelvie, judge, U.S. Dist. Court, D.E., 1991–2002
- Mary A. McLaughlin, judge, U.S. Dist. Court, E.D. Pa.
- John W. Murphy, judge, U.S. Dist. Court, M.D. Pa., 1946–62
- Thomas Newman O'Neill Jr., judge, U.S. Dist. Court, E.D. Pa.
- Peter Delome Overfield (1874–1959), Penn Law class of 1900, judge for district court for the Territory of Alaska (serving Fairbanks, Valdez and Anchorage) appointed in 1909 by President William Howard Taft, All-American college football player and professional football player for 1901 Homestead Library & Athletic Club football team
- Gene E. K. Pratter, judge, U.S. Dist. Court, E.D. Pa.
- Arthur Raymond Randolph, judge, U.S. Court of Appeals for the District of Columbia Circuit
- Sue Lewis Robinson, judge, U.S. Dist. Court, D.E.
- Juan Ramon Sánchez, judge, U.S. Dist. Court, E.D. Pa.
- Ralph Francis Scalera, judge, U.S. Dist. Court, W.D. Pa.
- Allen G. Schwartz, judge, U.S. Dist. Court, S.D.N.Y., 1993–2003
- Murray Merle Schwartz, chief judge, U.S. Dist. Court, D.E, 1974–
- Norma Levy Shapiro, judge, U.S. Dist. Court, E.D. Pa.
- Jerome B. Simandle, judge, U.S. Dist. Court N.J.
- Charles Swayne, judge, U.S. Dist. Court, N.D. Florida, 1890–1907
- Donald West VanArtsdalen, judge, U.S. Dist. Court, E.D. Pa., 1970–85
- Jay Waldman, judge, U.S. Dist. Court, E.D. Pa., 1988–2003
- Gerald Joseph Weber, judge, U.S. Dist. Court, W.D. Pa.
- Harold Kenneth Wood, judge, U.S. Dist. Court, E.D. Pa, 1959–71

==== Other federal courts ====
- Bruce E. Reinhart, Penn Law Class of 1987, magistrate judge, Southern District of Florida
- Jonathan R. Steinberg (1940–2015), Penn Law Class of 1963, appointed by President George H.W. Bush in 1990 to be federal judge for the United States Court of Appeals for Veterans Claims, retired in 2005 but stayed on as a senior judge

=== Legislative branch (US) ===
==== US Senate ====
- Joseph Maull Carey, U.S. senator from Wyoming 1890–1895; governor of Wyoming 1911–1915; Wyoming delegate to the U.S. Congress 1885–1890, and justice on Wyoming Supreme Court
- Joseph Sill Clark, U.S. senator from Pennsylvania 1957–69
- James Henderson Duff, U.S. senator from Pennsylvania, 1951–57
- George Wharton Pepper, U.S. senator from Pennsylvania, chronicler of the Senate

==== US House of Representatives ====
- Ephraim Leister Acker, LL.B., Penn Law Class of 1886 and M.D., Penn Med Class of 1852, elected as a Democrat to Pennsylvania representative to the Forty-second Congress (1871–1873)
- Wilbur L. Adams, Delaware representative to the U.S. Congress, 1933–35
- George F. Brumm, Pennsylvania representative to the U.S. Congress, 1929–34
- Matt Cartwright (born 1961), Penn Law Class of 1986, United States representative from Pennsylvania's 8th congressional district
- Bernard G. Caulfield, Illinois representative to the U.S. Congress, 1874–77
- E. Wallace Chadwick, Pennsylvania representative to the U.S. Congress, 1947–49
- Joel Cook, Pennsylvania representative to the U.S. Congress, 1907–11
- James Harry Covington, Maryland representative to the U.S. Congress, 1909–14
- Willard S. Curtin, Class of 1932, Pennsylvania representative to the U.S. Congress, 1957–1967, having been elected as a Republican to the Eighty-fifth and to the four succeeding Congresses (and his election triumphs included defeating noted author James A. Michener in the 1962 election) and respected for voting in favor of the Civil Rights Acts of 1957, 1960, and 1964, as well as the 24th Amendment to the U.S. Constitution and the Voting Rights Act of 1965
- John Burrwood Daly, Pennsylvania representative to the U.S. Congress, 1939–35
- Clare G. Fenerty, Pennsylvania representative to the U.S. Congress, 1935–37
- Oliver Walter Frey, Pennsylvania representative to the U.S. Congress, 1933–39
- Benjamin Golder, Pennsylvania representative to the U.S. Congress, 1925–33
- George Scott Graham, Pennsylvania representative to the U.S. Congress, 1913–31
- Francis Hopkinson, New Jersey delegate to the Continental Congress; signer of the Declaration of Independence (1737–1791)
- Everett Kent, Pennsylvania representative to the U.S. Congress, 1923–25, 1927–29
- William Huntington Kirkpatrick, Pennsylvania representative to the U.S. Congress, 1921–23
- Conor Lamb (born 1984), Penn Law Class of 2009, member of Democratic Party, U.S. representative from Pennsylvania's 17th congressional district; first elected to Congress in March 2018 from the neighboring 18th district in a special election that attracted national attention
- James Russell Leech, Pennsylvania representative to the U.S. Congress, 1927–32
- William Eckart Lehman, Pennsylvania representative to the U.S. Congress, 1860–62
- John Thomas Lenahan, Pennsylvania representative to the U.S. Congress, 1907–09
- Lloyd Lowndes Jr., Maryland representative to the U.S. Congress, 1873–75
- James McDevitt Magee, Pennsylvania representative to the U.S. Congress, 1923–27
- Levi Maish, Pennsylvania representative to the U.S. Congress, 1875–79 and 1887–91
- Joseph M. McDade, Pennsylvania representative to the U.S. Congress, 1963–99
- Thomas C. McGrath Jr., New Jersey representative to the U.S. Congress
- Edward de Veaux Morrell, Pennsylvania representative to the U.S. Congress, 1900–07
- John Murphy, Pennsylvania representative to the U.S. Congress, 1943–46
- Leonard Myers, Pennsylvania representative to the U.S. Congress, 1863–75
- Robert N.C. Nix Sr., Pennsylvania representative to the U.S. Congress, 1958–79
- Cyrus Maffet Palmer, Pennsylvania representative to the U.S. Congress, 1927–29
- Albert G. Rutherford, Pennsylvania representative to the U.S. Congress, 1937–41
- Leon Sacks, Pennsylvania representative to the U.S. Congress, 1937–41
- Mary Gay Scanlon (born 1959), Penn Law Class of 1984, Democratic Party member of the United States House of Representatives, representing Pennsylvania's 5th congressional district
- Hardie Scott, Pennsylvania representative to the U.S. Congress, 1947–53
- John Roger Kirkpatrick Scott, Pennsylvania representative to the U.S. Congress, 1915–19
- William Biddle Shepard, North Carolina representative to the U.S. Congress, 1829–37
- Edward J. Stack, Florida representative to the U.S. Congress, 1979–81
- William I. Troutman, Pennsylvania representative to the U.S. Congress, 1943–45
- William H. Wilson, Pennsylvania representative to the U.S. Congress, 1935–37
- Charles A. Wolverton, New Jersey representative to the U.S. Congress, 1927–59

==== Diplomatic ====
Penn Law alumni have served as United States ambassadors to 11 different nations, and as foreign ambassadors to seven different nations (as detailed below):

- Alfredo Toro Hardy (b. 1950), Penn Law LLM Class of 1979, former ambassador of Venezuela to the United States, the United Kingdom, Spain, Brazil, Chile, Ireland and Singapore
- George Charles Bruno, U.S. ambassador to Belize (1994–1997)
- David L. Cohen, Class of 1981, nominated on July 21, 2021, to be U.S. ambassador to Canada
- Thomas K. Finletter, Penn Law Class of 1920, United States ambassador to NATO 1961–65
- Lloyd Carpenter Griscom (1872–1959), Penn Law Class of 1891, LLB, and Penn Law Class of 1907, Doctor of Laws, US ambassador to Persia, Japan, Brazil, and Italy
- Charles A. Heimbold, Jr. (born 1933), Penn Law Class of 1960, LLB converted to JD in 1975, U.S. ambassador to Sweden (2001–2004)
- Charles Hill (1936–2021), Penn Law Class of 1960, JD, Penn Graduate School Class of 1961, MA; Yale University diplomat-in-residence and lecturer and United States State Department Foreign Service diplomat
- Stuart E. Jones, Penn Law Class of 1986, U.S. ambassador to Iraq 2014–2016, and Jordan 2011–2014
- Martin J. Silverstein, Penn Law LLM Class of 2008, U.S. ambassador to Uruguay
- Faith Ryan Whittlesey, Penn Law Class of 1963, U.S. ambassador to Switzerland

=== State government ===
==== Executive ====
- John C. Bell Jr. (1892–1974), Class of 1917, 18th lieutenant governor of Pennsylvania (1943–1947) before becoming the 33rd and shortest-serving governor of Pennsylvania, serving for nineteen days in 1947, 1937–37
- John Cromwell Bell Sr., Class of 1884; father of Penn Law alumni, former Pennsylvania governor and chief justice of Pennsylvania Supreme Court John C. Bell, Jr. and former NFL commissioner DeBenneville Bert Bell and son-in-law of Penn Law alumnus and former United States House of Representatives member Leonard Myers; district attorney of Philadelphia (1903–1907) and 49th attorney general of Pennsylvania (1911–1915); also director of Penn's athletic program, chairman of its football committee, and from 1911 onwards, was a trustee and helped found the NCAA
- Raymond J. Broderick (1914–2000), Penn Law Class of 1935, lt. governor of Pennsylvania
- Francis Shunk Brown (1858–1940), Penn Law Class of 1879 50th Pennsylvania attorney general 1915–1919
- Joseph M. Carey, Class of 1864, governor of Wyoming, 1911–1915
- Hampton L. Carson (1852–1929), Penn College Class of 1971, Penn Law Class of 1874, professor at Penn Law School 1895–1901, attorney general of Pennsylvania 1903–1907, president of the American Bar Association 1919–1921
- John Morgan Davis, lt. governor of Pennsylvania, 1959–63
- Paula Dow, attorney general of New Jersey, 2010–2012
- John Hanger, secretary of the Pennsylvania Department of Environmental Protection, 2008–2011; commissioner of the Pennsylvania Public Utility Commission, 1993–1998
- James Henderson Duff, governor of Pennsylvania, 1947–51
- William F. Hyland, attorney general of New Jersey, 1974–1978
- Lloyd Lowndes, governor of Maryland, 1896–1900
- John G. McCullough, attorney general of California during the American Civil War; governor of Vermont, 1902–1904
- Charles R. Miller, governor of Delaware, 1913–17
- Samuel W. Pennypacker, governor of Pennsylvania, 1903–07
- David Samson, attorney general of New Jersey, 2002–03
- William A. Schnader, attorney general of Pennsylvania (1930–34); a drafter of the Uniform Commercial Code

==== Judicial - state supreme courts ====
- Alexander F. Barbieri (1907–1993), Penn College Class of 1929, Penn Law Class of 1932, justice of the Pennsylvania Supreme Court and judge of Commonwealth Court of Pennsylvania, one of the original members of the Commonwealth Court in 1970 who was then appointed to the Pennsylvania Supreme Court in 1971 (but was defeated for election in 1971 and returned to the Commonwealth Court as a senior judge (1983–1993)
- John C. Bell Jr. (1892–1974), Class of 1917, justice of the Pennsylvania Supreme Court (1950–1972), chief justice 1961–1972
- Joseph M. Carey, justice on Wyoming Supreme Court (also mayor of Cheyenne, Wyoming, U.S. attorney for the Territory of Wyoming, governor of Wyoming, U.S. representative for Wyoming, U.S. senator for Wyoming)
- James Harry Covington, chief justice of the District of Columbia Supreme Court (and co-founder of Covington & Burling)
- Arthur J. England, Jr. BS in economics, 1955 from Wharton School of the University of Pennsylvania and JD, magna cum laude, 1961 from University of Pennsylvania School of Law, served on the Florida Supreme Court (1975–1981), chief justice of the Florida Supreme Court (1978–1980)
- Richard L. Gabriel (born 1962), Class of 1987, appointed in 2015 as associate justice of the Colorado Supreme Court; previously served on the Colorado Court of Appeals 2008–2015
- Randy J. Holland, justice of the Delaware Supreme Court, 1986–present (left bench in 2017)
- Edwin Ames Jaggard (1859–1911), Penn Law class of 1882, judge on Minnesota District Court (Ramsey County, Minnesota) (1898–1905), and justice on Minnesota Supreme Court (1905–1911)
- Benjamin Rowland Jones, Jr. (1906–1980), Penn Law class of 1930, justice of the Supreme Court of Pennsylvania 1957–1972 and chief justice 1972–1977
- Daniel J. Layton, chief justice of the Delaware Supreme Court, 1933–45 and attorney general of Delaware, 1932–33
- James T. Mitchell (1834–1915), Penn Law Class of 1860, associate justice (1889–1903) and chief justice (1903–1910) of the Supreme Court of Pennsylvania
- Robert N. C. Nix Jr., chief justice of the Pennsylvania Supreme Court, 1984–96; first African-American chief justice of any state's highest court; justice of the Pa. Supreme Court, 1971–84
- Joseph B. Perskie (1885–1957), class of 1907, associate justice of the New Jersey Supreme Court 1933–1947
- Deborah T. Poritz, chief justice of the New Jersey Supreme Court, 1996–2006
- Horace Stern, chief justice of the Pennsylvania Supreme Court, 1952–56
- Leo E. Strine Jr., class of 1988, chief justice, Delaware Supreme Court (left bench in 2019)
- Karen L. Valihura, Penn Law Class of 1986, justice of the Delaware Supreme Court (appointed June 6, 2014)

==== Judicial - other state judges ====
- Thomas J. Baldrige, Pennsylvania attorney general, judge and president judge of Superior Court of Pennsylvania
- Harold L. Ervin, Pennsylvania Superior Court judge 1954–1967
- Gerald Garson, NY Supreme Court justice, convicted of bribery
- Joseph L. Kun, judge, Court of Common Pleas of Philadelphia
- Peter B. Krauser, chief judge on the Court of Special Appeals for the state of Maryland and past chair of the Maryland Democratic Party
- Louis E. Levinthal, judge of the Pennsylvania Court of Common Pleas (Philadelphia County)
- Albert Dutton MacDade, Pennsylvania state senator 1921–1929, judge, Pennsylvania Court of Common Pleas (Delaware County) 1942–1948

==== Legislative - state ====
- Joseph F.M. Baldi (1893–1970), Wharton class of 1916, B.S. in economics; Penn Law class of 2019 (did not graduate; elected and served as a Republican in the Pennsylvania House of Representatives (1929–1933)
- Harry W. Bass, Penn Law Class of 1896, first African-American member of the Pennsylvania House of Representatives, 1911–1914
- John C. Grady, Penn Law Class of 1870, Pennsylvania senator for the 7th district 1877–1903, president pro tempore of the Pennsylvania Senate 1887–1890
- Bernard M. Gross (1935–2024), Penn Law Class of 1959, Wharton Undergrad Class of 1956, Pennsylvania House of Representatives 200th District (1969–1970)
- Bruce Marks, Penn Law Class of 1984, Pennsylvania senator for 2nd senatorial district 1994–1995

==== Other ====
- David Norcross, past chairman of the New Jersey Republican State Committee

=== City government ===
- John Cromwell Bell, Sr., Class of 1884, district attorney of Philadelphia (1903–1907)
- Joseph M. Carey, 14th mayor of Cheyenne, Wyoming (also U.S. attorney for the Territory of Wyoming, governor of Wyoming, U.S. representative for Wyoming, U.S. senator for Wyoming, and justice on Wyoming Supreme Court)
- Joseph S. Clark, mayor of Philadelphia, 1952–56
- Mark Farrell, Class of 2001, mayor of San Francisco in 2018
- Shirley Franklin, mayor of Atlanta, 2002–10
- Oscar Goodman, mayor of Las Vegas, 1999–2011
- Judith Flanagan Kennedy, Class of 1987, 56th mayor of Lynn, Massachusetts (2010–2018), launched a write-in campaign for mayor after the death of candidate Patrick J. McManus and defeated incumbent Edward J. Clancy, Jr. on November 3, 2009; Lynn's first female mayor
- Henry W. Sawyer, Philadelphia City Council, 1956–1960
- Ken Trujillo, Penn Law Class of 1986, Philadelphia city solicitor, assistant U.S. attorney, won a historic settlement against gun manufacturers

=== Non-United States government ===
==== Politics ====
- Donald Duke, former commissioner for Finance of Cross River State, Nigeria; former presidential candidate; governor of Cross River State, Nigeria (1999–2007)
- John Wallace de Beque Farris, Penn Law Class of 1900, member of the senate of Canada (1937–1970); attorney general of Vancouver (1917–1920)
- Raul Roco, former presidential candidate; secretary of education in the Philippines (fellow)

==== Judicial (supreme court) ====
- Gerard Hogan, Penn Law LLM class of 1982, justice on the Supreme Court of Ireland 2021–, previously advocate general of the European Court of Justice 2018–2021 and the Court of Appeal of Ireland 2014–2018; obtained a John F. Kennedy memorial scholarship to study for an LLM, which he earned in 1982 from the University of Pennsylvania Law School
- Yvonne Mokgoro, Penn Law LLM class of 1990, former justice of the Constitutional Court of South Africa, the supreme constitutional court of South Africa
- Sir Ronald Wilson, Penn Law LLM class of 1957, 28th justice of the High Court of Australia, the highest court in the nation (1979–1989)

==== Diplomatic ====
- Andrea Canepari, ambassador of Italy to the Dominican Republic, where in 2017, he reopened the Embassy of Italy and inaugurated a new diplomatic chancery; and left in 2021; consul general of Italy in Philadelphia 2013–2017
- Alfredo Toro Hardy, Penn Law LLM Class of 1979, former ambassador of Venezuela to the United States, the United Kingdom, Spain, Brazil, Chile, Ireland and Singapore and former director of Venezuela's Diplomatic Academy

== Academia ==
=== University presidents ===
- Janice R. Bellace, first president of Singapore Management University
- Fred Hilmer, vice-chancellor of the University of New South Wales
- Peter J. Liacouras, chancellor of Temple University
- Mark Yudof, president of the University of California System

=== Legal academics ===
- Khaled Abou El Fadl, professor of law at UCLA School of Law; scholar of Islamic law, immigration, human rights, international and national security law
- Azizah Y. al-Hibri, professor of Law at the University of Richmond; founding editor of Hypatia: a Journal of Feminist Philosophy; founder and president of KARAMAH: Muslim Women Lawyers for Human Rights
- Anthony G. Amsterdam, professor of law at NYU Law School
- Loftus Becker, professor of law the University of Connecticut School of Law
- Janice R. Bellace, director of the Huntsman Program in International Studies and Business at the Wharton School of Business
- Francis Bohlen (1868–1942), Algernon Sydney Biddle professor of law at the University of Pennsylvania Law School
- Goler Teal Butcher, University of Pennsylvania Law School LLM Class of 1958, professor at Howard University Law School and attorney-adviser in the United States Department of State's office of the legal adviser (1963–1971) as the first black person in the role to serve in the legal unit of the State Department legal affairs office
- Robert Butkin, dean of the University of Tulsa College of Law; state treasurer of Oklahoma
- Douglas Frenkel, Morris Shuster Practice Professor of Law at the University of Pennsylvania Law School
- Marci Hamilton, Paul R. Verkuil Chair of Public Law at the Benjamin N. Cardozo School of Law; constitutional law scholar
- Noyes Leech (1921–2010), law professor at the University of Pennsylvania Law School
- A. Leo Levin (1919–2015), law professor at the University of Pennsylvania Law School
- Curtis Reitz (born c. 1930), Algernon Sydney Biddle Professor of Law at the University of Pennsylvania Law School
- Louis B. Schwartz (1913–2003), law professor at the University of Pennsylvania Law School
- James Wilson (1742–1798), first professor of Law at University of Pennsylvania 1789–1798, the only person who signed the Declaration of Independence and United States Constitution, and served as a Supreme Court justice, during the Constitutional Convention, successfully proposed a unitary executive elected through an electoral college system and negotiated the Three-Fifths Compromise, delivered a series of lectures on law to President George Washington, Vice President John Adams, Secretary of State Thomas Jefferson, Secretary of the Treasury Alexander Hamilton, and numerous members of Congress with Wilson's first lecture on law being given to aforementioned government leaders on December 15, 1789
- Bernard Wolfman (1924–2011), dean of the University of Pennsylvania Law School and its Gemmill Professor of Tax Law and Tax Policy, Fessenden Professor of Law Emeritus at Harvard Law School

=== Other academics ===
- Charles Hill (1936–2021), Penn Law Class of 1960, JD, Penn Graduate School Class of 1961, MA; Yale University diplomat-in-residence and lecturer, United States State Department Foreign Service diplomat
- Scott Nearing (1883–1983), Penn Law Class of 1904 (dropped out), Wharton Class of 1905 (BS) and Class of 1909 (Ph.D.); 20th-century conservationist, peace activist, educator, writer and economist

== Activists ==
- Sadie Tanner Mossell Alexander, first African-American woman to receive a Ph.D. in economics in the United States; first African-American woman to graduate from Penn Law; first African-American woman to be admitted to the Pennsylvania Bar; civil rights activist; appointed to the Civil Rights Commission by President Harry S. Truman
- Stuart F. Feldman, co-founder of Vietnam Veterans of America
- Caroline Burnham Kilgore (LL.B.), first woman to graduate from Penn with a law degree; first woman to practice law in Pennsylvania; argued for a woman's right to vote before the Pennsylvania Supreme Court

== Arts and entertainment ==
- Benjamin Glazer, Penn Law Class of 1905, Academy Award-winning screenwriter and producer; 1927 won the first Academy Award for Best Adapted Screenplay for 7th Heaven
- John Russell Hayes, Class of 1892, Quaker poet and librarian
- Moe Jaffe, songwriter and bandleader
- Pam Jenoff, novelist
- Kimberly McCreight, author and lawyer
- El McMeen, guitarist
- Henry Chapman Mercer, archaeologist
- Tom Rapp, songwriter, Pearls Before Swine
- Lisa Scottoline, author of legal thrillers; New York Times best-selling author
- Michael A. Smerconish (born 1962), Class of 1987, broadcasts The Michael Smerconish Program on SiriusXM POTUS Channel, hosts a CNN and CNN International program, Smerconish, writes a column for The Philadelphia Inquirer, and authored seven books
- Jan Buckner Walker, cruciverbalist (crossword puzzle creator), author and games creator
- Natalie Wexler, novelist and legal scholar

== Business ==
- Randall Boe, Class of 1987, CGC of AOL
- Safra A. Catz, Class of 1986, CFO, Oracle Corporation; on Forbes' list of Most Powerful Women
- Sam Hamadeh, co-founder of Vault.com
- Charles A. Heimbold, Jr., former chairman and CEO, Bristol-Myers Squibb
- Murray Kushner, Class of 1976, real estate developer
- Gerald Levin, former CEO of AOL Time Warner
- Albert Theodore Powers, chairman and chief executive officer of the Allied Pacific Group

== Media and journalism ==
- Renee Chenault-Fattah, co-anchor of NBC 10 News in Philadelphia
- Adrian Cronauer, former radio disc jockey; special assistant to the director of the POW/MIA Office at the Department of Defense; inspiration for the film Good Morning, Vietnam
- Mark Haines, host of CNBC's Squawk Box
- Alberto Ibarguen, president and CEO of the John S. and James L. Knight Foundation; former publisher of The Miami Herald and El Nuevo Herald
- Norman Pearlstine, chief content officer of Bloomberg L.P.; former editor-in-chief of Time
- Michael A. Smerconish (born 1962), Class of 1987, broadcasts The Michael Smerconish Program on SiriusXM, hosts a CNN and CNN International program, Smerconish, writes a column for The Philadelphia Inquirer, and authored seven books
- Van Toffler, Class of 1983, former president, MTV Networks
- Lynn Toler, judge of the television series Divorce Court

== Sports ==
- Irving Baxter (1876–1957), Penn Law Class of 1901, won the gold medal in both the men's high jump and the pole vault at the 1900 Summer Olympics, in Paris, France, and silver medals in all three of the standing jumps (long, triple, and high) at the 1900 Paris Olympics
- Meredith Colket (1878–1947), College Class of 1901 and Penn Law Class of 1904, winner of a silver medal in the pole vault at the 1900 Summer Olympics in Paris; won the silver medal in the men's pole vault just behind his fellow Penn Law alumnus, Irving Baxter, who won the gold medal
- Anita DeFrantz (born 1952), Penn Law Class of 1977, 1976 women's eight-oared shell bronze medalist; first woman and first African-American to represent the United States on the International Olympic Committee; IOC's first female vice president; chair of the Commission on Women and Sports
- Billy Goeckel (1871–1922), Penn Law Class of 1895, played for Penn's varsity baseball team 1893–1895 where he was "considered the finest collegiate first baseman of his day" and played portion of one season (in 1899) for the Philadelphia Phillies; organizer and attorney for the Wilkes-Barre South Side Bank and Trust Company; chairman of Wilkes-Barre's Democratic City Committee; wrote "The Red and Blue," which has since become the Penn theme song; leader of University of Pennsylvania Glee Club
- Augustus Goetz (1904–1976), Penn College Class of 1925 and Penn Law Class of 1929, competed in the men's coxed pair event at the 1928 Summer Olympics
- Marvin Goldklang (born 1942), Wharton School of Finance Class of 1964 and Penn Law Class of 1967, owns a minority interest in the Major League Baseball team, New York Yankees, and majority interests in minor league baseball teams including Charleston, South Carolina, Oklahoma City, Oklahoma, and St. Paul, Minnesota
- Thomas Truxtun Hare (1878–1956), undergraduate class of 1901 and Penn Law Class of 1903; at 1900 Summer Olympic Games won bronze, silver, and gold medals; charter member of the College Football Hall of Fame

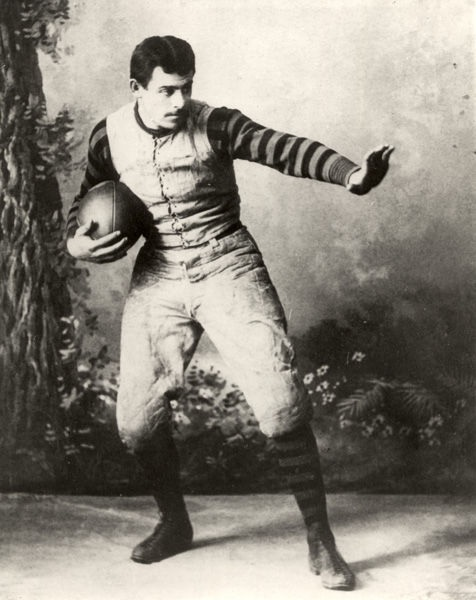
John Heisman, University of Pennsylvania Law School class of 1892 alumnus and rugby football player, posing at Penn in 1891 holding elongated ellipsoidal rugby ball and gestures resembling the famed "Heisman Pose"

- John Heisman (1869–1936), Class of 1892, football and rugby football player and coach of football, basketball, and baseball, namesake of the Heisman Trophy who was instrumental in the first decade of the 20th century in changing the rules of rugby football to more closely relate to present rules of American football
- Sarah Elizabeth Hughes (born 1985), Class of 2018, former competitive figure skater, 2002 Winter Olympics gold medalist, 2001 world bronze medalist in ladies' singles
- Harry Arista Mackey (1869–1938), Penn Law Class of 1893, captain of Penn football team, mayor of Philadelphia 1928–1932
- David Micahnik (born 1938), Penn College Class of 1960 and Penn Law Class of 1964, fenced for the University of Pennsylvania where he was a first-team All-Ivy selection in épée as a senior and the 1960 U.S. National Champion and competed in the individual and team épée events at the 1960, 1964 and 1968 Summer Olympics
- Peter Delome Overfield (1874–1959), Penn Law Class of 1900, All-American at Penn and professional football player for Homestead L. & A. C., which defeated Blondy Wallace's Philadelphia professionals 18 to 0 for the professional football championship of the United States (played at the Philadelphia park); in 1909, was appointed by President William Howard Taft to be a federal judge in United States District Court for the District of Alaska (serving Fairbanks, Valdez and Anchorage)
- Andrew Towne, Class of 2015, won the Intercollegiate Rowing Association national championship regatta as the four-seat on the Yale varsity lightweight crew, member of the team that completed the first human-powered transit of the Drake Passage
- Woody Wagenhorst (1863–1946), Penn Law Class of 1892, played Major League Baseball as a third baseman for the Philadelphia Quakers in 1888 (in two career games, he had one hit in eight at-bats), head football coach at the Penn 1888–1891, compiling a record of 39–18, while a student at Penn Law
- George Washington Woodruff (1864–1934), Penn Law Class of 1895, coach of Penn Crew (1892–1896) and Penn Football (1896–1901); as football coach (who originated "guards back," "delayed pass," and "flying interference" tactics) he compiled 124-15-2 record, including three undefeated seasons in 1894, 1895 and 1897 earning him election to the College Football Hall of Fame and his teams being recognized as national champions in 1894, 1895, and 1897; also chief law officer in the National Forest Service, acting United States secretary of the interior under President Theodore Roosevelt, Pennsylvania attorney general, federal judge for Territory of Hawaii

== Other ==
- Daniel Barringer, first person to prove the existence of a meteorite crater on earth, namesake of the Barringer Meteor Crater in Arizona
- James Harry Covington, co-founder of Covington & Burling; chief justice of the Supreme Court of the District of Columbia
- John G. Johnson, lawyer (noted by many to be one of the greatest attorneys in U.S. history) who argued 168 cases before the Supreme Court; twice turned down an appointment to the U.S. Supreme Court
- William Draper Lewis, founder and first director of the American Law Institute
- Edward J. Normand, counsel, Lloyd's of London
- George Wharton Pepper, founder of Pepper Hamilton LLP, a firm with more than 500 lawyers
- Bernard Segal, past president of the American Bar Association
- Gigi Sohn, Class of 1986, founder of Public Knowledge, also worked for the Ford Foundation
- John Thomas Taylor, congressional lobbyist for the American Legion
- George W. Wickersham, co-founder of Cadwalader, Wickersham & Taft; attorney general of the United States; president of the Council on Foreign Relations

== Fictional alumni ==
- Andrew Beckett, gay, HIV-positive lawyer portrayed by Tom Hanks in the 1993 movie Philadelphia; his former boss says he hired him upon his graduation from the law school
- Anthony "Tony" Judson Lawrence, portrayed by Paul Newman, a graduate of University of Pennsylvania Law School, in the 1959 film The Young Philadelphians, based on 1956 novel The Philadelphian by Richard P. Powell
- Tom Raikes, a lawyer portrayed by Thomas Cocquerel in The Gilded Age TV series on HBO Max (who took property courses in 1880 with New York City "old money" scion, Gerry Schermerhorn, at Penn Law)

== Attended but did not graduate ==
- Thomas Clinton, executive at Deutsche Bank; key figure in the formation of the US Presbyterian Church
- William Radford Coyle, Pennsylvania representative to the U.S. Congress, 1925–27, 1929–33
- George B. McClellan, U.S. Civil War general; governor of New Jersey
- George Washington, attended lectures by James Wilson, who taught law class in 1789 to President Washington (who had previously received honorary Doctorate of Law, Class of 1783) and all the members of his cabinet, which at that time included:
  - Thomas Jefferson as first secretary of state
  - Alexander Hamilton as first secretary of the treasury
  - Henry Knox as first secretary of war
  - Edmund Randolph as first United States attorney general
