= Bruton (surname) =

Bruton is a surname. Notable people with the surname include:

- Bruton sisters
  - Esther Bruton (1896–1992), American printmaker, mosaic muralist, and painter
  - Helen Bell Bruton (1898–1985), American printmaker, mosaic muralist, and painter
  - Margaret Bruton (1894–1983), American printmaker, mosaic muralist, and painter
- Bill Bruton, center fielder for the Milwaukee Braves
- Cal Bruton, head coach of the West Sydney Razorbacks
- C. J. Bruton, basketball player with the New Zealand Breakers
- Donna Bruton (1954–2012), American painter, educator
- Jack Bruton, English footballer, born as John Bruton
- Jenna Bruton, North Melbourne Football Club AFLW player
- Jo Bruton (born 1967), British artist
- John Bruton (1947–2024), Irish Taoiseach, Ambassador of the European Union to the United States of America
- Kris Bruton, American basketball player
- Lauren Bruton (born 1992), English association footballer
- Niall Bruton, middle-distance runner
- Ogden Bruton, paediatrician and immunologist
- Paul Bruton, American law professor
- Quintilla Geer Bruton, American philanthropist and library advocate
- Richard Bruton, former Deputy Leader of Fine Gael and Opposition Spokesperson on Finance in Ireland
