= Robin Fleming =

American historian of medieval Britain

- Education: University of California, Santa Barbara (BA, PhD)
- Awards: MacArthur Fellow (2013)
- Scientific career
- Fields: Medieval history
- Workplaces: Boston College
- Doctoral advisor: C. Warren Hollister
- Other academic advisors: Denis Bethell, Harold Drake

Robin Fleming is an American medievalist and a professor of history at Boston College. She was the president of the Medieval Academy of America for 2023-2024 and a 2013 MacArthur Fellow. She has written several books focusing on the people of Roman Britain and early medieval Britain, using both archaeological evidence and written records.

== Early life and education ==
Fleming received her B.A. and Ph.D. from the University of California, Santa Barbara, in 1977 and 1984.

== Career and honors ==
Robin Fleming has been a professor of history at Boston College since 1989.

She has been the Matina S. Horner Distinguished Visiting Professor at the Radcliffe Institute for Advanced Study at Harvard (2009–2010), a Member of the School of Historical Studies at the Institute for Advanced Study, Princeton (2002–2003), a Fellow of the Guggenheim Foundation (2002), a Fellow of the Bunting Institute at Harvard (1993–94), and a Junior Fellow at the Harvard Society of Fellows (1986–89). Fleming was president of the Charles Homer Haskins Society from 2001 to 2006, and its conference director from 2009 to 2014.

In 2022, Fleming gave the Ford Lectures at Oxford on "Dogsbodies and Dogs' Bodies: A Social and Cultural History of Roman Britain’s Dogs and People".

Fleming was president of the Medieval Academy of America from 2023 to 2024.

Fleming is a fellow of the Massachusetts Historical Society, the Royal Historical Society, the London Society of Antiquaries, and the Medieval Academy of America.

== Bibliography ==
=== Books ===
- Fleming, Robin (2026). Thinking with Dogs in Roman Britain: Lived Experience, Inequality, and Ritual in a Roman Province. Oxford University Press. ISBN 0198938942.
- Fleming, Robin (2021). The Material Fall of Roman Britain, 300-525 CE. University of Pennsylvania Press. ISBN 9780812252446.
- Fleming, Robin (2011). Britain After Rome: The Fall and Rise, 400-1070. Penguin. ISBN 9780140148237.
- Fleming, Robin (2004). Kings and Lords in Conquest England. Cambridge University Press. ISBN 9780521526944.
- Fleming, Robin (1998). Domesday Book and the Law: Society and Legal Custom in Early Medieval England. Cambridge University Press. ISBN 052163038X.

=== Selected papers ===
- Fleming, Robin (April 1985). "Monastic Lands and England's Defence in the Viking Age". The English Historical Review. 100 (395): 247–265.
- Fleming, Robin (1993). "Rural Elites and Urban Communities in Late-Saxon England". Past & Present. 141: 3–37.
- Fleming, Robin (1995). "Picturesque History and the Medieval in Nineteenth-Century America". The American Historical Review. 100 (4): 1061–1094.
- Fleming, Robin (2006). "Bones for Historians: Putting the Body back in Biography". In Bates, David (ed.). Writing Medieval Biography: Essays in Honour of Frank Barlow. Woodbridge. pp. 29–48.
- Fleming, Robin (2007). "Acquiring, Displaying, and Destroying Silk in Late Anglo-Saxon England". Early Medieval Europe. 15 (2): 127–158.
- Fleming, Robin (2009). "Elites, Boats and Foreigners: Rethinking the Rebirth of English Towns". Città e campagna nei secoli altomedievali. Fondazione Centro Italiano di Studi sull’Alto Medioevo (Spoleto). Atti delle Settimane di Studio. Vol. 56. pp. 393–425.
- Fleming, Robin (2009). "Writing Biography on the Edge of History". The American Historical Review. 114 (3): 606–614.
- Fleming, Robin (2012). "Recycling in Britain after the Fall of Rome's Metal Economy". Past & Present. 217 (1): 3–45.
- Fleming, Robin; Leggett, Sam; Smith, Emma (2025). "Rethinking Grand Narratives: Mobility, Diet, and Health in a Small Corner of Early Medieval Hampshire". Speculum. 100 (3): 619–652.
- Fleming, Robin (2025). "Periodisation, Terminal Narratives, and the Beginning of the Middle Ages in Lowland Britain". Journal of Medieval History. 51 (4): 545–550.
- Fleming, Robin; Crosby, Vicky; Bayliss, Alex; Mays, Simon; Cool, Hilary; Wardle, Angela; Ramsey, Christopher Bronk; Dunbar, Elaine (2025). "Establishing a Chronology for Roman and Post-Roman Stanwick, Northamptonshire". Britannia. 56: 311–355.
