= Judge Giles =

Judge Giles may refer to:

- James T. Giles (born 1943), judge of the United States District Court for the Eastern District of Pennsylvania
- Patricia Tolliver Giles (born 1973), judge of the United States District Court for the Eastern District of Virginia
- William Fell Giles (1807–1879), judge of the United States District Court for the District of Maryland
