= William Edward Lunt =

American medievalist (1882–1956)

William Edward (W. E.) Lunt (January 13, 1882 – November 10, 1956) was an American medieval historian who specialized in the legal and economic history of England and the papacy. He spent most of his career as a professor of history at Haverford College in Pennsylvania.

== Education and academic career ==
Born in Lisbon, Maine, Lunt received his undergraduate degree from Bowdoin College in 1904, and his PhD from Harvard University in 1908 under the supervision of Charles Homer Haskins. Between 1908 and 1917, he taught briefly at the University of Wisconsin, at his alma mater, and then Cornell University before accepting an appointment at Haverford as the Scull Professor of English Constitutional History, where he remained for the rest of his career. Following World War I, he accompanied Woodrow Wilson and his Harvard mentor Haskins to the Paris Peace Conference, where he was the chief adviser to the American delegation on Italian affairs.

Lunt was elected a fellow of the Medieval Academy of America in 1927 and served as the organization's president from 1951 to 1954.

He received honorary doctorates from Bowdoin in 1929, and from Haverford in 1952, the same year he retired from teaching.

Lunt Hall, a student residence at Haverford, is named in his honor, as is the student-run Lunt Cafe.

Among the students Lunt taught at Haverford who went on to become noted medievalists themselves were Edgar B. Graves (AB '19, AM '21), John F. Benton ('53) and Thomas N. Bisson ('53).

== Scholarship ==
Lunt's primary scholarly interests focused on the fiscal administration of the papacy during the Middle Ages and its legal and economic relationship with the English church in particular. He conducted extensive research in both English and Vatican archives. His first major publication, The Valuation of Norwich (Oxford, 1926), examined papal taxation in England in the thirteenth century. This was followed by a popular textbook of English history in 1928, which saw several revised editions issued through the 1950s. Papal Revenues in the Middle Ages (2 vols., New York, 1934) is a still-essential collection of translated sources, mostly archival, on papal fiscal administration for students and researchers that gives a sense of the Roman church's role in the development of commerce and banking over the course of the Middle Ages.

In 1939, he produced The Financial Relations of the Papacy with England to 1327, published by the Medieval Academy of America, documenting the extensive system of religious revenues Rome raised from English foundations. It won the academy's own distinguished Haskins Medal in 1941. At the time of his death, Lunt had completed the manuscript of a companion volume covering the period up to 1534, but it remained unpublished due to financial constraints. It was finally published posthumously by the academy in 1962, under the editorship of his former student, Edgar Graves.

== Personal life ==
In 1910, Lunt married Elizabeth Elliot Atkinson. The couple had two children. One, Robert Henry (b. 1920), died following an accident in Florida in 1946, while the other, William Edward, Jr. (1913–1998), became an architect in the Philadelphia area.

== Selected works ==
- "The First Levy of Papal Annates." The American Historical Review 18, no. 1 (1912): 48–64.
- "Papal Taxation in England in the Reign of Edward I." The English Historical Review 30, no. 119 (1915): 398–417
- "The Text of the Ordinance of 1184 Concerning an Aid for the Holy Land." The English Historical Review 37, no. 146 (1922): 235–42.
- The Valuation of Norwich (Oxford: Clarendon Press, 1927)
- History of England (New York: Harper & Brothers, 1928), rev. eds. 1938, 1945, 1957.
- Papal Revenues in the Middle Ages, 2 vols. Columbia Records of Civilization (New York: Columbia University Press, 1934)
- The Financial Records of the Papacy with England, 2 vols., ed. E.B. Graves (vol. 2) (Boston: Medieval Academy of America, 1939-62)
- Accounts rendered by papal collectors in England, 1317-1378, ed. E.B. Graves (Philadelphia: American Philosophical Society, 1968)
