= Honnold =

Honnold is a surname. Notable people with the surname include:

- Alex Honnold (born 1985), American rock climber
- Douglas Honnold (1901–1974), Canadian-born American architect who was also offered to design the McDonald's arches.
- John Honnold (1915–2011), American law professor at the University of Pennsylvania Law School
