= Feldman v. Google, Inc. =

2007 United States civil action

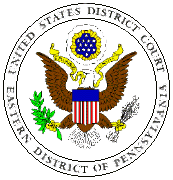
- Court: United States District Court for the Eastern District of Pennsylvania
- Decided: March 29, 2007
- Citation: 513 F.Supp.2d 229

Holding
- An online clickwrap license is an enforceable contact if both sides have been given reasonable opportunity to review and agree to the terms.

Court membership
- Judge sitting: James T. Giles

Keywords
- United States contract law, Forum selection clause

Feldman v. Google, Inc., 513 F.Supp.2d 229 (E.D. Pa. 2007), was a ruling at the United States District Court for the Eastern District of Pennsylvania. The case has become a defining precedent on the enforceability of clickwrap agreements for Internet services.

== Background ==
Lawrence E. Feldman, a lawyer, bought advertising services from Google via that company's AdWords program. Each time an Internet user searched for a word that had been purchased by Feldman, they would receive his ad and Feldman would be charged whenever someone clicked on his ad. When setting up the service, Feldman agreed to Google's clickwrap license, and acknowledged that the first few paragraphs of the agreement had been visible on his computer screen, while the rest could be seen by scrolling down.

After using the AdWords service for a time, Feldman claimed that he was the victim of click fraud when pranksters clicked on his ads repeatedly, causing him to incur charges when they were not potential customers of his law practice. Feldman believed that this caused his advertising efforts to become unexpectedly expensive.

Feldman filed suit at the United States District Court for the Eastern District of Pennsylvania, claiming that 20-30% of the clicks for which he was charged were fraudulent, and that Google had failed to prevent that fraud. Also, Feldman claimed that he had not been given an opportunity to negotiate any of the terms in the agreement, and that the pricing information was inaccurate and insufficient. Thus, Feldman argued that the clickwrap license was not a reasonable contract per American contract law.

Google sought to have the case moved to a California court, due to the forum selection clause in the same agreement to which Feldman agreed.

== District court proceedings ==
In March 2007, Judge James T. Giles of the Eastern Pennsylvania District Court had to determine whether the clickwrap license at issue was an enforceable contract, and whether Google's motion to move the case to California per the forum selection clause was valid. Feldman's arguments were rejected and the license agreement was found to be conscionable under American contract law.

Giles ruled in favor of Google on both counts, holding that Feldman has been given ample opportunity to agree to the license terms before clicking his agreement, and that Google had explained "a practicable process by which price is determined" without the need for more precise pricing information. Thus, Feldman was bound by the agreement and he had no valid argument for being deceived or defrauded, because a reasonable computer user would find that the contract's terms were visible and the pricing plan was described appropriately.

Meanwhile, Giles held that Google's forum selection clause was a valid and enforceable provision in the license agreement. Per federal law, a clearly-stated forum selection clause within a contract is valid and enforceable, and the clause in the AdWords agreement would not "shock the conscience" of a typical consumer.

As a result, Giles denied Feldman's claims of contract law violations and ordered that any further trial on his fraud allegations and other matters take place in Google's selected court in Santa Clara, California. Feldman did not proceed with the case.

== Impact and subsequent developments ==
Feldman v. Google, Inc. is widely cited as an important and defining early precedent on the enforceability of clickwrap licenses in American contract law, as long as the user has sufficient opportunity to read the terms before clicking their agreement. The ruling has also served as a precedent for the more specific matter of click fraud and other types of fraud in Internet advertising.
