= Albert Powers =

Albert Powers may refer to:

- Albert E. Powers (1816–1910), acting president of Rensselaer Polytechnic Institute
- Albert Theodore Powers (born 1953), lawyer, business executive, and investor based in Hong Kong

== See also ==
- Albert Power (disambiguation)
