= Judge Fogel =

Judge Fogel may refer to:

- Herbert Allan Fogel (1929–2002), judge of the United States District Court for the Eastern District of Pennsylvania
- Jeremy Fogel (born 1949), judge of the United States District Court for the Northern District of California
