= Edward Cahn =

Edward Cahn may refer to:

- Edward L. Cahn (1899–1963), American film director
- Edward N. Cahn (born 1933), attorney and former United States federal judge
