= Bruzón =

Bruzon is a surname. Notable people with the surname include:

- Charles Bruzon (1938–2013), Gibraltarian politician
- Lázaro Bruzón (born 1982), Cuban chess grandmaster
- Óscar Bruzón (born 1977), Spanish footballer and manager

== See also ==
- Bruton (surname)
