= Beverly Moran =

American law professor

Beverly I. Moran is an American law professor. She is Professor Emerita of Law at Vanderbilt University. Moran was also a professor at the University of Wisconsin and served as director of the Wisconsin Center on Law and Africa. She has testified and written about tax havens.

She attended Vassar College and the University of Pennsylvania Law School.

She has written that the U.S. tax code is not progressive. She has advocated for the American Bar Association to offer online courses. She wrote about a proposed wealth tax on billionaires in the United States stating it would violate constitutional provisions. She suggested other means to achieving the same end. In 2022 she wrote about the desirability of a tax return free tax filing system for filers for whom the government already has the relevant data. She has written about tax havens including South Dakota.

== Written work ==
- The Tax Law of Charities and Other Exempt Organizations
- Basic Federal Income Taxation of Individuals with Richard A. Westin
- Aftermath: The Clinton Impeachment and the Presidency in the Age of Political Spectacle edited with Leonard V. Kaplan

== See also ==
- List of Penn Law School alumni
- List of University of Pennsylvania academics
