= Curtis R. Reitz =

American legal academic

Professor Curtis Randall Reitz
- Born: November 20, 1929; Reading, Pennsylvania
- Died: April 2, 2025 (aged 95)
- Title: Algernon Sydney Biddle Professor of Law

Academic background
- Education: University of Pennsylvania (A.B. 1952); University of Pennsylvania Law School (LL.B. 1956)

Academic work
- Institutions: University of Pennsylvania Law School

Curtis Randall Reitz (November 20, 1929 – April 2, 2025) was the Algernon Sydney Biddle Professor of Law at the University of Pennsylvania Law School.

== Biography ==
Reitz was born in Reading, Pennsylvania. His father was a jeweler, and his mother was a teacher. He attended Reading High School.

He received his A.B. in History from the University of Pennsylvania in 1951 (Phi Beta Kappa). He then spent two years in the armed forces during the Korean War. Reitz then earned his LL.B. summa cum laude from the University of Pennsylvania Law School in 1956. He served as the editor-in-chief of the University of Pennsylvania Law Review from 1955 to 1956. At Penn Law he was a student of A. Leo Levin, and a research assistant for Professor Louis B. Schwartz. He then worked as a law clerk to United States Supreme Court Chief Justice Earl Warren from 1956 to 1957.

He was the Algernon Sydney Biddle Professor of Law at the University of Pennsylvania Law School. He has taught at the law school since 1957. The Penn Law Class of 1968 created the Class of 1968 Scholarship Fund Honoring Curtis R. Reitz, which provides financial support to LL.M. students at the school.

Reitz has represented Pennsylvania for 25 years in the National Conference of Commissioners on Uniform State Laws, and was chair of the Conference's Committee on International Legal Developments. He also participated in the revision of the Uniform Commercial Code. His later work has focused on international commercial law, including aspects of the World Trade Organization's operations.

== Selected publications ==
- Cases and Materials on International Regulation of Trade and Investment (2006)
- Sales and Transactions: Domestic and International Law (3d ed. 2006)
- The Law of Sales and Secured Financing (with John Honnold, Steven L. Harris, and Charles W. Mooney Jr.) (7th ed. 2002)
- Cases, Problems and Materials on Sales Transactions: Domestic and International Law (with John Honnold) (1992)
- Construction Lenders' Liability to Contractors, Subcontractors, and Materialmen, in Construction Litigation (K. Cushman, Ed. 1981)
- Federal Habeas Corpus: Impact of an Abortive State Proceeding, 74 Harv. L. Rev. 1315 (1961)

== See also ==
- List of law clerks for the chief justice of the United States
