= George Washington Biddle =

American lawyer (1843–1886)

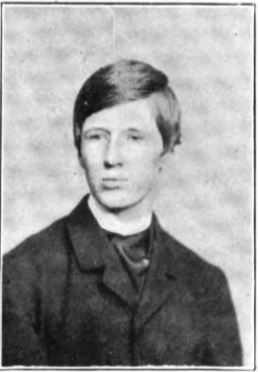
George Washington Biddle

George Washington Biddle Jr. (August 21, 1843 – April 9, 1886) was an American lawyer and writer of A Treatise on the Law of Stock Brokers with his brother Arthur Biddle.

The Biddle Law Library at the University of Pennsylvania was founded by George Washington Biddle Sr., who donated more than 5,000 law books in memory of his son George Jr.

== Biography ==
Biddle, the eldest son of George W. and Maria (McMurtrie) Biddle, was born in Philadelphia, Pennsylvania, August 21, 1843, and entered Yale College in May of the Sophomore year, graduating in 1863.

Soon after graduation he began the study of law in his father's office. In November, 1866, he was admitted to the bar of his native city, and he practiced his profession in connection with his father until his death. His siblings were Algernon Sydney Biddle and Arthur Biddle.

In conjunction with his brother Arthur he published A Treatise on the Law of Stock Brokers (Philadelphia, 1882, 8°), which has become a recognized authority.

== Personal life and death ==
During the winter of 1885–86, he was several times prostrated with nervous exhaustion, from which, it is probable, he had not fully rallied on returning to work. After only three or four days' illness, of cerebro-spinal meningitis, he died at his residence in Philadelphia, April 9, 1886, in the 43rd year of his life.

He married November 8, 1876, Mary H. R., daughter of J. Kearney Rodgers, of New York City, who survived him with three daughters.
