= Timothy J. Savage =

American judge (born 1946)

Senior Judge of the United States District Court for the Eastern District of Pennsylvania
- Incumbent
- Assumed office March 1, 2021

Judge of the United States District Court for the Eastern District of Pennsylvania
- In office August 1, 2002 – March 1, 2021
- Appointed by: George W. Bush
- Preceded by: Edward N. Cahn
- Succeeded by: Mia Roberts Perez

Personal details
- Born: March 24, 1946 (age 80) Philadelphia, Pennsylvania, U.S.
- Education: Assumption College (BA); Temple University (JD)

Timothy J. Savage (born March 24, 1946) is a senior United States district judge of the United States District Court for the Eastern District of Pennsylvania.

== Education and career ==
Savage was born in Philadelphia and graduated from Holy Ghost Preparatory School in 1964. He received a Bachelor of Arts degree from Assumption College (now Assumption University) in 1968. He received a Juris Doctor from Temple University School of Law in 1971. He was in private practice in Pennsylvania from 1971 to 2002. He was a Hearing examiner for the Pennsylvania Liquor Control Board from 1976 to 2002.

=== Federal judicial service ===
On March 21, 2002, President George W. Bush nominated Savage to serve as a United States district judge of the United States District Court for the Eastern District of Pennsylvania. He was nominated to the seat vacated by Judge Edward N. Cahn. He was confirmed by the United States Senate on August 1, 2002, and received his commission the same day. He assumed senior status on March 1, 2021.

=== Notable rulings ===
On November 29, 2012, Savage ruled that the mother of a daughter with pervasive development disorder (PDD), a form of autism, was entitled to take time off under the Family and Medical Leave Act (FMLA) to find alternative daycare arrangements for her daughter. Her daughter was blind in one eye in addition to having autism. Savage wrote: “What is relevant is that Carolyn has a chronic, serious health condition resulting in an inability to perform regular daily activities and Wegelin had to make arrangements to find a suitable daycare that could care for her.”

In oral arguments on November 4, 2020, Savage appeared skeptical of the Pennsylvania GOP's attempt to prevent Montgomery County from counting absentee ballots that voters were permitted to fix after they were notified of deficiencies. “In other words I am losing my vote?” Savage asked the Pennsylvania GOP's lawyer. On November 6, Savage rejected the state GOP's effort to throw out the "cured" absentee ballots that once contained errors.

On December 22, 2020, Savage ruled that Philadelphia restaurants are not entitled to coverage for lost business during COVID-19 related closures.

== Sources ==
Legal offices
Preceded by Edward N. Cahn	Judge of the United States District Court for the Eastern District of Pennsylvania; 2002–2021	Succeeded by Mia Roberts Perez
