= Allan Kuhn Grim =

American judge (1904–1965)

Senior Judge of the United States District Court for the Eastern District of Pennsylvania
- In office November 1, 1961 – December 7, 1965

Judge of the United States District Court for the Eastern District of Pennsylvania
- In office October 21, 1949 – November 1, 1961
- Appointed by: Harry S. Truman
- Preceded by: Seat established by 63 Stat. 493
- Succeeded by: Ralph C. Body

Personal details
- Born: Allan Kuhn Grim; October 15, 1904 Kutztown, Pennsylvania, U.S.
- Died: December 7, 1965 (aged 61) Philadelphia, Pennsylvania, U.S.
- Party: Democratic
- Education: Swarthmore College (AB); Harvard University (LLB)

Allan Kuhn Grim (October 15, 1904 – December 7, 1965) was a United States district judge of the United States District Court for the Eastern District of Pennsylvania.

== Education and career ==
Born in Kutztown, Pennsylvania, Grim received an Artium Baccalaureus degree from Swarthmore College in 1924 and a Bachelor of Laws from Harvard Law School in 1929. He was in private practice in Reading, Pennsylvania, from 1929 to 1949. He was Chairman of the Berks County, Pennsylvania Democratic Party Committee from 1940 to 1944.

== Federal judicial service ==
On October 21, 1949, Grim received a recess appointment from President Harry S. Truman to a new seat on the United States District Court for the Eastern District of Pennsylvania created by 63 Stat. 493. Formally nominated to the same seat by President Truman on January 5, 1950, Grim was confirmed by the United States Senate on April 4, 1950, and received his commission on April 7, 1950. He assumed senior status due to a certified disability on November 1, 1961, serving in that capacity until his death on December 7, 1965, in Philadelphia, Pennsylvania.

== Sources ==
Legal offices
Preceded by Seat established by 63 Stat. 493	Judge of the United States District Court for the Eastern District of Pennsylvania; 1949–1961	Succeeded by Ralph C. Body
