= Mia Roberts Perez =

American judge (born 1981)

Mia Perez
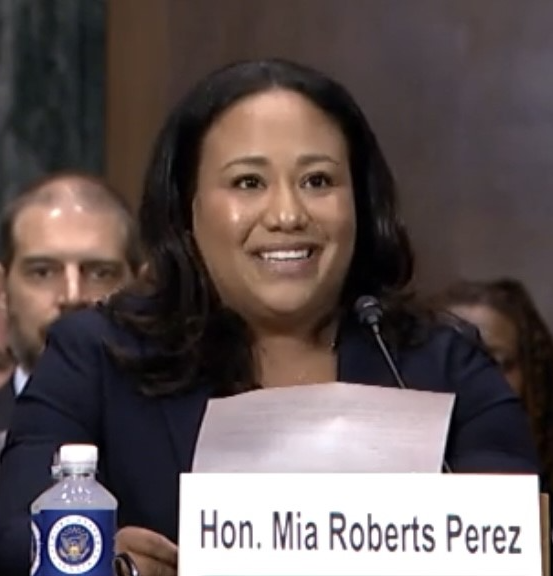

Judge of the United States District Court for the Eastern District of Pennsylvania
- Incumbent
- Assumed office December 16, 2022
- Appointed by: Joe Biden
- Preceded by: Timothy J. Savage

Judge of the Philadelphia County Court of Common Pleas
- In office January 2016 – December 16, 2022

Personal details
- Born: Mia Roberts; 1981 (age 44–45) Philadelphia, Pennsylvania, U.S.
- Party: Democratic
- Education: Tufts University (BA); Temple University (JD)

Mia Roberts Perez (born 1981) is an American attorney who is a United States district judge of the United States District Court for the Eastern District of Pennsylvania. She previously served as a judge on the Philadelphia County Court of Common Pleas from 2016 to 2022.

== Education ==
Perez earned a Bachelor of Arts degree from Tufts University in 2003 and a Juris Doctor from the Temple University Beasley School of Law in 2006.

== Career ==
From 2006 to 2010, Perez worked as an assistant public defender for the Defender Association of Philadelphia. From 2010 to 2011, Perez was an associate at Friedman Schuman in Philadelphia. From 2011 to 2016, she operated her own law firm, Perez Law LLC, in Philadelphia. Perez was elected to the Philadelphia County Court of Common Pleas in 2015.

=== Federal judicial service ===
On July 12, 2022, President Joe Biden nominated Perez to serve as a United States district judge of the United States District Court for the Eastern District of Pennsylvania. President Biden nominated Perez to the seat vacated by Judge Timothy J. Savage, who assumed senior status on March 1, 2021. On September 7, 2022, a hearing on her nomination was held before the Senate Judiciary Committee. On September 28, 2022, her nomination was reported out of committee by a 13–9 vote. On December 7, 2022, the United States Senate confirmed her nomination by a 52–43 vote. She received her judicial commission on December 16, 2022.

== See also ==
- List of African-American federal judges
- List of African-American jurists
- List of Asian American jurists
- List of Hispanic and Latino American jurists

Legal offices
Preceded by Timothy J. Savage	Judge of the United States District Court for the Eastern District of Pennsylvania; 2022–present	Incumbent
