= Albert Power =

Albert Power may refer to:

- Albert Power (priest) (1870–1948), Irish priest, academic, and author
- Albert Power (sculptor) (1881–1945), Irish artist

== See also ==
- Albert Powers (disambiguation)
