= Edgar B. Graves =

American historian

Edgar Baldwin Graves (1898 – March 24, 1983) was an American medievalist and professor of history at Hamilton College in Clinton, New York. His primary area of expertise was medieval English law and the relationship between royal and ecclesiastical jurisdictions.

Graves was born in Philadelphia, where he attended the Penn Charter School and Haverford College. At Haverford, he studied with the eminent medievalist W. E. Lunt, who taught courses on English constitutional history and did pioneering research on papal financial records. Graves would maintain a close working relationship with Lunt for many years until the latter's death in 1956. Following graduation from Haverford, Graves continued on to Harvard where he completed a Ph.D. under the supervision of Charles Homer Haskins.

From 1927 until his retirement in 1969, Graves taught history at Hamilton College in central New York state. His scholarship focused on a few select issues in English legal history, particularly the relationship between the Crown and ecclesiastical courts, including the papal rota. Later, he would see to completion the massive two-volume work begun by his mentor Lunt on papal finances in England. In 1975, Graves completed his magnum opus, a revised and updated edition of Charles Gross's Bibliography of English History to 1485 (Oxford). Graves died in 1983 and his papers were deposited at the Pontifical Institute of Mediaeval Studies in Toronto. Friends and former students later established an endowed professorship in his memory in the Hamilton College history department.
