= George Haskins =

American legal academic

George Lee Haskins
- Born: February 13, 1915; Cambridge, Massachusetts, U.S.
- Died: October 4, 1991 (aged 76); Hancock, Maine, U.S.
- Occupation: Law professor
- Title: Algernon Sydney Biddle Professor of Law
- Board member of: Fellow of the Royal Historical Society; President of the American Society for Legal History
- Parent(s): Charles Homer Haskins and Clare (Allen) Haskins
- Awards: Guggenheim Fellow; Army Commendation Medal with oak leaf clusters; George Medal

Academic background
- Education: Harvard University (AB, JD); Merton College, Oxford

Academic work
- Institutions: University of Pennsylvania Law School

George Lee Haskins RHS (February 13, 1915 – October 4, 1991) was an American legal scholar and the Algernon Sydney Biddle Professor of Law at the University of Pennsylvania Law School.

== Biography ==
Haskins was the son of medievalist Charles Homer Haskins, Dean of the College of Arts and Sciences at Harvard University. He was born and grew up in Cambridge, Massachusetts.

He was a graduate of Phillips Exeter Academy (1931), Harvard University (AB, summa cum laude, 1935), and Harvard Law School (Juris Doctor, 1942). Haskins was a Guggenheim Fellow, and was a Henry Fellow at Merton College of Oxford University. He enlisted during World War 2, and rose to become a major in military intelligence in the War Department General Staff, receiving the Army Commendation Medal with oak leaf clusters and—from the British government—the George Medal.

Haskins was the Algernon Sydney Biddle Professor of Law at the University of Pennsylvania Law School, the oldest of the endowed chairs at the law school. He taught at the law school for 39 years.

He wrote at least ten books and 82 articles. Haskins was a Fellow of the Royal Historical Society, and President of the American Society for Legal History. He died on October 4, 1991, at his home in Hancock, Maine.
