= Paul Bruton =

- Born: Paul Wesley Bruton; August 1, 1903
- Died: July 16, 1988 (aged 84)
- Occupation: Law professor
- Title: the Ferdinand Wakeman Hubbell Professor of Law and the Algernon Sydney Biddle Professor of Law

Academic background
- Education: University of California (A.B. and LL.B. 1929); Yale University (J.S.D. 1930)

Academic work
- Institutions: University of Pennsylvania Law School

Paul Wesley Bruton (August 1, 1903 – July 16, 1988) was the Ferdinand Wakeman Hubbell Professor of Law and the Algernon Sydney Biddle Professor of Law at the University of Pennsylvania Law School.

== Biography ==
Bruton received his A.B. and his LL.B. in 1929 from the University of California, and his J.S.D. in 1930 from Yale University.

Bruton was the Ferdinand Wakeman Hubbell Professor of Law and the Algernon Sydney Biddle Professor of Law at the University of Pennsylvania Law School, at which he started teaching in 1937. He taught at the law school for 37 years. He was Acting Dean of the law school during 1951 to 1952.

Among his writings were Constitutional Law: Cases and Materials, with Edward Louis Barrett and John Honnold (Foundation Press, 1968) and Bruton's Cases and materials on Federal taxation, with Raymond J. Bradley (West Pub. Co., 1953).
