= Jo Bruton =

British artist

Jo Bruton (born 1967) is a British artist.

Bruton studied at the West Sussex College of Art & Design, the Exeter College of Art and Design and the Chelsea College of Art and Design.

Her work is included in the collection of the Tate Museum, London, and the British Council.
