= Haskins Society =

Medieval studies society

The Charles Homer Haskins Society, named for the Harvard medievalist Charles Homer Haskins, is a scholarly society founded in 1982. It is "dedicated to studying the history and cultures of peoples in northwest Europe in the early and central Middle Ages, and their encounters with societies in the Mediterranean, the Baltic and the larger medieval world".

The Society publishes the annual peer reviewed Haskins Society Journal: Studies in Medieval History, part of the Cambridge Core.

The Society's annual conference has been hosted at University of Houston (1982–1996); Cornell University (1998–2003); Georgetown University (2004–2008); Boston College (2009–2013); Carleton College (2014–2016); University of North Carolina at Chapel Hill (2017–2021); University of Richmond (2022–2024); University of Miami (2025–present). It also sponsors sessions at the International Congress on Medieval Studies (Kalamazoo), the International Medieval Congress (Leeds), and the American Historical Association's annual meeting.

The Haskins Society is an affiliate of the American Historical Association.

== History ==
The Society was founded by the students of C. Warren Hollister at the University of California, Santa Barbara; Hollister was its first president and continued until his death in 1997.
