= Ralph C. Body =

American judge

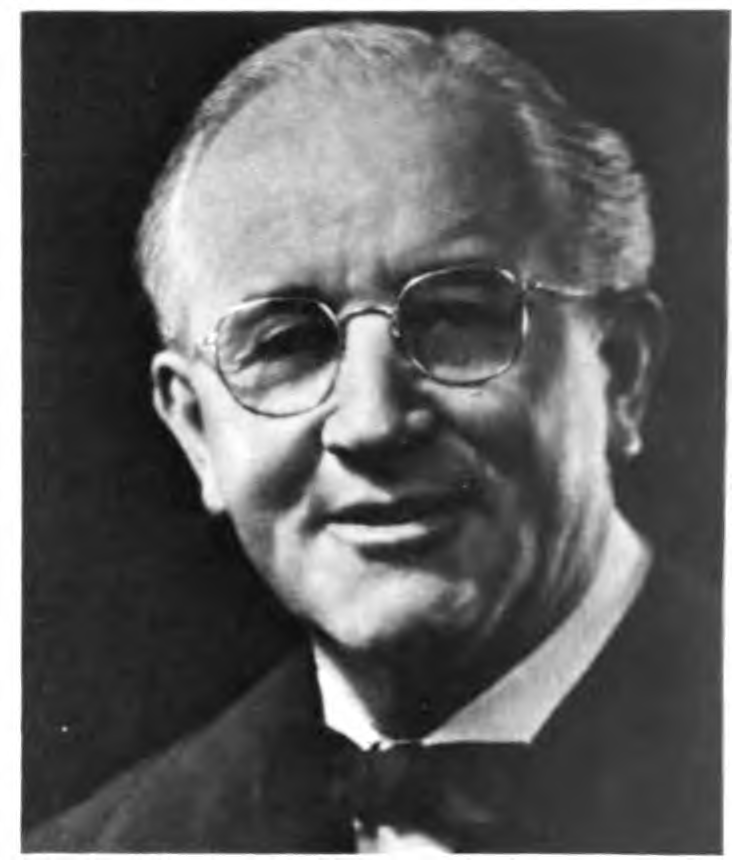

Senior Judge of the United States District Court for the Eastern District of Pennsylvania
- In office May 30, 1972 – June 2, 1973

Judge of the United States District Court for the Eastern District of Pennsylvania
- In office April 4, 1962 – May 30, 1972
- Appointed by: John F. Kennedy
- Preceded by: Allan Kuhn Grim
- Succeeded by: Herbert Allan Fogel

Personal details
- Born: Ralph Clyde Body; February 18, 1903 Yellow House, Pennsylvania, U.S.
- Died: June 2, 1973 (aged 70)
- Education: Pennsylvania State University (BA); University of Pennsylvania (LLB)

Ralph Clyde Body (February 18, 1903 – June 2, 1973) was a United States district judge of the United States District Court for the Eastern District of Pennsylvania.

== Education and career ==
Born in Yellow House, Pennsylvania, Body received an Artium Baccalaureus degree from Pennsylvania State University in 1925. He received a Bachelor of Laws from University of Pennsylvania Law School in 1928. He was in private practice of law in Pennsylvania from 1928 to 1960. He was solicitor for the Recorder of Deeds for the Commonwealth of Pennsylvania from 1933 to 1936. He worked for the Home Owners' Loan Corporation from 1933 to 1941. He was an assistant county solicitor in Pennsylvania from 1936 to 1938. He was a member of the Berks County Board Law Examiners from 1946 to 1960. He was a judge of the Court of Common Pleas of Berks County from 1960 to 1962.

== Federal judicial service ==
Body was nominated by president John F. Kennedy on March 5, 1962, to a seat on the United States District Court for the Eastern District of Pennsylvania vacated by Judge Allan Kuhn Grim. He was confirmed by the United States Senate on April 2, 1962, and received his commission on April 4, 1962. He assumed senior status due to a certified disability on May 30, 1972. His service was terminated on June 2, 1973, due to his death.

== Sources ==
Legal offices
Preceded by Allan Kuhn Grim	Judge of the United States District Court for the Eastern District of Pennsylvania; 1962–1972	Succeeded by Herbert Allan Fogel
