= Jan Buckner Walker =

American crossword compiler

Jan Buckner Walker (born 1963) is a nationally syndicated (in the United States) crossword puzzle creator, author and games creator.

== Early life and education ==
Buckner Walker was born in Cleveland, Ohio and grew up in Silver Spring, Maryland with her sister, Lori. She graduated with a Bachelor of Arts in journalism from Howard University in 1985 and subsequently earned her Juris Doctor from the University of Pennsylvania Law School where she also served as an editor for the school's Law Review. After two years of law firm practice, she moved to Chicago, Illinois where she continued practicing law. During this time, she began volunteer tutoring and seeking creative ways to engage her students. She then wrote several children's picture book manuscripts and worked with a marketing firm creating web strategies.

== Career as a creator ==
She is best known for her creation and distribution of the Kids Across Parents Down (KAPD) family crossword series. Dubbed "The Original Crossword Puzzle for Kids and Their Favorite Adults," the collaborative puzzles are distributed weekly through Tribune Media Services and feature across clues for children and down clues for parents.

All of the puzzles center on a lively and contemporary theme familiar to children and intriguing to parents with an eye toward fostering both family interaction and literacy. The series are primarily freeform style crosswords that focus on clever word play and quirky humor over the classic academic rigor of American-style (or newspaper–style crosswords), so a children's clue might be "What do you get when a cow dances?" (9 letters) (Answer: MILKSHAKE) while for adults a clue might be "What you find on the outside of every Will Smith compact disc" (7 letters) (Answer: RAPPER).

Since its first appearance in 2003 in The Washington Post's Kids Post, versions of the crosswords have been picked up by several publications, including the Los Angeles Times, Chicago Tribune, Detroit Free Press, Atlanta Journal-Constitution, Nickelodeon's Nick Jr. Family Magazine and Jack and Jill Magazine.

In 2007, the puzzles spawned a book series, launching with two titles to date, Crazy Critters and On the Go and also provides puzzle content for kids menus and other programs offered by various family-friendly venues, such as Cracker Barrel and McDonald's restaurants. Buckner Walker has also created billboard-size puzzles for the annual Los Angeles Times Book Festival held at University of California, Los Angeles and at events sponsored by the Boston Celtics.

In 2009, Buckner Walker launched Kids Across Teachers Down, a classroom version which extended the collaborative learning formula into schools. First published online at www.chicagotribune.com, the crossword encourages competition and collaboration with class vs. classroom and school vs. school tournaments.

Buckner Walker has also produced a number of other family activity brands, including First Letter Fun (a picture-based crossword puzzle for new and pre-readers) and Blackout (a multi-level puzzle slated for a book series and smart phone applications).

Buckner Walker is also well known for her creation of ethnic-oriented general interest crosswords for magazines such as Essence, Ebony and Rise Up. Previously, none of these publications had offered crosswords and, as such, she is credited with generating a groundswell of interest in crossword puzzles among members of the African-American community.

In 2010 Buckner Walker created UnhappenIt, dubbed "The Apology App," which provides users a quick and easy way to apologize online or via the Android smart phone, offering proposed language, recommended downloadable songs and various gifts to express a message apology. With its integration with Facebook and Twitter, the application also allows members to see and rank the apologies of others and to suggest songs for inclusion in the music database. Since its launch, the term "unhappen" has gained a viral momentum in social media and elsewhere and has been used by various journalists, media personalities and others in reference to one's desire to go back in time before an unfortunate occurrence.

== Awards ==
Kids Across Parents Down was awarded the Mr. Dad Seal of Approval and has been recognized by Fast Company as a "Rising Star" in its Fast 50 Companies competition. Additionally, following the release of the KAPD books, New York Times editor Will Shortz applauded the collaborative family concept as "a clever, fun way to introduce kids to crosswords and get their favorite adults involved at the same time," calling the puzzles "simultaneously whimsical and educational."

Buckner Walker, who was the recipient of the Goldstein Award for Excellence in Labor Law, was published in the University of Pennsylvania Law School Review in 1988.
