= Harvard Studies in Classical Philology =

- Discipline: Classics
- Language: English

Publication details
- History: 1890–present
- Publisher: Harvard University Press

Standard abbreviations
- ISO 4: Harv. Stud. Class. Philol.

Indexing
- ISSN: 0073-0688
- JSTOR: harvstudclasphil
- OCLC no.: 839185186

Links
- Journal homepage

Harvard Studies in Classical Philology (HSCPh) is a peer-reviewed academic journal covering topics in philology and classical studies, published annually. It was established in 1862 and is published by Harvard University Press. The journal is abstracted and indexed by L'Année philologique.
