= Edward N. Cahn =

American judge

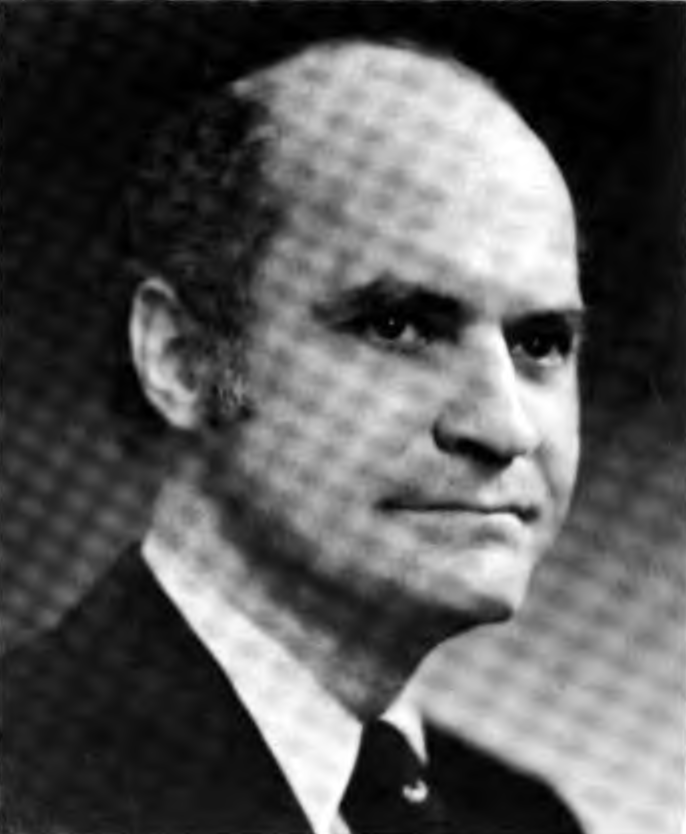

Chief Judge of the United States District Court for the Eastern District of Pennsylvania
- In office 1993–1998
- Preceded by: Louis Bechtle
- Succeeded by: James T. Giles

Judge of the United States District Court for the Eastern District of Pennsylvania
- In office December 20, 1974 – December 31, 1998
- Appointed by: Gerald Ford
- Preceded by: John Morgan Davis
- Succeeded by: Timothy J. Savage

Personal details
- Born: Edward Norman Cahn; June 29, 1933 (age 93) Allentown, Pennsylvania, U.S.
- Education: Lehigh University (BA); Yale Law School (LLB)

Edward Norman Cahn (born June 29, 1933) is a former United States district judge of the United States District Court for the Eastern District of Pennsylvania.

== Education and career ==
Cahn was born in Allentown, Pennsylvania. He attended Lehigh University, where he played basketball and set a record by becoming the first Lehigh student to score 1,000 points; he graduated magna cum laude with a Bachelor of Arts degree in 1955. Cahn continued to Yale Law School, where he earned a Bachelor of Laws in 1958. After graduation from law school, he entered private practice in Allentown, and began service in the United States Marine Corps Reserve, achieving the rank of Corporal. He left the service in 1964.

== Federal judicial service ==
Cahn was nominated by President Gerald Ford on November 18, 1974, to a seat on the United States District Court for the Eastern District of Pennsylvania vacated by Judge John Morgan Davis.

Cahn was confirmed by the United States Senate on December 18, 1974, and received his commission on December 20, 1974. He later served as Chief Judge from 1993 to 1998.

His service terminated on December 31, 1998, due to his retirement.

== Post judicial service ==
Since his retirement from the federal bench, he has served as of counsel to Blank Rome, where he remains active as of November 2023. He was appointed and approved as Chapter 11 case trustee for the SCO Group on August 25, 2009.

== Honor ==
On August 20, 2001, the Edward N. Cahn Federal Building and United States Courthouse in Allentown was renamed in his honor.

== Sources ==
- "Congressional Record" (PDF). Government Printing Office. 2001. pp. H449–H451.
- "Public Law 107–31: An Act to designate the Federal building and United States courthouse located at 504 West Hamilton Street in Allentown, Pennsylvania, as the "Edward N. Cahn Federal Building and United States Courthouse"" (PDF). Government Printing Office.
- "The honor isn't all his, ex-federal judge says". Philadelphia Business Journal. 1999-02-22.
- "SCO's Chapter 11 Trustee Appointed and Approved". Groklaw. 2009-08-25. Archived from the original on May 5, 2010.

Legal offices
Preceded by John Morgan Davis	Judge of the United States District Court for the Eastern District of Pennsylvania; 1974–1998	Succeeded by Timothy J. Savage
Preceded by Louis Bechtle	Chief Judge of the United States District Court for the Eastern District of Pennsylvania; 1993–1998	Succeeded by James T. Giles
