= Alexander F. Barbieri =

American jurist

Justice of the Pennsylvania Supreme Court
- In office January 4, 1971 – January 1972

Personal details
- Born: July 6, 1907 Philadelphia, Pennsylvania, U.S.
- Died: January 1993 (aged 85)
- Education: University of Pennsylvania; University of Pennsylvania Law School

Alexander F. Barbieri (July 6, 1907 – January 1993) was an American jurist. He served as a justice of the Pennsylvania Supreme Court from 1971 to 1972.

== Life and career ==
Barbieri was born in Philadelphia, Pennsylvania. He attended the University of Pennsylvania and the University of Pennsylvania Law School.

Barbieri was a lieutenant commander in the United States Navy from 1942 to 1946.

In 1971, Governor Raymond Shafer appointed Barbieri to serve as a justice of the Pennsylvania Supreme Court.

Barbieri died in January 1993 at his home in Chestnut Hill, at the age of 85.
