= Alfredo Toro Hardy =

Venezuelan diplomat (born 1950)

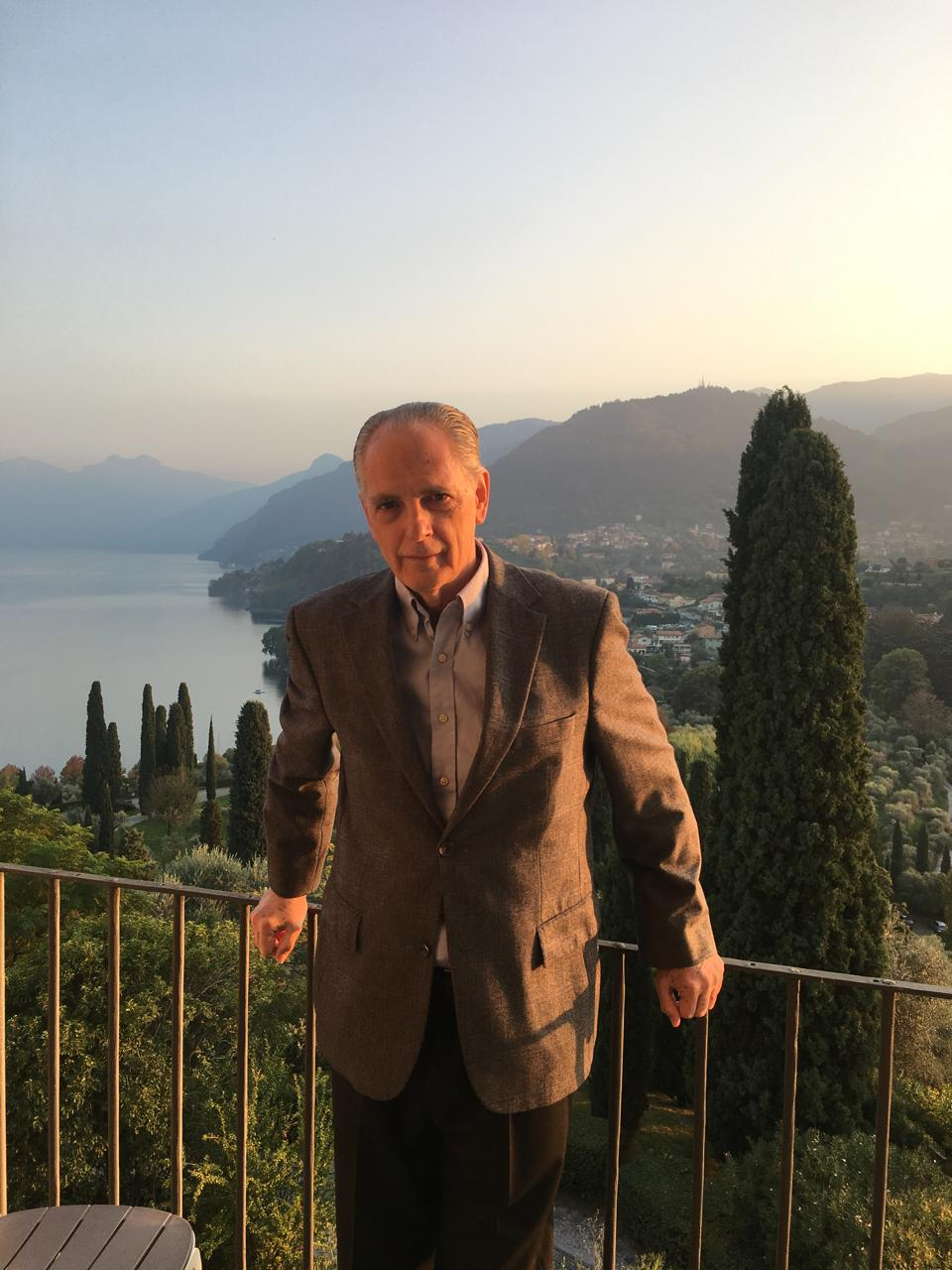

Personal details
- Born: 22 May 1950 (age 76) Caracas, Venezuela
- Children: 3
- Education: Central University of Venezuela; University of Pennsylvania School of Law; Geneva School of Diplomacy and International Relations

Alfredo Toro Hardy (born 1950) is a Venezuelan established international relations scholar, author and retired career diplomat. He served as ambassador to several countries, including the United States, the United Kingdom, Spain, and Brazil, between the early 1990s and 2017. He has authored or co-authored 36 books on international relations, with an emphasis on the historical evolution and the changing nature of world power, and remains as an active commentator and columnist in this area.

== Education ==
Toro Hardy graduated with a law degree from the Central University of Venezuela (UCV). He earned a diploma in diplomatic studies from the École nationale d'administration and a diploma in comparative law from the Paris-Panthéon-Assas University in 1975. He received a M.S. from UCV and his Master of Laws from the University of Pennsylvania in 1979. He has a doctorate in International Relations from the Geneva School of Diplomacy and International Relations.

== Career ==
Toro Hardy was a Member of the Advising Committee of London's Diplomatic Academy (University of Westminster, London) in 2004-2007. He was a visiting professor at Princeton University in 1986–1987 and the University of Brasilia in 1995–1996. He was a Fulbright Scholar in 1986–1987 and a Rockefeller Foundation Bellagio Center Resident Scholar in September 2011 and October 2017. He was an on-line professor at the University of Barcelona in 2004–2005.

Toro Hardy was elected by the Council of Faculties of the University of Cambridge as the Simón Bolívar Chair Professor for Latin American Studies for the period 2006–2007, but had to decline due to his diplomatic career. He was an associate professor at the Simón Bolívar University of Caracas, retiring in 1992. He was the Director of the Centre for North American Studies and Coordinator of the Institute for Higher Latin American Studies at the Simón Bolívar University in Caracas from 1989 to 1992. He was the Director of the Pedro Gual Diplomatic Academy of the Venezuelan Ministry of Foreign Affairs from 1992 to 1994. He is currently an Honorary Fellow of the Geneva School of Diplomacy and International Relations and a member of the Experts Review Panel of the Rockefeller Foundation Bellagio Center.

Toro Hardy is the author or co-author of thirty six books and numerous academic articles on international affairs. The English version of his book The Age of Villages won the International Latino Book Award (best book by an author whose original language is Spanish or Portuguese) in the category of contemporary history/political sciences, at the BookExpo America in Chicago in 2003, while his book Hegemony and Empire won the same prize at the same category at the BookExpo America in Los Angeles in 2008. His books The World Turned Upside Down: The Complex Partnership Between China and Latin America (2013) and The Crossroads of Globalization: A Latin American View (2019) were reviewed in Foreign Affairs, while his book China versus the US: Who Will Prevail? (2020) was reviewed in International Affairs (journal). In an extensive review of South American books, the online cataloguer Library Thing choose the first of the above mentioned publications as one of the nine basic background readings to understand that region. He was a weekly columnist at the Venezuelan newspaper El Universal for more than three decades and remains as a regular columnist in analytical digital publications of Latin America, the United States and Europe.

His past ambassadorial posts are the following:

- Ambassador to Brazil (1994–1997)
- Ambassador to Chile (1997–1999)
- Ambassador to the United States (1999–2001)
- Ambassador to the United Kingdom (2001–2007)
- Ambassador to the Republic of Ireland (2001–2007)
- Ambassador to Spain (2007–2009)
- Ambassador to Singapore (2009–2017)

His Global Policy columnist biography says that he resigned from the Venezuelan Ministry of Foreign Affairs in 2017 "in protest for the authoritarian outreach of the government".
