= Francis Bohlen =

American cricketer and legal scholar

Francis Hermann Bohlen
- Born: Francis Hermann Bohlen; July 31, 1868; Chestnut Hill, Philadelphia, Pennsylvania, U.S.
- Died: December 9, 1942 (aged 74); Wynnewood, Pennsylvania, U.S.
- Occupations: Law professor and cricket player
- Known for: Torts scholar and cricket player
- Title: Algernon Sydney Biddle professor of law

Academic background
- Education: University of Pennsylvania (Bachelor of Laws, 1892); University of Pennsylvania Law School (Doctor of Laws, 1929)

Academic work
- Institutions: University of Pennsylvania Law School

Francis Hermann Bohlen (July 31, 1868 – December 9, 1942) was an American legal scholar from Pennsylvania who specialized in tort law and served as the Algernon Sydney Biddle professor of law at the University of Pennsylvania Law School.

== Biography ==
Bohlen was born in Chestnut Hill, Philadelphia, Pennsylvania, to John and Priscilla Murray Bohlen. He was a descendant of the von Bohlen family of Prussia. He attended Miss Havens School in Philadelphia. He graduated from St. Paul’s School in Concord, New Hampshire (1884) and the University of Pennsylvania (Bachelor of Laws, 1892). He was awarded an honorary degree by the University of Pennsylvania Law School (Doctor of Laws, 1929).

Apart from his scholarly work, he played cricket at a high level as an amateur, competing in England and representing the London County Cricket Club, Marylebone Cricket Club, Free Foresters, and the Philadelphian cricket team .

Bohlen was the Algernon Sydney Biddle professor of law at the University of Pennsylvania Law School. He was an expert on the law of torts, and also taught evidence and contracts. He retired from teaching in 1937. He was known as a leading theorist of the Realist years in torts theory, though he was not a Realist himself.

Among his writings were A Short Selection of Cases on the Law of Torts: Texas, and Other Cases on Torts (Bobbs-Merrill, 1933), Commentaries on Torts: Restatement, Issue 3 (American Law Institute, 1927), and Studies in the law of torts (Bobbs-Merrill Company, 1926).

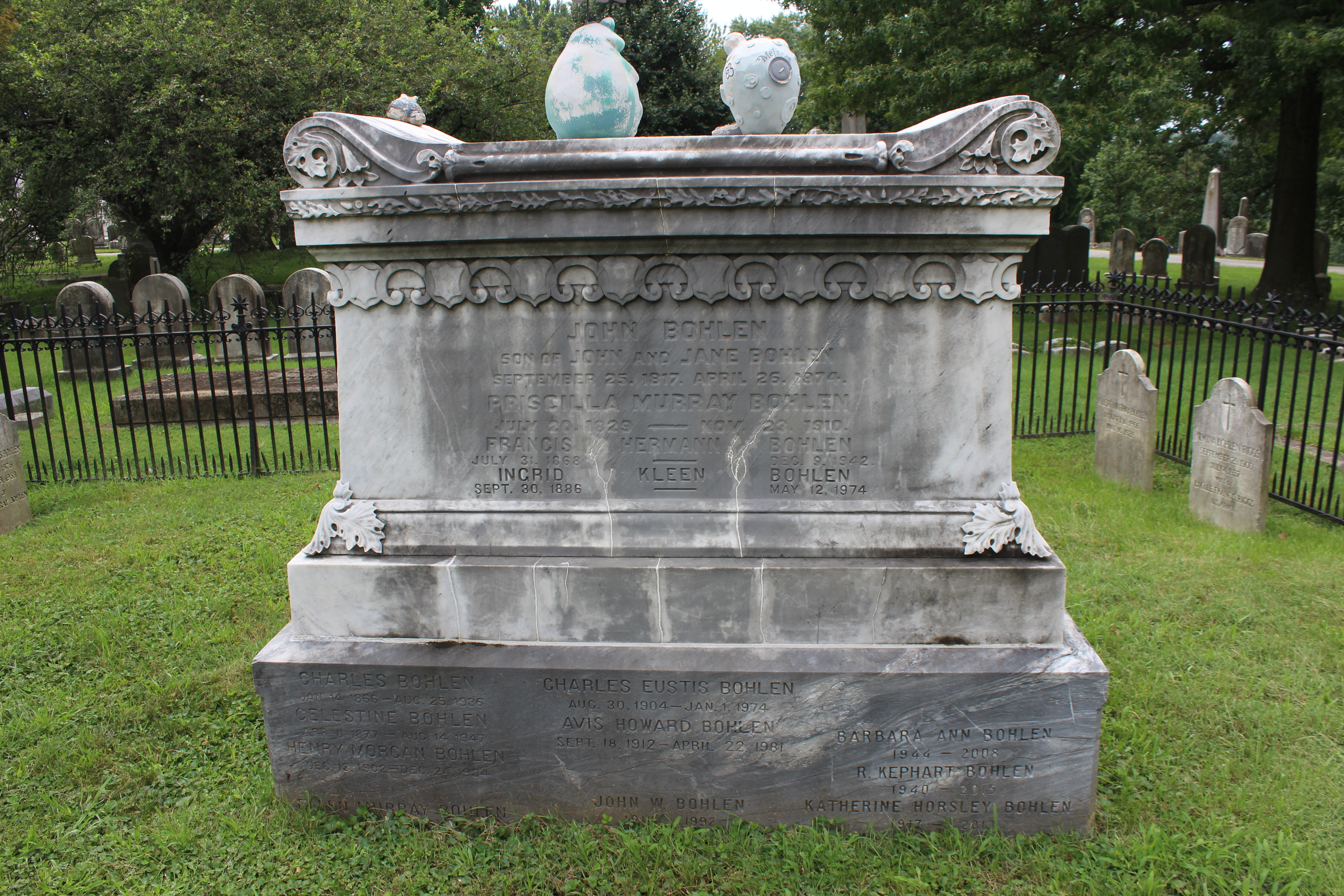
Francis is interred in the Bohlen Family Plot at Laurel Hill Cemetery in Philadelphia

He died on December 9, 1942, in Wynnewood, Pennsylvania, at age 74. He is interred in the Bohlen family crypt at Laurel Hill Cemetery in Philadelphia.
