= Donna Bruton =

American visual artist (1954–2012)

- Born: Donnamaria Bruton; May 3, 1954; Milwaukee, Wisconsin, United States
- Died: September 9, 2012 (aged 58); Portsmouth, Rhode Island, United States
- Other names: Donna Bruton-Coutis
- Education: Michigan State University, Yale University
- Occupation(s): Visual artist, teacher, arts administrator
- Known for: Collage, painting
- Spouse: Tim Coutis
- Father: Bill Bruton
- Relatives: Judy Johnson (maternal grandfather)

Donna Bruton (May 3, 1954 – September 9, 2012; née Donnamaria Bruton, also known as Donna Bruton-Coutis) was an American painter, academic administrator, and educator. She was a faculty member at the Rhode Island School of Design, and was known for her mixed media paintings and collages.

== Early life and education ==
Donnamaria Bruton was born on May 3, 1954, in Milwaukee, Wisconsin. Her father was baseball player Bill Bruton, and her grandfather on her mother's side was Negro leagues player Judy Johnson.

She received a Bachelor of Fine Arts from Michigan State University, and a Master of Fine Arts from Yale University. She studied under painter Edward Loper and exhibited with Dell Pryor in Detroit. She married Timothy Coutis in January 1999.

== Career ==
Bruton worked at RISD starting in 1992, serving as painting department head from 2001 to 2003, and as interim dean of graduate studies from 2003 to 2005.

Bruton's style, described by The Providence Journal as "a loose free-flowing style.... but with a strong realistic streak," makes use of her drawing, painting and collage skills. Many of her collages employ mundane objects as the key to getting at a deeper memory or concept. Her first solo exhibit was in 1993 in Austin, Texas, and was well received. Later in her career, the size of her works expanded, many to canvases 8 by 8 feet (2.4 by 2.4 m).

Bruton received the Blanche E. Colman Award from BNY Mellon in 1999. Her work is several museum collections, including at the RISD Museum, the Newport Art Museum, and the Gwanjiu Museum in Korea, as well as several private collections.
