= Algernon Sydney Biddle =

American lawyer and professor

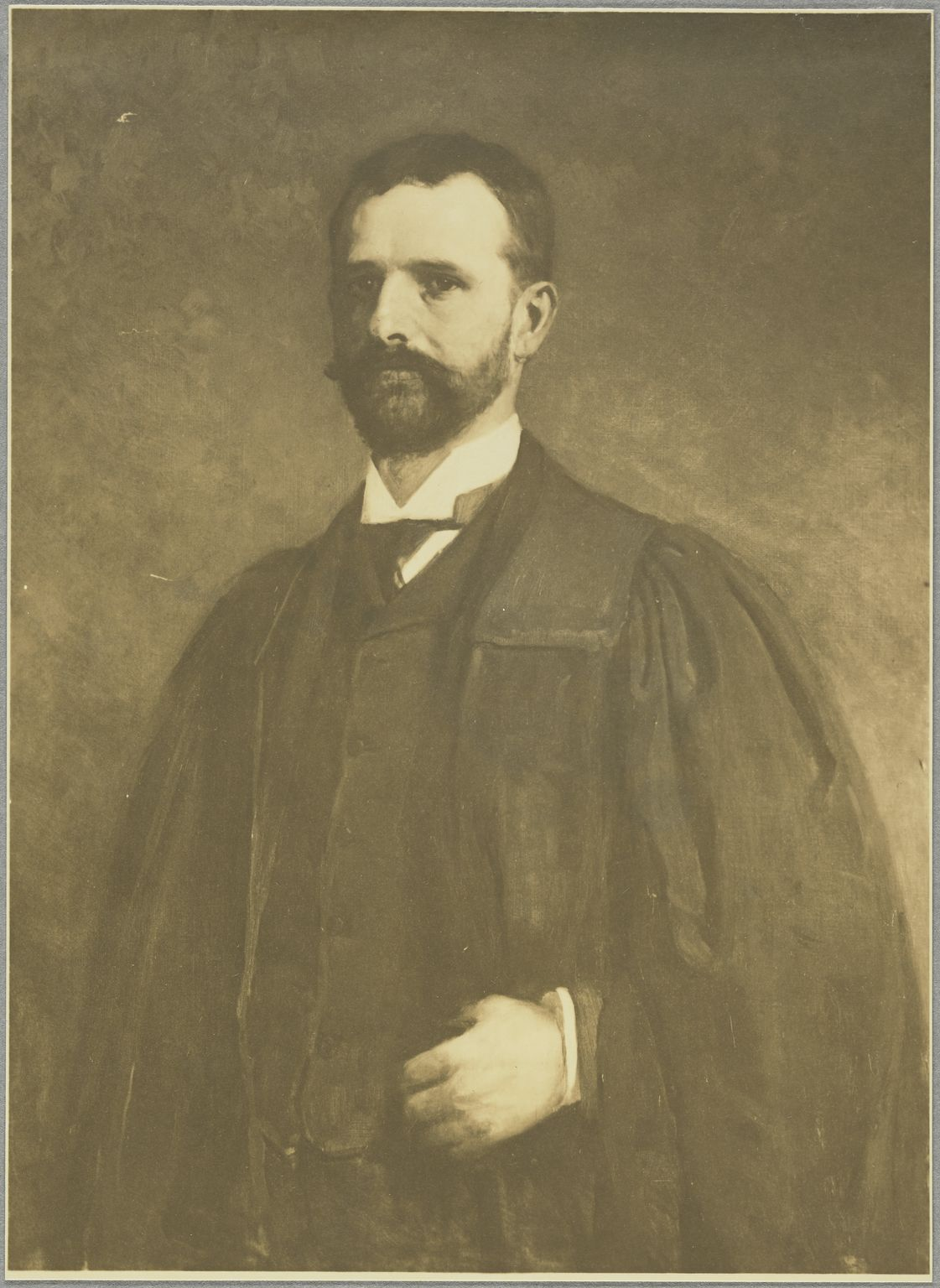
- Portrait by Cecilia Beaux
- Born: October 11, 1847; Philadelphia, Pennsylvania
- Died: April 8, 1891 (aged 43); Philadelphia, Pennsylvania
- Occupation: Law professor
- Parent(s): George Washington Biddle and Maria (McMurtie) Biddle
- Relatives: great-grandfather, Colonel Clement Biddle; siblings, George Biddle and Arthur Biddle

Academic background
- Education: Yale College; University of Berlin

Academic work
- Institutions: University of Pennsylvania Law School
- Main interests: Evidence and torts

Algernon Sydney Biddle (October 11, 1847 – April 8, 1891) was an American lawyer and law professor at the University of Pennsylvania Law School. An endowed chair was established at the University of Pennsylvania Law School in his name.

== Biography ==
Biddle was born in Philadelphia, Pennsylvania, to George Washington Biddle (a lawyer) and Maria (McMurtie) Biddle, their second child. His siblings were George Biddle and Arthur Biddle. His great-grandfather, Colonel Clement Biddle, was quartermaster in the army of George Washington during the American Revolutionary War.

He graduated from Yale College in 1868. Biddle then studied at the University of Berlin. He was admitted to the Pennsylvania Bar in 1872.

Biddle was a law professor at the University of Pennsylvania Law School from 1887 until his death, teaching evidence and torts. In 1887 to 1888 he was one of the editors of the American Law Register. He was also a member of the American Philosophical Society.

The George Biddle and Algernon Sydney Biddle Memorial Library was established at the University of Pennsylvania Law School via a gift by George W. Biddle in his memory and in the memory of George Biddle. In 1900 it had 23,000 books. The law school contains a portrait of him by society portraitist Cecilia Beaux.

An endowed chair was established at the University of Pennsylvania Law School in his name. Among the law professors who have held that chair are George Wharton Pepper, Francis Bohlen, Paul Bruton, George Haskins, and Curtis Reitz.

Biddle married Frances Brown. His children were Moncure (an investment banker), George (a muralist), Francis (who became both a corporate and public attorney, and was the primary US judge at the Nuremberg trials), and Sydney Geoffrey. Biddle died in Philadelphia.
