= Albert Theodore Powers =

Lawyer, business executive, and investor (born 1953)

Ted Powers
- Born: Albert Theodore Powers; February 11, 1953 (age 73); Norfolk, Nebraska, United States
- Education: University of Denver, Imperial College London, University of Pennsylvania Law School, and New York University Law School
- Occupations: Lawyer, business executive and investor
- Known for: Chairman and chief executive of the Allied Pacific Group
- Spouse: Victoria Mae Schulte (m. 1974)
- Children: Three, (Albert III, Elizabeth, Katherine )

Albert Theodore (“Ted”) Powers, (born February 11, 1953) is a Hong Kong based senior lawyer, business executive, and investor. He is the chairman and chief executive of the Allied Pacific Group.

Powers is a member of the boards of directors of a number of public and private companies and has over 40 years of experience in mergers and acquisitions, private equity, investments, corporate matters, real estate investment and development, energy, infrastructure, and international taxation. He has particular experience in Greater China, where he has resided and worked for over 35 years, and Southeast Asia, where he has served as a member of the boards of directors of the region's largest investment fund and the region's largest infrastructure fund.

== Early life and education ==
Powers was born in Norfolk, Nebraska in 1953. He holds a Bachelor of Arts (B.A.) degree from the University of Denver; a Master of Business Administration (M.B.A.) degree from Imperial College London; a Juris Doctor (J.D.) degree from the University of Pennsylvania Law School; and a Master of Laws (LL.M.) in Taxation degree from the New York University Law School.

== Career ==
=== Legal Practice ===
Powers practiced law in New York City, San Francisco, and Hong Kong. He served as Asian Managing Partner for several of the world's leading law firms, including Shearman & Sterling and Gibson, Dunn & Crutcher. Powers is admitted to practice law in the states of New York, California, and Colorado of the United States of America, the United States Supreme Court, and various other United States Federal Courts, and as a solicitor in Hong Kong. After graduation from law school, Powers served as law clerk to the Honorable Robert H. McWilliams, United States Circuit Court of Appeals judge.

=== Allied Pacific Group ===
Powers serves as chairman and chief executive officer of the Allied Pacific Group, a diversified investment and advisory group which is engaged in a wide range of activities, particularly in the Asia Pacific region. The Allied Pacific Group is particularly active in the investment, real property development and investment, energy, infrastructure, and private equity sectors.

=== Chateau Pomeaux ===
Powers is the chairman and principal owner of Château Pomeaux, Pomerol. Château Pomeaux is located on the southeastern slope of the Pomerol plateau near the border of the communes of Pomerol and St. Emilion. Château Pomeaux's vines, which are 100% Merlot Noir, average approximately 40 years of age. Château Pomeaux's wines, which are made under the direction of the internationally known winemaker and oenologist Michel Rolland, have received highly favorable commentary from a number of leading wine journalists.

== Publications ==
Powers is the author of a number of books and professional articles, including Federal Income Taxation of Corporations; Foreign Investors Challenged by New Real Estate Regulations; China’s Brilliance Gets New York Listing; Use of Subchapter S Corporations for Oil and Gas Investments; The Importance of Proper Tax Elections by New Corporations; Section 16(b) of the Securities Exchange Act of 1934 and Insider Trading Involving Issuer-Granted Employee Stock Options; and The Business of Baseball, published in 2003, which examines the business and economics of Major League Baseball, addresses its most significant problems, and proposes solutions.

== Personal ==
Powers has resided in Hong Kong since 1983. He has been married to the former Victoria Mae Schulte, who is a retired managing director of BNP Paribas, since 1974. They have three children and six grandchildren.
