= John Honnold =

American law professor (1915-2011)

John Otis Honnold Jr.
- Born: December 5, 1915; Kansas, Illinois
- Died: January 21, 2011 (aged 95)
- Occupation: Law professor
- Title: William A. Schnader Professor of Commercial Law

Academic background
- Education: University of Illinois (1936); Harvard Law School (1939)

John Otis Honnold Jr. (December 5, 1915 – January 21, 2011) was the William A. Schnader Professor of Commercial Law at the University of Pennsylvania Law School.

== Biography ==
Honnold was born in Kansas, Illinois, to John Otis and Louretta (Wright) Honnold, and lived in Swarthmore, Pennsylvania, and Kennett Square, Pennsylvania.

He graduated from Paris High School in Illinois. Honnold then earned a bachelor's degree in economics and government from the University of Illinois in 1936, and a law degree from Harvard Law School in 1939, where he was an editor of the Harvard Law Review. He was awarded a Fulbright Senior Research Scholarship award, a Guggenheim Fellowship, and the Theberge Prize for Private International Law.

Honnold worked at the Securities and Exchange Commission for five years. During World War II he worked as chief of the Court Review Branch in the Chief Counsel's Office of Price Administration. He began his career in private practice at a New York law firm, Wright, Gordon, Zachry & Parlin.

Honnold was the William A. Schnader Professor of Commercial Law at the University of Pennsylvania Law School, after joining the school's faculty in 1946. His academic focus was private international law.

His writings included Sales Transactions: Domestic and International Law (with Curtis Reitz) and Security Interests in Personal Property (with Steven Harris and Charles W. Mooney Jr.).

Honnold died on January 21, 2011, at 95 years of age.
