= James T. Giles =

American judge

Senior Judge of the United States District Court for the Eastern District of Pennsylvania
- In office February 11, 2008 – October 3, 2008

Chief Judge of the United States District Court for the Eastern District of Pennsylvania
- In office 1999–2005
- Preceded by: Edward N. Cahn
- Succeeded by: Harvey Bartle III

Judge of the United States District Court for the Eastern District of Pennsylvania
- In office November 27, 1979 – February 11, 2008
- Appointed by: Jimmy Carter
- Preceded by: Herbert Allan Fogel
- Succeeded by: Joel Harvey Slomsky

Personal details
- Born: James Tyrone Giles; January 31, 1943 (age 83) Charlottesville, Virginia, U.S.
- Education: Amherst College (BA); Yale University (LLB)

James Tyrone Giles (born January 31, 1943) is a former United States district judge of the United States District Court for the Eastern District of Pennsylvania.

== Education and career ==
Born in Charlottesville, Virginia, Giles received a Bachelor of Arts degree from Amherst College in 1964 and a Bachelor of Laws from Yale Law School in 1967. He was a clerk for the United States Equal Employment Opportunity Commission in 1967, and a field attorney of the National Labor Relations Board in Philadelphia, Pennsylvania, from 1967 to 1968. He was in private practice in Philadelphia from 1968 to 1979.

== Federal judicial service ==
On October 11, 1979, Giles was nominated by President Jimmy Carter to a seat on the United States District Court for the Eastern District of Pennsylvania vacated by Judge Herbert Allan Fogel. Giles was confirmed by the United States Senate on November 26, 1979, and received his commission on November 27, 1979. He served as Chief Judge from 1999 to 2005. He assumed senior status on February 11, 2008, and retired from the court completely on October 3, 2008. He thereafter returned to private practice.

== See also ==
- List of African-American federal judges
- List of African-American jurists

== Sources ==
Legal offices
Preceded by Herbert Allan Fogel	Judge of the United States District Court for the Eastern District of Pennsylvania; 1979–2008	Succeeded by Joel Harvey Slomsky
Preceded by Edward N. Cahn	Chief Judge of the United States District Court for the Eastern District of Pennsylvania; 1999–2005	Succeeded by Harvey Bartle III
