= Louis B. Schwartz =

American professor of law

- Born: Louis Brown Schwartz; February 24, 1913; Philadelphia, Pennsylvania
- Died: January 23, 2003 (aged 89); San Francisco, California
- Occupation: Law professor
- Title: Benjamin Franklin and University Professor of Law
- Spouse: Mimi Schwartz
- Children: 2 daughters
- Parent(s): Samuel (Shimon) Schwartz and Rose Brown

Academic background
- Education: Wharton School (1932); University of Pennsylvania Law School (1935)

Academic work
- Institutions: University of Pennsylvania Law School; University of California Hastings College of the Law
- Main interests: antitrust, criminal law, and professional responsibility

Louis Brown Schwartz (February 24, 1913 – January 23, 2003) was the Benjamin Franklin and University Professor of Law at the University of Pennsylvania Law School.

== Biography ==
Schwartz was born in Philadelphia, Pennsylvania, to Samuel (Shimon) Schwartz and Rose Brown. Schwartz and his first wife, Bertha, had two daughters, Johanna and Victoria Schwartz. He and his second wife, Mimi, had no children.

He graduated from the Wharton School (1932) and the University of Pennsylvania Law School (1935). Schwartz then worked as an attorney for the Securities and Exchange Commission and as head attorney in the criminal division for the U.S. Justice Department in Washington, D.C. He spent two years as an officer in the U.S. Navy.

Schwartz was the Benjamin Franklin and University Professor of Law at the University of Pennsylvania Law School, having joined the faculty in 1946. He taught courses in antitrust, criminal law, and professional responsibility. He retired from Penn in 1983. The New York Times said he was "an influential legal scholar whose work helped bring about significant changes in the penal codes of many states." Subsequently he joined the faculty of the University of California Hastings College of the Law in San Francisco (as part of its "Sixty-Five Club" of senior faculty retired from elsewhere).

Among his many writings were Free enterprise and economic organization: government regulation with John J. Flynn and Harry First (Foundation Press, 1985), Law enforcement handbook for police with Stephen R. Goldstein (West Pub. Co., 1970), and Free Enterprise and Economic Organization: Concentration and restrictive practices (Foundation Press, 1966).

Schwartz died on January 23, 2003, at 89 years of age in San Francisco, California.
