= Herbert Allan Fogel =

American judge

Judge of the United States District Court for the Eastern District of Pennsylvania
- In office May 15, 1973 – May 1, 1978
- Appointed by: Richard Nixon
- Preceded by: Ralph C. Body
- Succeeded by: James T. Giles

Personal details
- Born: Herbert Allan Fogel; April 20, 1929 Philadelphia, Pennsylvania, U.S.
- Died: September 18, 2002 (aged 73) Hendersonville, Tennessee, U.S.
- Education: University of Pennsylvania (BA, JD)

Herbert Allan Fogel (April 20, 1929 – September 18, 2002) was a United States district judge of the United States District Court for the Eastern District of Pennsylvania.

== Education and career ==
Born on April 20, 1929, in Philadelphia, Pennsylvania, Fogel received a Bachelor of Arts degree from the University of Pennsylvania in 1949 and a Juris Doctor from the University of Pennsylvania Law School in 1952. He was a law clerk for the Court of Common Pleas for Philadelphia County from 1952 to 1954, and a law clerk for Judge Vincent Caroll from 1954 to 1959. Fogel thereafter entered private practice in Philadelphia until 1973, also serving as a deputy state attorney general of the Pennsylvania Harness Racing Commission from 1963 to 1970.

== Federal judicial service ==
On February 13, 1973, Fogel was nominated by President Richard Nixon to a seat on the United States District Court for the Eastern District of Pennsylvania vacated by Judge Ralph C. Body. Fogel was confirmed by the United States Senate on May 14, 1973, and received his commission on May 15, 1973. In 1978, he was investigated about a relative's government contract, during which he invoked the 5th Amendment. He was never convicted but he resigned from the bench on May 1, 1978.

== Later life ==
After resigning from his judgeship, Fogel owned a bar in Roxborough. In 1989, Fogel pleaded guilty to four charges of drunk driving, and was sentenced to spend a year at the Talbott/Marsh Recovery Clinic in Atlanta. Fogel left after only five months, moving to Nashville, Tennessee, where he was eventually jailed as a fugitive and returned to Pennsylvania, to be sentenced to prison. Fogel died on September 18, 2002, in Hendersonville, Tennessee.

== See also ==
- List of Jewish American jurists

== Sources ==
Legal offices
Preceded by Ralph C. Body	Judge of the United States District Court for the Eastern District of Pennsylvania; 1973–1978	Succeeded by James T. Giles
