= RGK =

RGK may refer to:

- RGK Foundation
- RGK Mobile
  - RGK Center for Philanthropy and Community Service
- RGK color space, see RG color space
- Red Wing Regional Airport (FAA Code: RGK)
- Gorno-Altaysk Airport (IATA Code: RGK)
- Romano-Germanic Commission (Römisch-Germanische Kommission), a department of the German Archaeological Institute
- RGK Entertainment Group
  - RGK Records
- RGK Wheelchairs
