= Kroenig =

Kroenig and Kroening are surnames. Notable people include:

- Brad Kroenig (born 1979), American model
- Carl W. Kroening (1928–2017), American educator and politician
- Daniel Kroening (born 1975), German computer scientist
- Matthew Kroenig (born 1977), American professor and foreign policy advisor
