= William Inboden =

American academic, writer, and former White House staffer (born 1972)

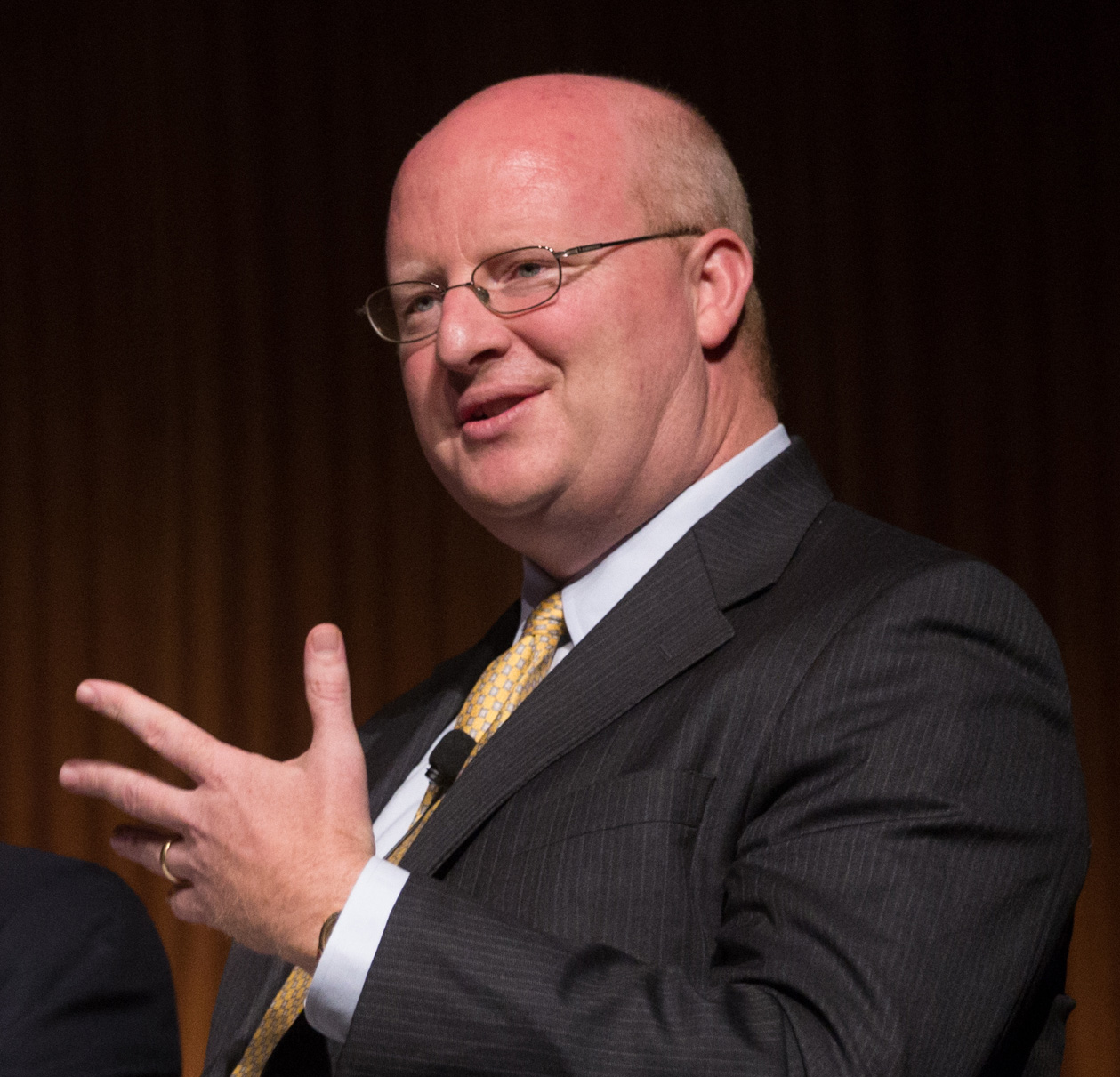
- Born: William Charles Inboden III; November 7, 1972 (age 54)
- Education: Stanford University; Yale University
- Scientific career
- Fields: National security, U.S. foreign policy, religious freedom
- Workplaces: Clements Center for National Security; Lyndon B. Johnson School of Public Affairs; University of Texas at Austin

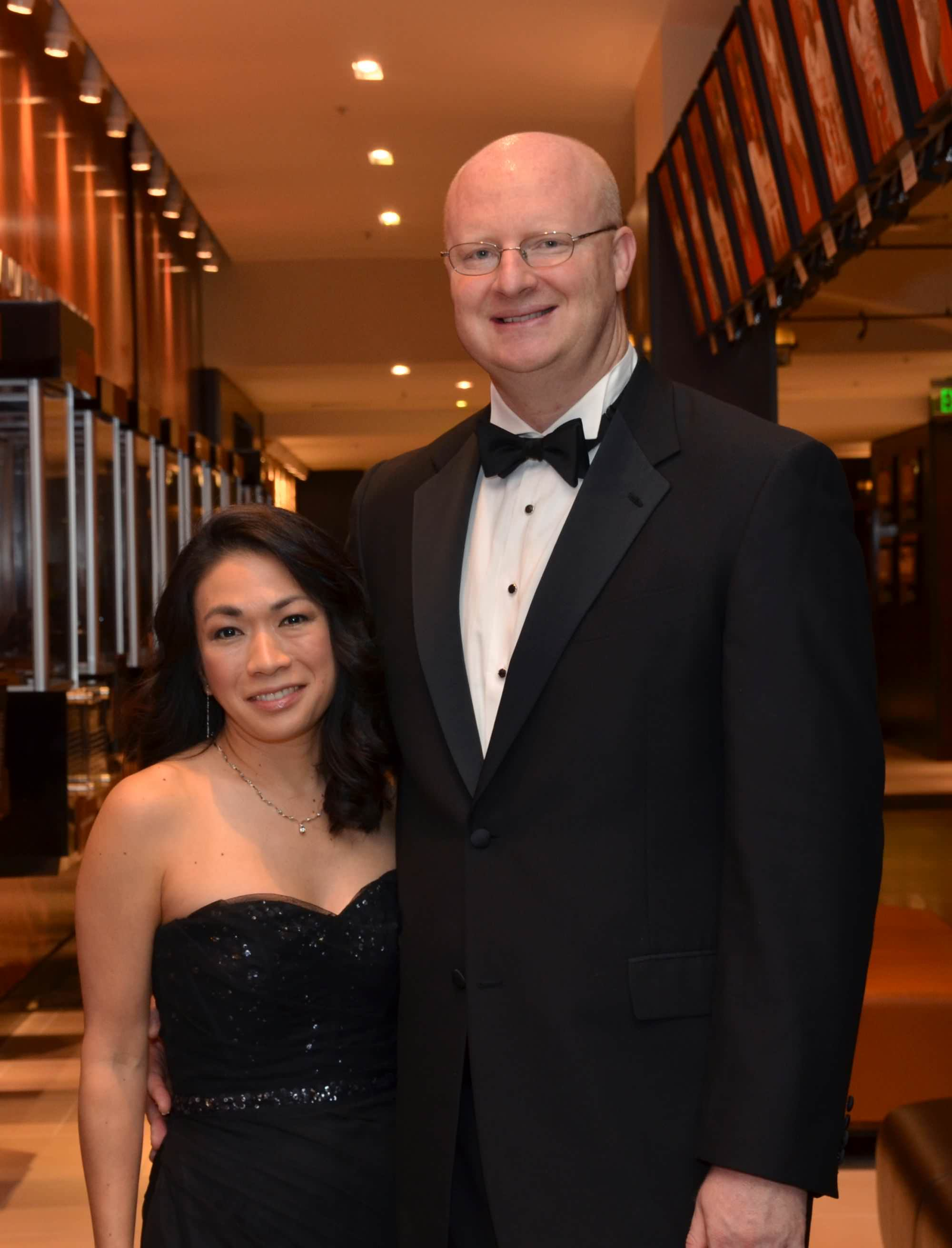
Will and Rana Inboden at the Clements Center's inaugural gala in 2013

William Charles Inboden III (born November 7, 1972) is an American academic, writer, and former White House staffer. Inboden is currently the executive vice president and provost of the University of Texas at Austin and the William Powers Jr. Chair of the Clements Center for National Security at the University of Texas at Austin. He also serves as an associate professor of public affairs at the LBJ School of Public Affairs and Distinguished Scholar at the Robert S. Strauss Center for International Security and Law, as well as a Senior Fellow at the Trinity Forum. On June 12, 2023, Inboden was hired by the University of Florida as the director of the Hamilton Center before returning to UT Austin in August 2025 to serve as the university's chief academic officer.

== Education ==
Will Inboden graduated with an A.B. in history from Stanford University in 1994. During his time at Stanford, Inboden studied abroad at Oxford University's Magdalen College.

After graduation, Inboden worked as a staff member in both the United States Senate and the House of Representatives in the offices of Sam Nunn (D-GA) and Tom DeLay (R-TX). During his time in Congress, Inboden was one of the original "visionaries" of the International Religious Freedom Act of 1998, which obligates Congress and the president "to take into account the various issues of religious freedom while developing the country's foreign policy."

In 1998, Inboden moved to New Haven to pursue a Ph.D. in history at Yale University. During his time at Yale, Inboden was a Civitas Fellow at the American Enterprise Institute in Washington, D.C., from 2001 to 2002. Inboden received his Ph.D. degree in history from Yale University in 2003. His dissertation was entitled "The Soul of American Diplomacy: Religion and Foreign Policy, 1945–1960."

== Professional career ==
Returning to Washington, D.C., Inboden worked at the U.S. Department of State as a member of the Policy Planning Staff and the special advisor in the Office of International Religious Freedom.

From 2005 to 2007, Inboden served as the senior director for Strategic Planning and Institutional Reform at the National Security Council under President George W. Bush. During his time at the White House, he worked on a range of foreign policy issues including the National Security Strategy, democracy and governance, contingency planning, counterradicalization, and multilateral institutions and initiatives.

From 2007 to 2010, Inboden served as the senior vice president and head of the Legatum Institute, a London-based think tank and educational charity, conducting research on issues related to national security, political and economic liberty, and global prosperity.

In 2010, Inboden moved to Austin, Texas to begin teaching at the LBJ School of Public Affairs at the University of Texas as an assistant professor in public affairs. Additionally, in 2010, he joined the Robert S. Strauss Center for International Security and Law at UT-Austin as a distinguished scholar. In 2013, Inboden was promoted to associate professor.

Since 2010, Inboden has taught a wide range of courses, including "Presidential Leadership and Decision Making on National Security," "Intelligence & National Security in American Society" with Professor Stephen Slick, and "Ethics & International Relations." As a professor, Inboden has received numerous teaching awards (including Best New Professor), and his classes have often been selected as the "Best Class in the LBJ School." During his time at UT, Inboden has also served as a non-resident fellow with the German Marshall Fund of the United States, Senior Advisor with Avascent International, and Associate Scholar with Georgetown University's Berkley Center for Religion, Peace, and World Affairs.

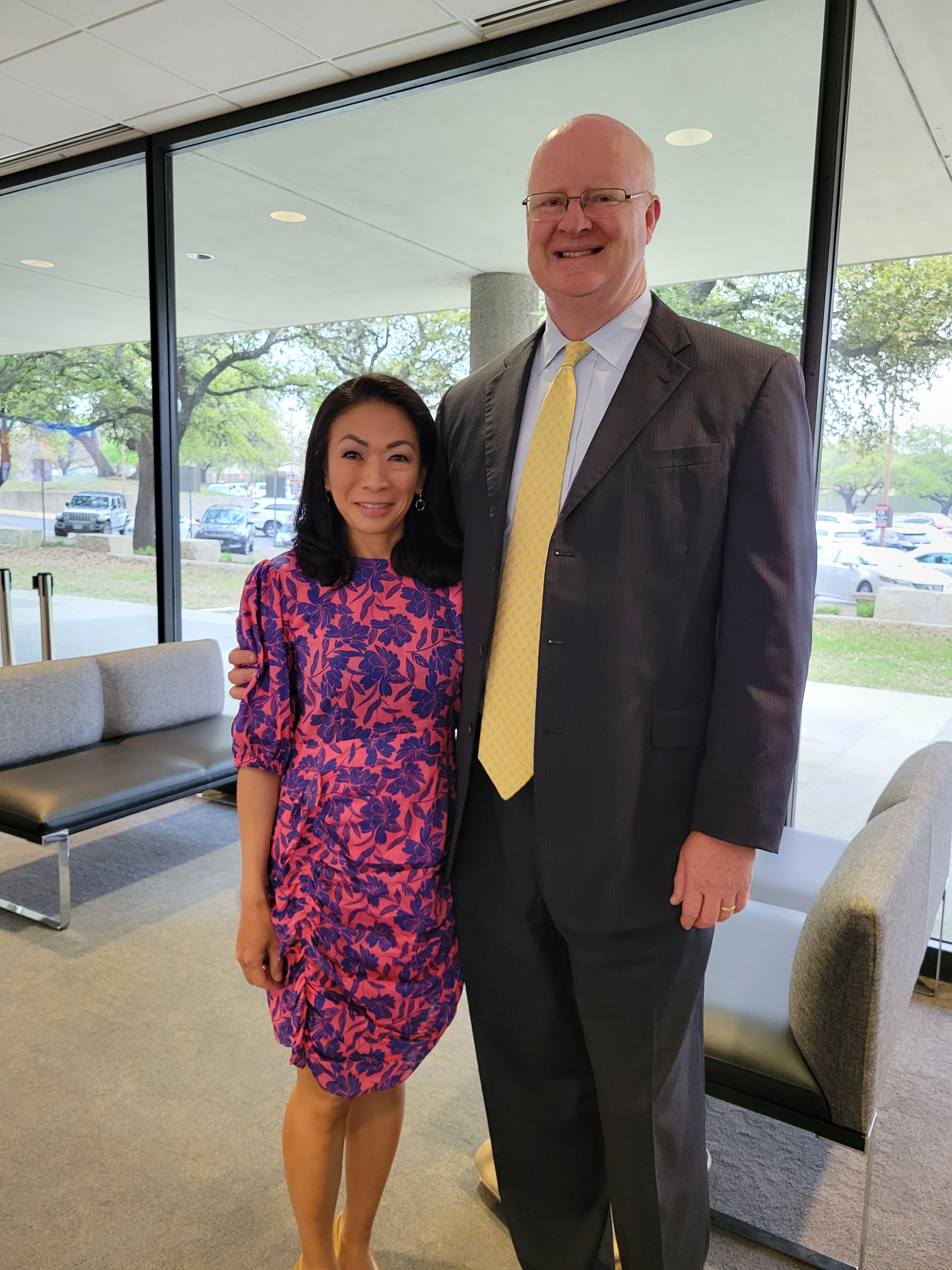
The Inbodens at a LBJ Library event in early 2022

In 2013, Inboden helped to establish the William P. Clements Jr. Center for National Security at UT Austin, where he served as the center's executive director until 2023. The Clements Center, a nonpartisan research and policy center named after former Texas Governor and Deputy Secretary of Defense Bill Clements, aims to "draw on the best insights of diplomatic and military history to train the next generation of national security leaders. Inboden says he was inspired to create a center which would bridge the gap between policymakers and historians during his tenure in the National Security Council, after noticing that nearly every high-level national security official was reading a book on history during a meeting at Camp David.

During the second Trump administration, Inboden, as provost under the leadership of President Jim Davis, led several changes to UT Austin for "efficiency" in response to growing conservative pressure on higher education from the federal and state governments, especially due to the 2025 passage of Texas Senate Bill 37. Inboden had also previously criticized higher education for a lack of "conservative scholars" and a broken "social contract" in an article in conservative magazine National Affairs. These changes have included unilaterally eliminating or consolidating decades-old and nationally renowned departments and programs in ethnic studies, American studies, urban studies, women's and gender studies, French, Italian, Germanic studies, and Slavic studies against said faculty and student input; removing said departments' courses from the core curriculum; consolidating the School of Information under the College of Natural Sciences; closing student and faculty support programs; and creating a plan to update the university's core to focus more on Western civilization and artificial intelligence, decisions which have been decried as "censorship," "viewpoint discrimination," and threats to academic freedom by faculty, staff, students, and alumni.

== Personal life ==
He is married to Dr. Rana Siu Inboden.

== Publications ==
Inboden is a member of the Council on Foreign Relations, a contributing editor to Foreign Policy magazine, and his commentary has appeared in numerous outlets including the Wall Street Journal, New York Times, Washington Post, Los Angeles Times, NPR, Sky News, BBC, and CNN. His newest book is The Peacemaker: Ronald Reagan, the Cold War, and the World on the Brink, a history of Reagan administration national security policy.

=== Books and book chapters ===
- The Last Card: Inside George W. Bush's Decision to Surge in Iraq. Cornell University Press, 2019.
- Religion and American Foreign Policy, 1945-1960: The Soul of Containment, Cambridge University Press, 2008.
- "Reforming American Power: Civilian National Security Institutions in the Early Cold War and Beyond," in Sustainable Security:Rethinking American National Security Strategy, edited by Jeremi Suri and Benjamin Valentino, The Tobin Project, 2016.
- "Grand Strategy and Petty Squabbles: The Paradox and Lessons of the Reagan NSC," In The Power of the Past: History and Statecraft, edited by Hal Brands and Jeremi Suri, 151–80. Brookings Institution Press, 2016.
- "The Irony of a Globalizing Future," in Law and Religion: Historical and Philosophical Perspectives, edited by Gerald Bradley, Cambridge University Press, 2012.

(Co-Author with Peter Feaver: "A Strategic Planning Cell on National Security at the White House," in Avoiding Trivia: The Role of Strategic Planning in American Foreign Policy, edited by Daniel Drezner, Brookings Institution Press, 2009.

- The Peacemaker: Ronald Reagan, the Cold War, and the World on the Brink. Penguin Random House, 2022.

=== Articles ===
- Ronald Reagan, Exemplar of Conservative Internationalism?, Orbis, Volume 62, Issue 1,(2018).
- Wisdom without tears: Statecraft and the uses of history, Journal of Strategic Studies, 41:7, 916-946,(2018).
- "Statecraft, Decision-Making, and the Varieties of Historical Experience: A Taxonomy," Journal of Strategic Studies 36, no. 6 (2013).
- "The Prophetic Conflict: Reinhold Niebuhr, Christian Realism, and World War II," Diplomatic History 37, no.4 (August 2013).
