= Robert Chesney =

Robert Chesney may refer to:

- Bob Chesney (born 1977), American football coach
- Bobby Chesney (born 1971), counter-terrorism expert and law professor at The University of Texas School of Law
- Robert de Chesney, 12th-century Bishop of Lincoln
