= Francis J. Gavin =

American historian (born 1965)

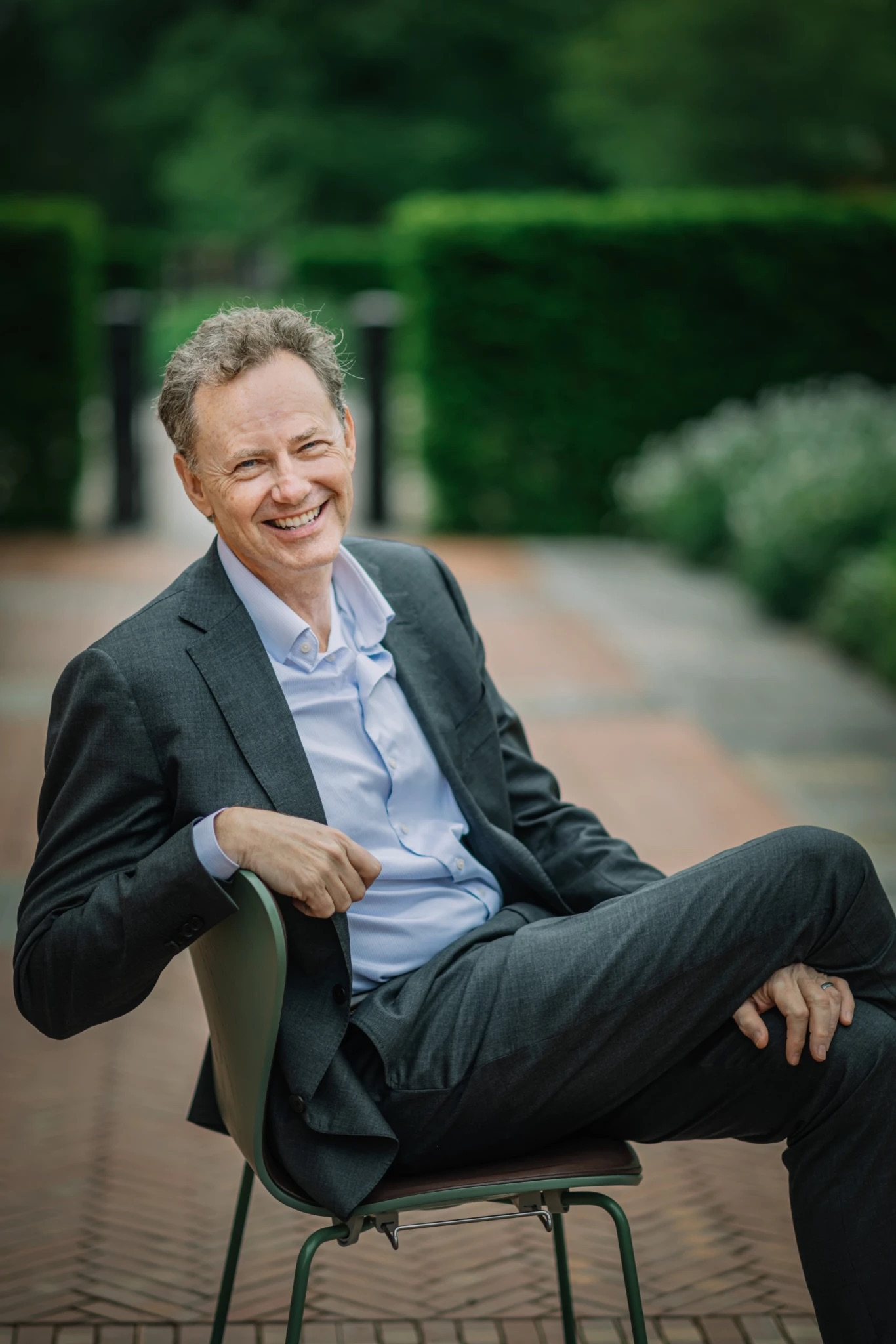
- Gavin in 2024
- Born: Francis J. Gavin

Education
- Education: University of Chicago (B.A.); Oxford University (MSt); University of Pennsylvania (M.A., Ph.D.)

Francis J. Gavin (born December 4, 1965) is an American historian currently serving as the Giovanni Agnelli Distinguished Professor and inaugural Director of the Henry A. Kissinger Center for Global Affairs at Johns Hopkins University School of Advanced International Studies in Washington, D.C. He is also the chairman of the Board of Editors for the Texas National Security Review.

== Career ==
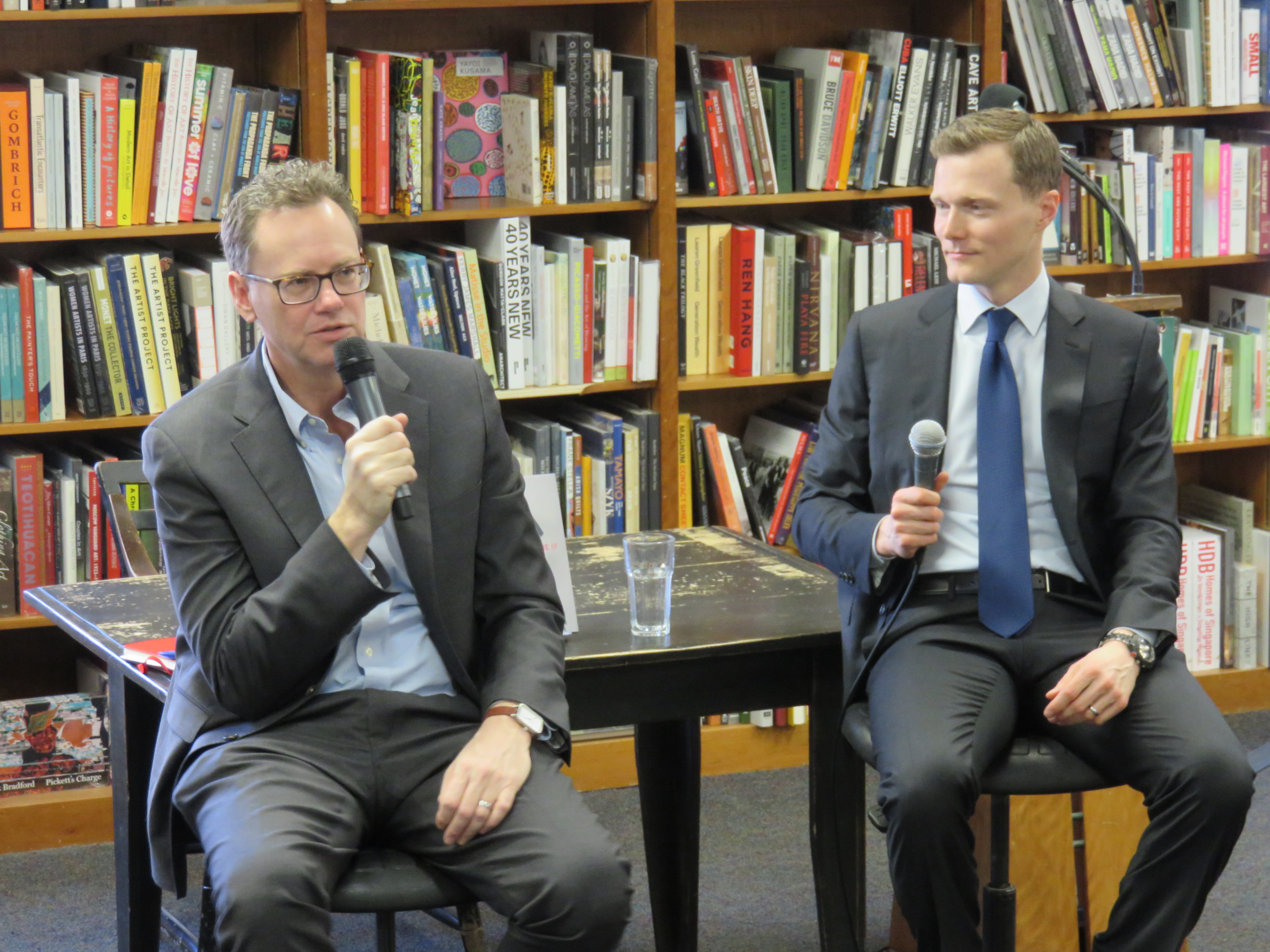
Francis J. Gavin (left) in conversation with Matthew Kroenig (right) about his book, The Logic of American Nuclear Strategy: Why Strategic Superiority Matters, Politics and Prose, Washington, D.C., 10 March 2018

Prior to his tenure at Johns Hopkins SAIS, he was a Professor of Political Science at MIT, where he was selected as the inaugural Frank Stanton Chair in Nuclear Security Policy Studies in 2013. Before joining MIT, he taught at the University of Texas from 2000 to 2013. While there, he was named the Tom Slick Professor of International Affairs at the Lyndon B. Johnson School of Public Affairs in 2005 and served as the Director of the Robert S. Strauss Center for International Security and Law.

He is a Senior Fellow at the Clements Center for National Security at the University of Texas, a Distinguished Scholar at the University of Texas Robert S. Strauss Center for International Security and Law, and an affiliate of the Security Studies Program at MIT. He is the Co-Founder, Co-Director, and Principal Investigator, with James Steinberg, of the Carnegie International Policy Scholars Consortium and Network (IPSCON), and Founder and Director of the Nuclear Studies Research Initiative (NSRI). Gavin currently serves on the CIA Historical Panel and is a lifetime member of the Council on Foreign Relations.

He has been a National Security Fellow at the Olin Institute, Harvard University, an International Security Fellow at the Belfer Center for Science and International Affairs, Harvard University, a Donald Harrington Faculty Fellow at the University of Texas, a Smith Richardson Junior Faculty Fellow, a Senior Research Fellow at the Nobel Institute, Oslo, Norway, a Public Policy School at the Woodrow Wilson Center, and the Ernest May Senior Visiting Professor in Applied History, John F. Kennedy School of Government, Harvard University. From 2005 until 2010, he directed The American Assembly’s multiyear, national initiative, The Next Generation Project: U.S. Global Policy and the Future of International Institutions.

== Education ==
Gavin received his PhD and MA in history from the University of Pennsylvania, a Master of Studies in Modern European History from Oxford University and a BA in Political Science from the University of Chicago.

== Bibliography ==
=== Books ===
- Thinking Historically – A Guide to Statecraft and Strategy (Yale University Press, 2025).
- Wonder and Worry: Contemporary history in an age of uncertainty (Bokforlaget Stolpe, 2025).
- The Taming of Scarcity and the Problems of Plenty: Rethinking International Relations and American Grand Strategy in a New Era (Routledge, 2024).
- COVID-19 and World Order: The Future of Conflict, Competition, and Cooperation (edited with Hal Brands, Johns Hopkins University Press, 2020).
- Nuclear Weapons and American Grand Strategy (Brookings Institution Press, 2020).
- Chaos in the Liberal World Order: The Trump Presidency and International Politics in the Twenty-First Century (edited with Robert Jervis, Joshua Rovner, and Diane Labrosse, Columbia University Press 2018)
- Beyond the Cold War: Lyndon Johnson and the New Global Challenges of the 1960s (edited with Mark Lawrence, Oxford University Press, 2014).
- Nuclear Statecraft: History and Strategy in America's Atomic Age (Cornell University Press, 2012).
- Gold, Dollars, and Power: The Politics of International Monetary Relations, 1958-1971 (University of North Carolina Press, 2007).

=== Articles ===
- Recent articles can be found on Gavin's website.
- “Power, Politics, and U.S. Policy in Iran, 1950-1953.” Journal of Cold War Studies, Winter 1999: 58-89
- “The Legends of Bretton Woods,” Orbis, Spring 1996, pp. 183–199
- “The Myth of Flexible Response: American Strategy in Europe during the 1960s,” International History Review, December 2001: 847-875
- “The Gold Battles within the Cold War: American Monetary Policy and the Defense of Europe, 1960-1963,” Diplomatic History, Winter 2002: 61-94
- “Blasts from the Past: Nuclear Proliferation and Rogue States Before the Bush Doctrine,” International Security, Winter 2005, pp. 100–135
- “History and Policy,” International Journal, Winter 2008
- “Same as it ever was: Nuclear Alarmism, Proliferation, and the Cold War,” International Security, Winter 2010, pp. 7–37
- Gavin, Francis J. & James B. Steinberg (Spring 2012). "Mind the gap : why policymakers and scholars ignore each other, and what should be done about it" (PDF). Carnegie Reporter. 6 (4): 10–17.
- “Politics, History and the Ivory Tower-Policy Gap in the Nuclear Proliferation Debate,” Journal of Strategic Studies, August 2012, pp. 573–600
- “History, Security Studies, and the July Crisis,” Journal of Strategic Studies, Volume 37, Issue 2, 2014, pp. 319–331
- “What If? The Historian and the Counterfactual,” Security Studies, Volume 24, Issue 3, 2015
- “Strategies of Inhibition: U.S. Grand Strategy, the Nuclear Revolution, and Nonproliferation,” International Security vol. 40, No. 1, summer 2015, Pages 9–46
- "Rethinking the Bomb: Nuclear Weapons and American Grand Strategy,” Texas National Security Review, vol. 2, no. 1, winter 2019
