= Paul D. Miller =

Paul D. Miller may refer to:

- DJ Spooky (born 1970), African-American hip-hop artist
- Paul David Miller (born 1941), United States Navy admiral
- Paul D. Miller (academic), American academic, blogger, and US government official
