= Jean Westwood =

Jean Westwood may refer to:

- Jean Westwood (politician) (1923–1997), political figure Utah
- Jean Westwood (figure skater) (1931–2022), British ice dancer and coach
