= UChannel =

Educational organizations based in the United States

UChannel is a consortium of universities that makes public affairs lectures available to a general audience by distributing free video and audio recordings in many digital formats – for streaming, downloading and broadcast. It was originally launched as the University Channel.

== Origins ==
UChannel charter members are:

- Princeton University's Woodrow Wilson School of Public and International Affairs
- the School of International and Public Affairs at Columbia University
- Middlebury College's Rohatyn Center for International Affairs
- the Lyndon B. Johnson School of Public Affairs at the University of Texas at Austin

The project was incubated at Princeton University's Woodrow Wilson School of Public and International Affairs and launched its website in July 2005.

== Content ==
The collection includes events from dozens of universities around the world, all dealing with issues of public interest such as war, health, media, economy and global developments. Speakers come from the ranks of academics, authors and policymakers, and their presentations are offered to the public uncut and unedited.

UChannel's focus is on public and international affairs because, as UChannel's Executive Director Donna Liu explains, "that is where the public stands to benefit the most from having access to the kind of well-researched, dispassionate, reasoned analysis that academia can provide". The content consists largely of unedited, full-length lectures, events and conferences that take place in academia.

== Access ==
Individuals may access the material directly from the UChannel website or via subscription to podcasts via RSS.

Programming is also made available to a variety of TV distributors, including IPTV (Campus Consortium's (previously CampusEAI) Open Student Television Network (OSTN)), cable TV video-on-demand and some of the Public, educational, and government access (PEG) cable TV member stations belonging to the Alliance for Community Media (ACM).
