= James Steinberg =

American academic administrator and diplomat (born 1953)

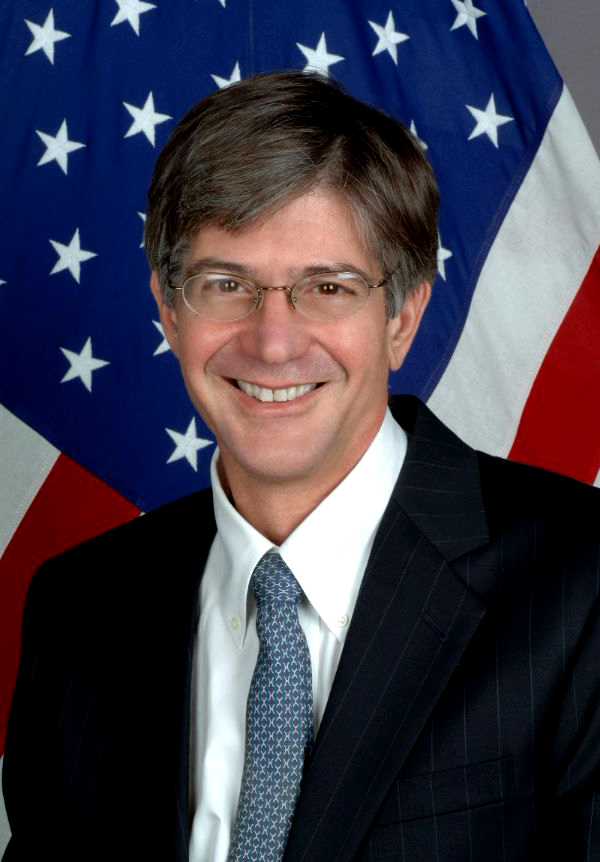
- Official portrait, 2021

10th Dean of the Paul H. Nitze School of Advanced International Studies
- Incumbent
- Assumed office November 1, 2021
- Preceded by: Eliot Cohen

16th United States Deputy Secretary of State
- In office January 28, 2009 – July 28, 2011
- President: Barack Obama
- Preceded by: John Negroponte
- Succeeded by: William J. Burns

20th United States Deputy National Security Advisor
- In office December 23, 1996 – August 1, 2000
- President: Bill Clinton
- Preceded by: Sandy Berger
- Succeeded by: Stephen Hadley

18th Director of Policy Planning
- In office March 21, 1994 – December 23, 1996
- President: Bill Clinton
- Preceded by: Samuel W. Lewis
- Succeeded by: Gregory B. Craig

Personal details
- Born: James Braidy Steinberg; May 7, 1953 (age 73) Boston, Massachusetts, U.S.
- Party: Democratic
- Spouse: Sherburne Abbott
- Children: 2
- Education: Harvard University (BA); Yale University (JD)

James Braidy Steinberg (born May 7, 1953) is an American academic administrator and former diplomat, who served as the 16th United States deputy secretary of state during the Obama administration. He has been the dean of the Paul H. Nitze School of Advanced International Studies (SAIS) at Johns Hopkins University since November 1, 2021. Previously he was a professor at the Maxwell School of Citizenship and Public Affairs at Syracuse University.

== Biography ==
=== Early career ===
Steinberg was born to a Jewish family in Boston, Massachusetts. He was educated at Phillips Academy (1970), Harvard College (1973), and Yale Law School (1978). His previous positions included a senior fellowship for US Strategic Policy at the International Institute for Strategic Studies in London, UK (1985–1987), and senior analyst at RAND Corporation (1989–1993). Steinberg also served as a Senior Advisor to the Markle Foundation (2000–2001) and was a member of the Markle Task Force on National Security in the Information Age.

=== Early campaign work ===
During the national elections which brought President Jimmy Carter into office, Steinberg worked on the presidential campaign of the Carter-Mondale ticket. He also worked as a foreign policy advisor for Michael Dukakis's 1988 campaign.

=== Clinton administration ===
Steinberg served as the U.S. State Department's director of policy planning (1994–1996), then as deputy national security advisor (December 1996–2001) to President Bill Clinton. He also served on the Project on National Security Reform's Guiding Coalition.

=== Brookings Institution director and Lyndon B. Johnson School dean ===
After serving in the Clinton administration, Steinberg was a senior fellow at the Brookings Institution in Washington, D.C., and the institution's vice president and director of foreign policy studies (2001–2005). Steinberg was then dean of the Lyndon B. Johnson School of Public Affairs at the University of Texas at Austin (2006–2009) until his appointment as deputy secretary of state on January 28, 2009, taking a leave of absence from the school for the duration of his term in office.

=== Obama administration ===
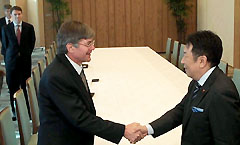
With Yukio Edano (January 27, 2011)

According to The Wall Street Journal, Steinberg, along with Daniel C. Kurtzer and Dennis Ross, were among the principal authors of Barack Obama’s address on the Middle East to AIPAC in June 2008, which was viewed as the Democratic Party nominee’s most expansive on international affairs.

He was mentioned as being "at the top" of Obama's list of candidates for the post of national security advisor, but Andrea Mitchell reported on November 24, 2008, that Hillary Clinton would appoint Steinberg deputy secretary of state. On December 23, 2008, Steinberg himself confirmed the appointment in a letter addressed to students and faculty at the Johnson School.

As deputy secretary of state and principal deputy to secretary of state Hillary Clinton, Steinberg notably coined the phrase "strategic reassurance" to describe China–United States relations suggestive of the idea that the United States should reassure China about welcoming China's rise while China would reassure the US and its neighbors that it would not conflict with their interests.

In October 2010, Steinberg met with Israel’s deputy foreign minister, Danny Ayalon, in Washington, D.C., where they discussed how to improve regional security and stability through boosting and growing the already strong cooperation between their two nations. During the talks, both delegates expressed their commitment to a lasting peace between Israel and its neighbors and their grave concern regarding Iran’s continued non-compliance with its international obligations through pursuit of a military nuclear program.

The following spring, they met in Jerusalem where they again took advantage of the opportunity to work together to identify and strategize against the threats both countries face including the rapidly changing political situation in the Middle East and the ongoing Iranian nuclear program.

=== Post-Obama administration ===
In March 2011, Steinberg was named dean of the Maxwell School of Citizenship and Public Affairs at Syracuse University. On July 28, 2011, he resigned as deputy secretary of state and assumed his new position. His term as dean ended in 2016.

In November 2021, Steinberg was named the tenth dean of Johns Hopkins SAIS.

Steinberg is a member of the Council on Foreign Relations. He also serves as senior counselor at Albright Stonebridge Group.

On January 14, 2024, a U.S. delegation composed of Steinberg and Stephen J. Hadley arrived in Taipei in the aftermath of Taiwan's 2024 presidential election.

== Publications ==
=== Articles ===
- The Perils of Estrangement (in What Does America Want From China?), Foreign Affairs, May 30, 2024 (co-authored with Jessica Chen Weiss)

== Personal life ==
He is married to Sherburne B. Abbott, a research professor at The Johns Hopkins University Whiting School of Engineering and formerly vice president for sustainability initiatives and University Professor of Sustainability Science and Policy at Syracuse University. They have two daughters, Jenna and Emma.

== Bibliography ==
- Gavin, Francis J. & James B. Steinberg (Spring 2012). "Mind the gap : why policymakers and scholars ignore each other, and what should be done about it" (PDF). Carnegie Reporter. 6 (4): 10–17.
- Steinberg, James B. (July 2012). "2012—a watershed year for East Asia?". Roundtable: Turning to the Pacific : U.S. Strategic Rebalancing toward Asia. Asia Policy. 14: 22–25. doi:10.1353/asp.2012.0022. S2CID 140555459.

Political offices
Preceded by Samuel W. Lewis	Director of Policy Planning; 1994–1996	Succeeded by Gregory B. Craig
Preceded by Sandy Berger	Deputy National Security Advisor; 1997–2000	Succeeded by Stephen Hadley
Preceded by John Negroponte	United States Deputy Secretary of State; 2009–2011	Succeeded by William J. Burns
