= Paul D. Miller (academic) =

American academic and writer

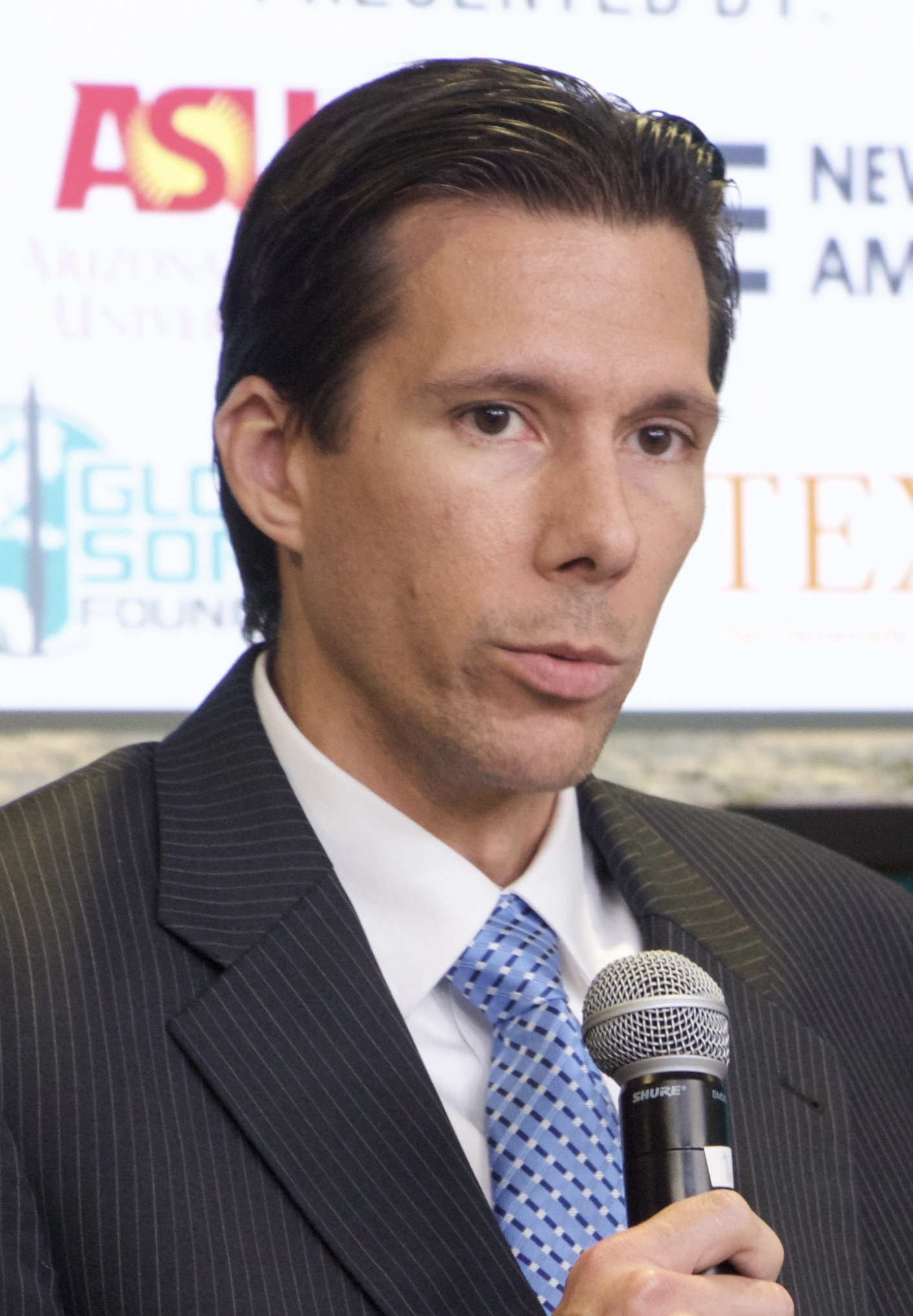
- Miller in 2017
- Education: Georgetown University (BA, PhD); Harvard Kennedy School (MPP)
- Scientific career
- Fields: Politics, national security, Afghanistan
- Institutions: Georgetown University, The William P. Clements Jr. Center for National Security, and University of Texas at Austin
- Military career
- Branch: U.S. Army Reserve
- Conflicts: War in Afghanistan

Paul D. Miller is an American academic, writer, and former White House staffer for Presidents George W. Bush and Barack Obama. He is a professor in the Practice of International Affairs at Georgetown University's School of Foreign Service. He is a former associate director of The William P. Clements Jr. Center for National Security at the University of Texas at Austin. He formerly worked as an adjunct political scientist at the RAND Corporation. He is a reserve Army officer and veteran of the War in Afghanistan. Miller's writing has appeared in Foreign Affairs, The Washington Post, The American Interest, World Affairs, The Washington Quarterly, War on the Rocks, and elsewhere.

== Education ==
Dr. Miller received his PhD in International Relations from Georgetown University and a Masters in Public Policy from Harvard University's John F. Kennedy School of Government. His BA in Political Theory is also from Georgetown University.

== Career ==
Dr. Miller served as Director for Afghanistan on the National Security Council staff from September 2007 to September 2009 under Presidents George W. Bush and Barack Obama. Miller served on the staff of Douglas Lute, who served as Assistant to the President and Deputy National Security Advisor for Iraq and Afghanistan for President Bush and, subsequently, as Special Coordinator for Afghanistan and Pakistan for President Obama. Miller supported the presidential transition and continued in his position during the Obama Administration before accepting a position as assistant professor of International Security Affairs at the National Defense University in Washington, D.C.

=== Views on Afghanistan ===
Miller writes regularly about U.S. policy towards Afghanistan, Pakistan, and South Asia. He has argued that "The greatest threat to long-term success in Afghanistan is not the Taliban, who are fairly weak compared to other insurgent movements around the world. It is the Afghan government’s endemic weakness and the international community’s failure to address it." Miller's proposed solution is greater attention to reconstruction and stabilization in Afghanistan. He has criticized the views of conservatives, like George Will, as well as moderates and liberals, like David Rothkopf, who argue the war effort in Afghanistan is unwinnable for the U.S.

== Publications ==
=== Books ===
- "The Religion of American Greatness: What’s Wrong with Christian Nationalism", Inter Varsity Press Academic, 2022
- American Power and Liberal Order: A Conservative Internationalist Grand Strategy, Georgetown University Press, 2016
- Armed State Building: Confronting State Failure, 1898 - 2012, Cornell University Press, 2013
- Necessary War: What America Needs to Know About the War in Afghanistan, The Cicero Press, 2012
