= Nancy La Vigne =

Criminal justice researcher and director

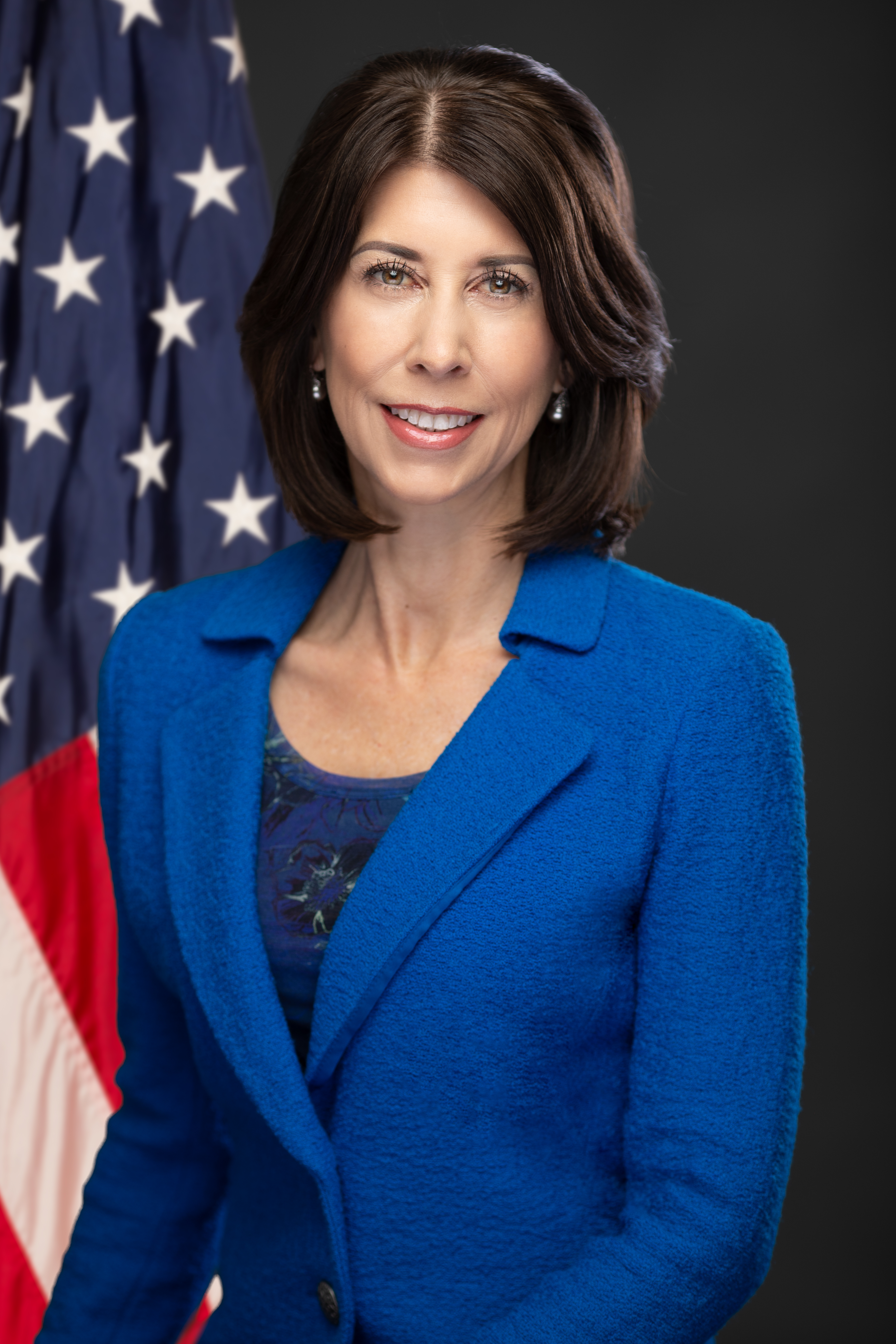

Dean of the Rutgers School of Criminal Justice
- Incumbent
- Assumed office January 2025

Personal details
- Education: Smith College (BA); University of Texas at Austin (MPA); Rutgers University (PhD)
- Occupation: Criminologist

Nancy La Vigne is a criminologist who is the Dean of the Rutgers School of Criminal Justice. She previously served as the director of the National Institute of Justice of the United States, and as the vice president for Justice Policy, directing the Justice Policy Center at the Urban Institute, a Washington, D.C.–based think tank. Her work focuses on data-driven and research-informed improvements to policy and practice on a wide array of criminal justice topics and justice-involved populations.

La Vigne was honored with the Distinguished Public Service Award from the LBJ School of Public Affairs in 2018, and in 2017, she received the Herbert Block Award, given by the American Society of Criminology. In 2024, she delivered the Mastrofski Lecture at George Mason University's departments of criminology and law and society. La Vigne is the Dean of Rutgers University's School of Criminal Justice.

== Education ==
La Vigne received her B.A. in government and economics at Smith College in 1987. In 1991, she received her M.P.A. at the LBJ School of Public Affairs at the University of Texas at Austin. In 1996, she received her Ph.D. in criminal justice at Rutgers, The State University of New Jersey.

== Career ==
La Vigne's research focus includes policing reform, federal corrections reform, reentry from prison, and evidence-based criminal justice practices

She was appointed by President Biden on March 28, 2022, to lead the National Institute of Justice, the U.S. Department of Justice’s research, technology, and evaluation arm. She served until January 2025. The institute covers policing, forensics, corrections, victimization, violence reduction, juvenile justice, and criminal justice technologies.

In 2023, she emphasized importance of evidence-based strategies for successful reentry. This strategy emphasizes the need for tailored and holistic support that starts during confinement and continues after release, with a focus on family involvement, cognitive-behavioral therapy, and community supervision.

At a panel discussion at the University of Tennessee-Knoxville, La Vigne conveyed her commitment to advancing the field's methodologies, bolstering evidence in court proceedings, aiding in the resolution of missing person cases, enhancing public safety, and fostering a more equitable justice system.

During La Vigne's tenure as executive director of the Council on Criminal Justice's (CCJ) Task Force on Policing, the CCJ reported a few expected impacts of body-worn cameras: preventing misuse of force, enhancing transparency and accountability, and strengthening community trust.

While serving as director of the Justice Policy Center at the Urban Institute, La Vigne authored a study about crime in and around Washington, D.C. metro transit stations, showing that different characteristics of a station are significant correlates for particular crime outcomes such as disorderly conduct, robbery, and larceny.

One point of advocacy for La Vigne at the Urban Institute was to bring about a more dignified set of terms to describe people with varying interaction with the criminal justice system. She outlined four best practices for encouraging inclusive terminology: be aware, reduce stigma, consider the whole person, and respect preference.

From 2014 to 2016, La Vigne served as the director of the Charles Colson Task Force on Federal Corrections Reform. La Vigne also serves as a regular featured speaker at MPD's DC Police Leadership Academy.

== Professional service ==
Between 2014 and 2017 as well as 2020 and 2022, La Vigne served as director of the governing board of the Consortium of Social Science Associations. Also from 2020 to 2022, she served on the board of trustees for the Pretrial Justice Institute.

La Vigne served as associate editor for the Prison Journal, Security Journal, and the Journal of Offender Rehabilitation.

She served as advisory board member for the Allegheny County Jail Collaborative Study from 2004 to 2007, and from 2004 to 2005, she served as advisory board member for the Institute for Higher Education Policy’s Prisoner Access to Postsecondary Education Study, 2004 – 2005.
