= Stephen Slick =

Former Central Intelligence Agency (CIA) Operation Officer in United States

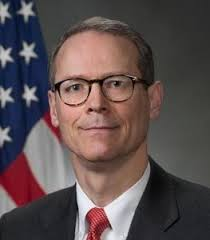
- Born: Stephen Brent Slick
- Occupation: Director of Intelligence Studies Project at the University of Texas at Austin
- Years active: 2015–

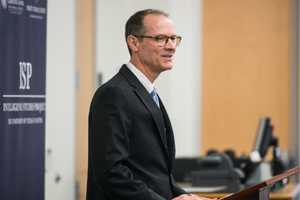
Stephen Slick is the Director of the Intelligence Studies Project at the University of Texas at Austin

Stephen Brent Slick is a former Central Intelligence Agency (CIA) operations officer and United States National Security Council official. He is the inaugural director of the Intelligence Studies Project at the University of Texas at Austin, where he is also a Clinical Professor at the Lyndon B. Johnson School of Public Affairs and the Bobby R. Inman Chair in Intelligence Studies.

During his career in the CIA's Clandestine Service, he completed five overseas tours, including two as chief of station and senior intelligence community representative. He also played key roles in developing the provisions of the Intelligence Reform and Terrorism Prevention Act of 2004 and amendments to Executive Order 12333, issued by President Bush in 2008.

== Education and early career ==
Slick holds a Bachelor of Arts degree (B.A.) (with high honors) in political science from the Pennsylvania State University, where he was elected to Phi Beta Kappa. He earned a Juris Doctor (J.D.) from the UCLA School of Law, where he was a member of Law Review. He also received a Master's Degree in Public Policy from Princeton University’s Woodrow Wilson School of Public and International Affairs while studying on a John L. Weinberg fellowship.

From 1983–1986, Slick was a litigation associate at the Rawle and Henderson law firm in Philadelphia, Pennsylvania.

Slick joined the CIA in 1986. After completing basic espionage tradecraft and foreign language training, Slick was assigned under official cover overseas as an operations officer in Eastern Europe, South Asia, and as Deputy Chief of Station in Eurasia. From 1996–1998, he was assigned to CIA Headquarters, where he directed the CIA's training and tradecraft development for operations in complex security and counterintelligence environments.

Slick was awarded CIA's Commendation Medal, Medal of Merit, and the National Intelligence Superior Service Medal, and other awards from the CIA, the Department of State, and foreign governments. In 2018, he was recognized as Penn State's Outstanding Political Science Alumnus by the Department's Board of Visitors.

== Career ==
After serving as Chief of Station in Budapest, Hungary from 1998–2000, Slick returned to Langley to lead the CIA's Balkan Operations. He then became an Executive Assistant to Deputy Director of Central Intelligence John McLaughlin. In 2004, he moved to the National Security Council (NSC) as Director for Intelligence Programs. In 2005, Slick was appointed Special Assistant to the President and NSC Senior Director for Intelligence Programs and Reform. In this latter position, he was an advisor on intelligence matters to the President and the assistants to the President for national security affairs, homeland security, and counterterrorism.

At the NSC, Slick chaired the Policy Coordination Committee on Intelligence Programs, leading administrative and interagency reviews of ongoing and proposed covert action programs and sensitive intelligence collection activities. Slick was part of a team led by NSC Counsel John Bellinger and Senior Director for Intelligence Programs David Shedd that supported the development of an administration response to recommendations for government reform put forward by the 9/11 Commission. The team also lobbied for what would ultimately be enacted as the Intelligence Reform and Terrorism Prevention Act of 2004 (IRTPA). Slick led an NSC staff review of recommendations by the Silberman-Robb Commission regarding intelligence failures in connection with pre-war assessments of Iraq's weapons of mass destruction. During his White House assignment, Slick advocated for strong central leadership of the Intelligence Community while preserving the CIA's traditional roles in human intelligence, coordinating intelligence activities overseas, and conducting covert action directed by the President and supervised by the NSC.

During President Bush's second term, Slick supported calls by Director of National Intelligence Mike McConnell and the President's Intelligence Advisory Board to revise Executive Order 12333. The Order, originally issued by President Ronald Reagan in 1981, served as the “charter” for U.S. intelligence. Many of its terms became obsolete on passage of the IRTPA. Slick led the year-long process of interagency coordination of a revised Executive Order 12333, which President Bush signed in July 2008.

After assisting with the transition of intelligence activities to the Obama administration, Slick returned to the CIA in early 2009. Prior to retiring in 2014, Slick completed a four-year assignment as Chief of Station and the Director of National Intelligence’s Representative to Israel.

In January 2015, Slick was named the first Director of the Intelligence Studies Project, sponsored jointly by the Robert S. Strauss Center for International Security and Law and the Clements Center for National Security at the University of Texas at Austin. He was appointed as a Clinical Professor at the University's Lyndon B. Johnson School of Public Affairs at the same time. Slick is Fellow to the Bobby R. Inman Chair in Intelligence Studies.

In August 2016, Slick was among 50 senior Republican national security officials who signed a letter declaring that Donald Trump “lacks the character, values and experience” to be president and “would put at risk our country’s national security and well-being.” He also joined the larger group of Former Republican National Security Officials in an August 2020 statement declaring President Trump “dangerously unfit” and lacking the “character and competence” to hold the office. The same group expressed confidence that Joe Biden would “restore the dignity of the presidency” and “reassert America’s role as a global leader.”

In 2020, Slick, along with over 130 other former Republican national security officials, signed a statement that asserted that President Trump was unfit to serve another term, and "To that end, we are firmly convinced that it is in the best interest of our nation that Vice President Joe Biden be elected as the next President of the United States, and we will vote for him."

Slick was part of a group of former intelligence officials that signed a letter that stated the Biden laptop story “has the classic earmarks of a Russian information operation". It was in fact revealed the laptop contained no evidence of Russian disinformation, and portions of its contents have been verified as authentic.
