= Robert S. Strauss Center for International Security and Law =

International affairs school of the University of Texas at Austin

Coordinates: 30.285688°N 97.728429°W

Robert Strauss Center for International Security and Law
- Established: 2007
- Affiliations: The University of Texas at Austin
- Director: Adam Klein
- Location: Austin, Texas, United States
- Website: strausscenter.org

The Robert Strauss Center for International Security and Law is a nonpartisan, multidisciplinary global affairs research center at The University of Texas at Austin. The center is named for renowned lawyer and public servant Ambassador Robert S. Strauss. The Strauss Center was previously led by Robert M. Chesney until 2022, when Adam Klein, former chairman of the United States Privacy and Civil Liberties Oversight Board, became director.

== Purpose and activities ==
The Robert Strauss Center for International Security and Law integrates expertise from across the University of Texas, as well as from the private and public sectors, in pursuit of practical solutions to emerging international challenges. The center sponsors a wide array of research programs and educational initiatives.

== Programs ==
The Strauss Center supports independent research conducted by graduate students on projects related to international relations and offers several in-house research programs. The research programs focus on political instability, international security, and political violence.

== Strauss Center events ==
The Robert Strauss Center for International Security and Law hosts a variety of events on pressing international issues facing the United States and the rest of the world. These events bring together scholars, students, and practitioners to share expertise and debate ideas. The Strauss Center encourages free and open exchange of ideas and welcomes speakers representing a wide array of views to discuss critical issues impacting international security.

== Leadership ==
- Adam Klein, Director
- Robert M. Chesney, Cybersecurity Program Lead and Dean of the School of Law
- Stephen Slick, Intelligence Studies Project Director
- William Inboden, Associate Professor of Public Affairs and Executive Director of the Clements Center for National Security
- Catherine Weaver, Associate Professor of Public Affairs
- Jeremi Suri, The Mack Brown Distinguished Chair for Leadership in Global Affairs

=== Distinguished Scholars ===
- David Adelman, Harry M. Reasoner Regents Chair in Law
- H.W. Brands, Dickson Allen Anderson Centennial Professor of History
- Gregory W. Engle
- Francis Gavin, Frank Stanton Chair in Nuclear Policy
- Derek Jinks, Marrs McLean Professor in Law
- Vijay Mahajan, John P. Harbin Centennial Chair in Business
- Michael Webber, Associate Professor of Mechanical Engineering
- Moriba Jah, Associate Professor of Aerospace Engineering & Engineering Mechanics; Director of Computational Astronautical Sciences and Technologies, Institute for Computational Engineering and Sciences
