= Clements Center for National Security =

Research center at the University of Texas at Austin

- Named after: Bill Clements
- Established: 2013
- Purpose: Nonpartisan Research and Policy Center
- Executive Director: Paul Edgar
- Key people: Paul Edgar, Stephen Slick, Mark Lawrence, Robert M. Chesney, William Inboden
- Website: https://www.clementscenter.org/

The William P. Clements Jr. Center for National Security is a nonpartisan policy and research center at the University of Texas at Austin. The center is named after former Texas Governor and Deputy Secretary of Defense Bill Clements. The goal of the Clements Center is to teach diplomatic and military history to undergraduates and graduate students, as well as support research in the topics of history, strategy, and national security policy.

== History ==
The Clements Center was founded in 2013. The Clements family donated $2.5 million to start it in 2013.

In August 2025, the William l. Clements Foundation gave $10 million as a gift to support to the Clements Center for National Security, to support renovating an auditorium and support student programs. Joseph Maguire was executive director for the Clements Center.

In 2025, the Daily Texan reported that the Clements Center for National Security was a collaboration with the Texas Military Department. That year, the Texas senate passed a spending bill allocating $12 million for the Clements Center.

In September 2026, the university created the new degree program Strategy and Statecraft as a major, as a collaboration between the Clements Center and the School of Civic Leadership.

== Leadership ==
Leadership:

- Paul Edgar, Executive Director
- Angelica Martinez, Senior Associate Director
- Mark Lawrence, Director of Graduate Programs
- Alexandra Sukalo, Intelligence Studies Project Director
- Joseph Maguire, Distinguished National Security Fellow
- Robert Neller, Distinguished National Security Fellow
- Vincent K. Brooks, Distinguished National Security Fellow
- Jeannie Leavitt, Distinguished National Security Fellow
- Ellen McCarthy, Distinguished National Security Fellow
- Steve Slick, Senior Intelligence Studies Project Fellow
- Robert D. Kaplan, Distinguished Senior Lecturer
