= Brad Kroenig =

American fashion model

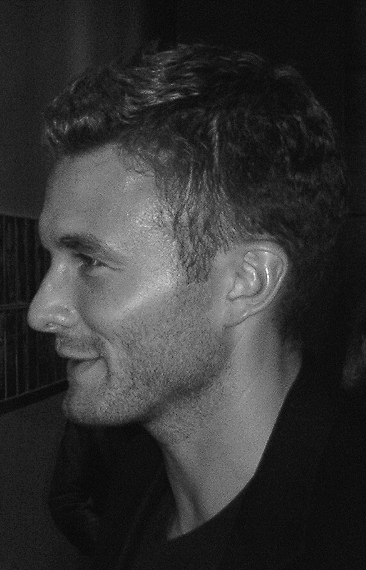
- Born: April 23, 1979 (age 47); St. Louis, Missouri, United States
- Spouse: Nicole Kroenig
- Children: 2
- Relatives: Matthew Kroenig (brother)
- Modeling information
- Hair color: Dark blonde
- Eye color: Green
- Agency: d'management Group (Milan); Sight Management Studio (Barcelona); SPIN Model Management (Hamburg); Ford Models (Chicago, New York) (mother agency)

Brad Kroenig (born April 23, 1979), is a former American fashion model.

== Career ==
Brad Kroenig was raised in Oakville, Missouri. His father was an environmental engineer and his mother a legal assistant. He studied at Florida International University with a soccer scholarship. He dropped out to become a model. His first major cast was nude shots for Abercrombie & Fitch. He moved to New York in 2001 and signed a three-year contract with the Ford model agency.

Kroenig started his modeling career in 2002 with a longstanding collaboration with fashion designer Karl Lagerfeld. Considered one of "Karl's Boys," he followed the designer to business trips, parties and holidays, and was sometimes mistakenly identified as his boyfriend by gossip blogs. Kroenig met Lagerfeld in 2003 during a photo shooting at Lagerfeld's villa in Biarritz in France. Lagerfeld's 2007 book Metamorphoses of an American is entirely devoted to Brad Kroenig.

In 2002, he worked alongside Naomi Campbell. He has graced numerous magazine covers including VMAN, Vogue, Numéro Homme and Allure. Kroenig has appeared in print campaigns for designers including Chanel, Fendi, Dolce & Gabbana, Abercrombie & Fitch, Roberto Cavalli, DKNY, Gap and Adidas, and on the runway for Chanel and Michael Kors.

Kroenig is now a realtor with his wife in Florida. Prior to this, he worked as a realtor under the Corcoran Group in New York.

== Private life ==
Brad Kroenig is married to Nicole Kroenig, the daughter of the tennis player Nick Bollettieri. He has two sons. His son Hudson is Karl Lagerfeld's godson, and has been appearing on Chanel's runway since he was two years old.

Kroenig lives with his family in Lakewood Ranch, Florida.

== Honors ==
- 2005: Top Male Model by Models.com
- 2015: Top 10 Male Models of All Time by Vogue

== Biography ==
- Karl Lagerfeld, Metamorphoses of an American, Steidl, 2007 (ISBN 978-3865215222)
