= Matthew Kroenig =

American professor, foreign policy advisor, and former CIA officer

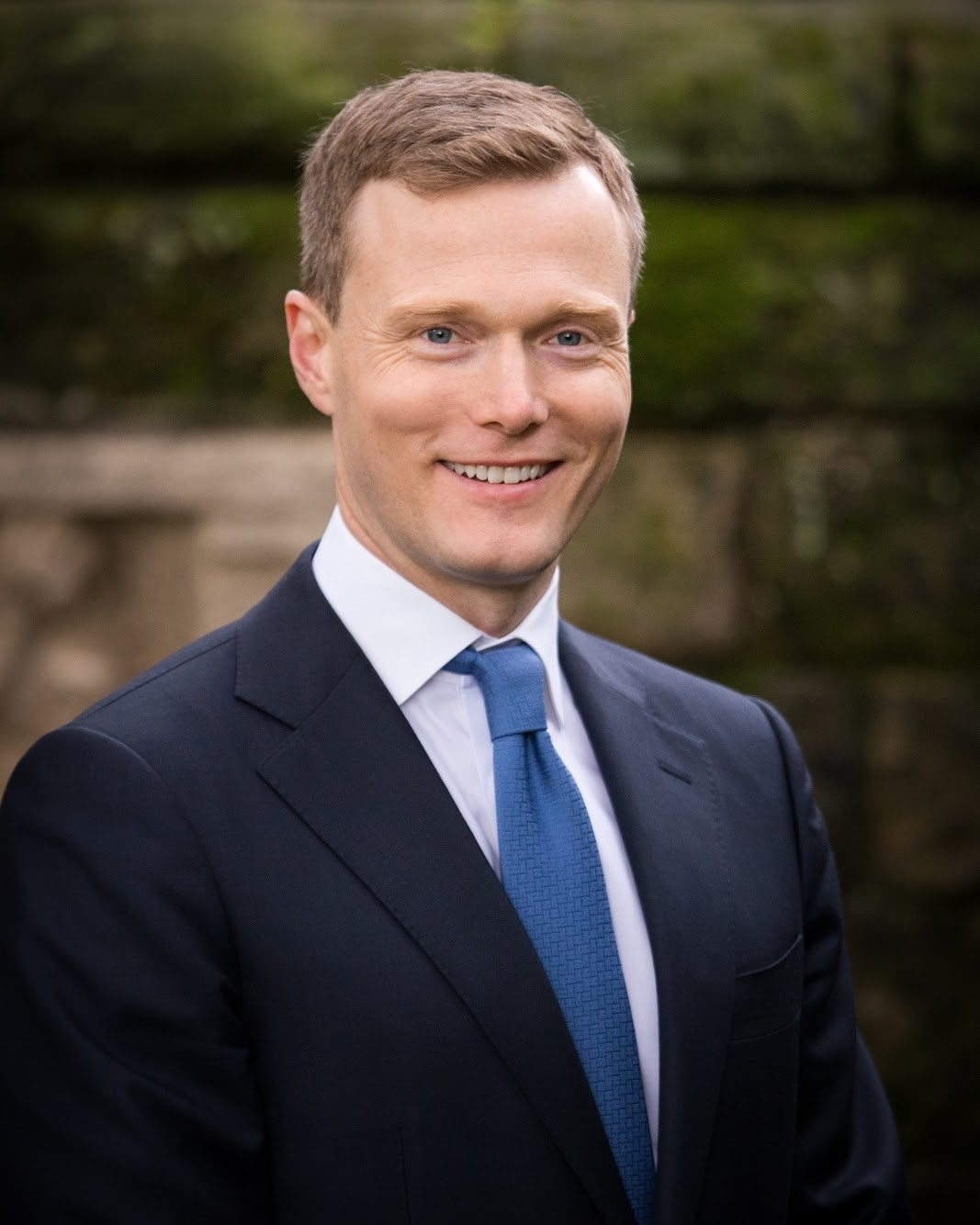
- Born: 1977 (age 48–49); St. Louis, Missouri, U.S.
- Occupations: Professor; Author; Foreign policy advisor; Government official
- Spouse: Olivia DeMay
- Children: 2
- Relatives: Brad Kroenig (brother)

Academic background
- Education: University of Missouri (BA); University of California, Berkeley (MA, PhD)

Matthew Kroenig (born 1977) is an American political scientist and national security strategist currently serving as vice president of the Atlantic Council and professor in the Department of Government and the Edmund A. Walsh School of Foreign Service at Georgetown University. Kroenig is known for his research on international security and nuclear weapons.

== Early life and education ==
Kroenig was raised in St. Louis, Missouri. He graduated from Oakville Senior High School in 1996. He earned a Bachelor of Arts degree in history summa cum laude from the University of Missouri in 2000, as well as a Master of Arts degree in 2003 and Ph.D. in political science in 2007 from the University of California, Berkeley. His Ph.D. dissertation was titled "The Enemy of my Enemy is my Customer: Why States Provide Sensitive Nuclear Assistance." He completed a predoctoral fellowship at Stanford University and a postdoctoral fellowship at Harvard University.

== Personal life ==
His brother, Brad, is a fashion model, and his sister, Julie, is a former broadcast anchor at ABC. His wife, Olivia (née DeMay) is a pharmaceutical sales representative and former NFL cheerleader for the Baltimore Ravens. Kroenig and his wife reside in Washington, D.C., with their two children, Eleanora and Henry.

== Career ==
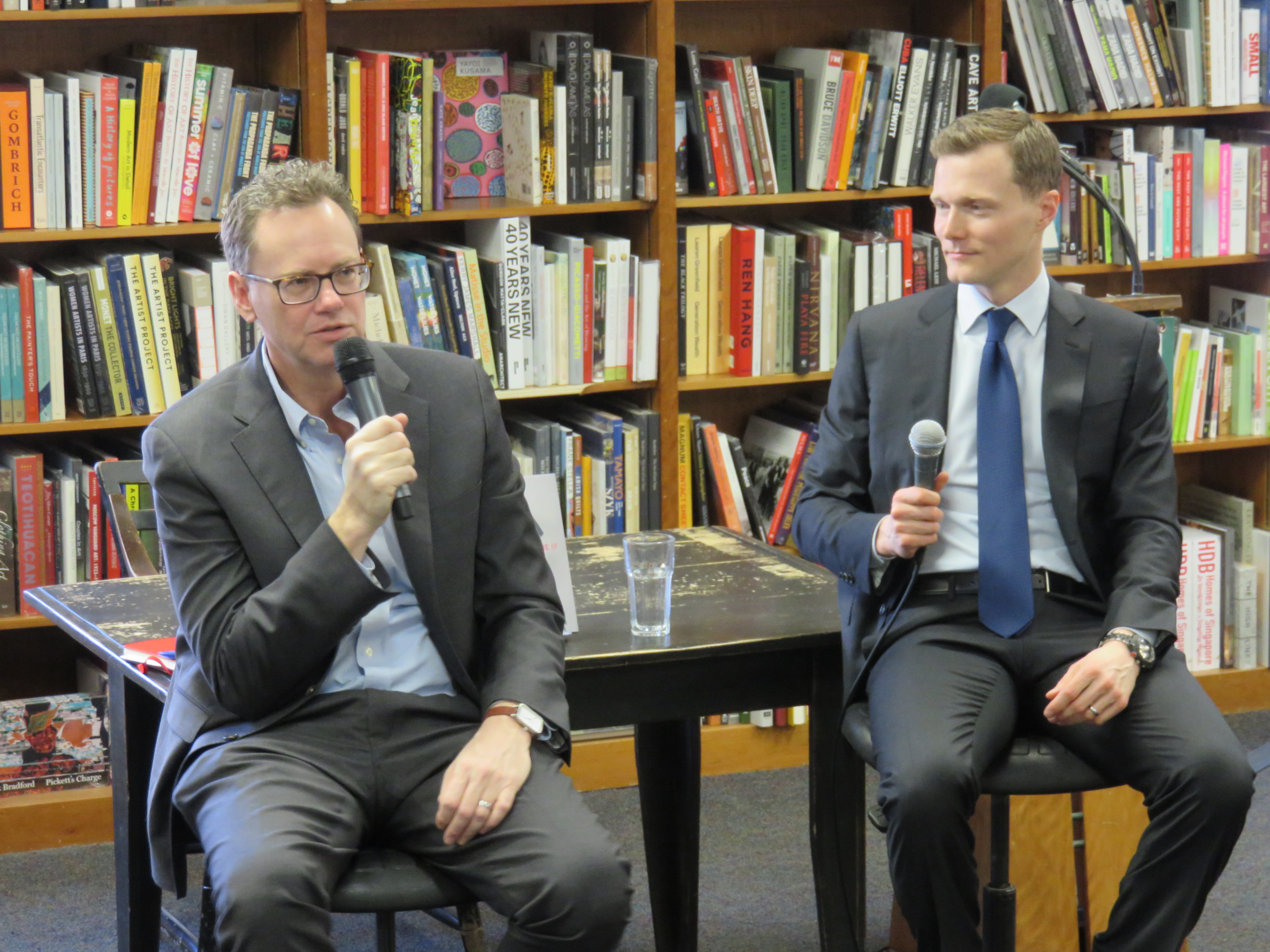
Kroenig (right) with Francis J. Gavin (left) at Politics and Prose in 2018

In 2005, Kroenig worked as a strategist in the Office of the Secretary of Defense, where he was the principal author of the first ever U.S.-government-wide strategy for deterring terrorist networks (as referred in the book Counterstrike, chs. 2, 11).

From 2010 to 2011, Kroenig returned to the Pentagon on a Council on Foreign Relations International Affairs Fellowship to serve as a special advisor on Iran policy in the Office of the Secretary of Defense. In that role, he developed strategic options to address Iran's nuclear program. Upon leaving, he gained widespread attention for his writing on the viability of the U.S. military option for degrading Iran's nuclear facilities, including in The New York Times and Foreign Affairs.

Kroenig served as a foreign policy advisor on Mitt Romney's 2012 presidential campaign.

During the Republican primaries of the 2016 election, he was first a senior national security advisor to Scott Walker's campaign, and then a senior advisor on Marco Rubio's 2016 presidential campaign. During the primary, Kroenig signed a "Never Trump" letter, denouncing his candidacy. He has said that he signed the letter because he saw it as part of the campaigning for Rubio. After Trump became president, Kroenig regretted signing the letter. A few months into the administration, Kroenig wrote a Foreign Affairs article defending the Trump administration's foreign policy.

He is a professor of government and foreign service at Georgetown University. He is the Atlantic Council's vice president and senior director of the Scowcroft Center for Strategy and Security.

== Reception ==
He has been named as one of the top 25 most-cited political scientists of his generation by a 2019 study in Perspectives on Politics.

Kroenig's research which argues that the states with greater nuclear superiority and greater stakes are more likely to win disputes has been disputed by other scholars who fail to find that nuclear superiority increases the likelihood of favorable bargaining outcomes.

Kroenig has drawn criticism over his argument for war with Iran to prevent it from pursuing nuclear weapons. Bill Keller wrote that "Kroenig ... apparently aspires to the Strangelovian superhawk role occupied in previous decades by the likes of John Bolton and Richard Perle. His former colleagues at Defense were pretty appalled by his [Foreign Affairs] article, which combines the alarmist worst case of the Iranian nuclear threat with the rosiest best case of America’s ability to make things better".

== Publications ==
=== Books ===
Kroenig is an author, co-author, or co-editor of seven books. These include:

- The Return of Great Power Rivalry: Democracy Versus Autocracy from the Ancient World to the U.S. and China (2020)
- The Logic of American Nuclear Strategy (2018)
- Nonproliferation Policy and Nuclear Posture: Causes and Consequences for the Spread of Nuclear Weapons (2015)
- A Time to Attack: The Looming Iranian Nuclear Threat (2014)
- The Handbook of National Legislatures: A Global Survey (2011)
- Causes and Consequences of Nuclear Proliferation (2011)
- Exporting the Bomb: Technology Transfer and the Spread of Nuclear Weapons (2010)

=== Articles ===
China Is Both Weak and Dangerous, Foreign Policy, December 7, 2020 (co-authored with Jeffrey Cimmino)
