= Jean Westwood (politician) =

American politician

Chair of the Democratic National Committee
- In office July 14, 1972 – December 9, 1972
- Preceded by: Larry O'Brien
- Succeeded by: Robert Strauss

Personal details
- Born: November 22, 1923 Price, Utah, U.S.
- Died: August 18, 1997 (aged 73) American Fork, Utah, U.S.
- Party: Democratic
- Education: Carbon College

Jean Miles Westwood (November 22, 1923 – August 18, 1997) was an American political figure. She was appointed the first female chair of the Democratic National Committee by Democratic presidential candidate George McGovern on July 14, 1972. Between 1976 and 1988, Westwood worked for the presidential campaigns of Terry Sanford, Edward Kennedy, Gary Hart, and Bruce Babbitt.

Born Jean Miles in Price, Utah, she attended Carbon College (now Utah State University Eastern) and took classes at the University of Utah, Utah State University, the University of Colorado, and San Diego State College. She married Richard E. Westwood in 1941. They started a mink farm together in 1951.

Westwood was one of McGovern's advisors who recommended dropping Thomas F. Eagleton from the ticket.

== Sources ==
- Utah history encyclopedia article on Westwood

Party political offices
Preceded by Larry O'Brien	Chair of the Democratic National Committee; 1972	Succeeded by Robert Strauss
