= RGK Mobile =

Mobile payments solutions provider

- Company type: Private
- Industry: M-Commerce
- Founded: 2014; 11 years ago
- Founders: Evgeny Kayumov; Roman Taranov
- Areas served: Global
- Key people: Roman Taranov (CEO); Evgeny Kayumov (Chief Marketing Officer)
- Products: Mobile Operator Solutions; Payment Aggregation; Virtual Mobile Content Provider; Pre-approved Offers; RGK Engine

RGK Mobile is a global m-commerce service provider.

== Company ==
RGK Mobile is a global provider of mobile carrier payment solutions, specializing in payment aggregation.

== Services ==
- Mobile Operator Solutions
- Payment Aggregation
- Virtual Mobile Content Provider
- Pre-approved Offers
- RGK Engine

== Key people ==
- Roman Taranov- Co-founder and CEO
- Evgeny Kayumov- Co-founder and Chief Marketing Officer
