= RGK Center for Philanthropy and Community Service =

Research center at University of Texas at Austin

Coordinates: 30.285689°N 97.728419°W

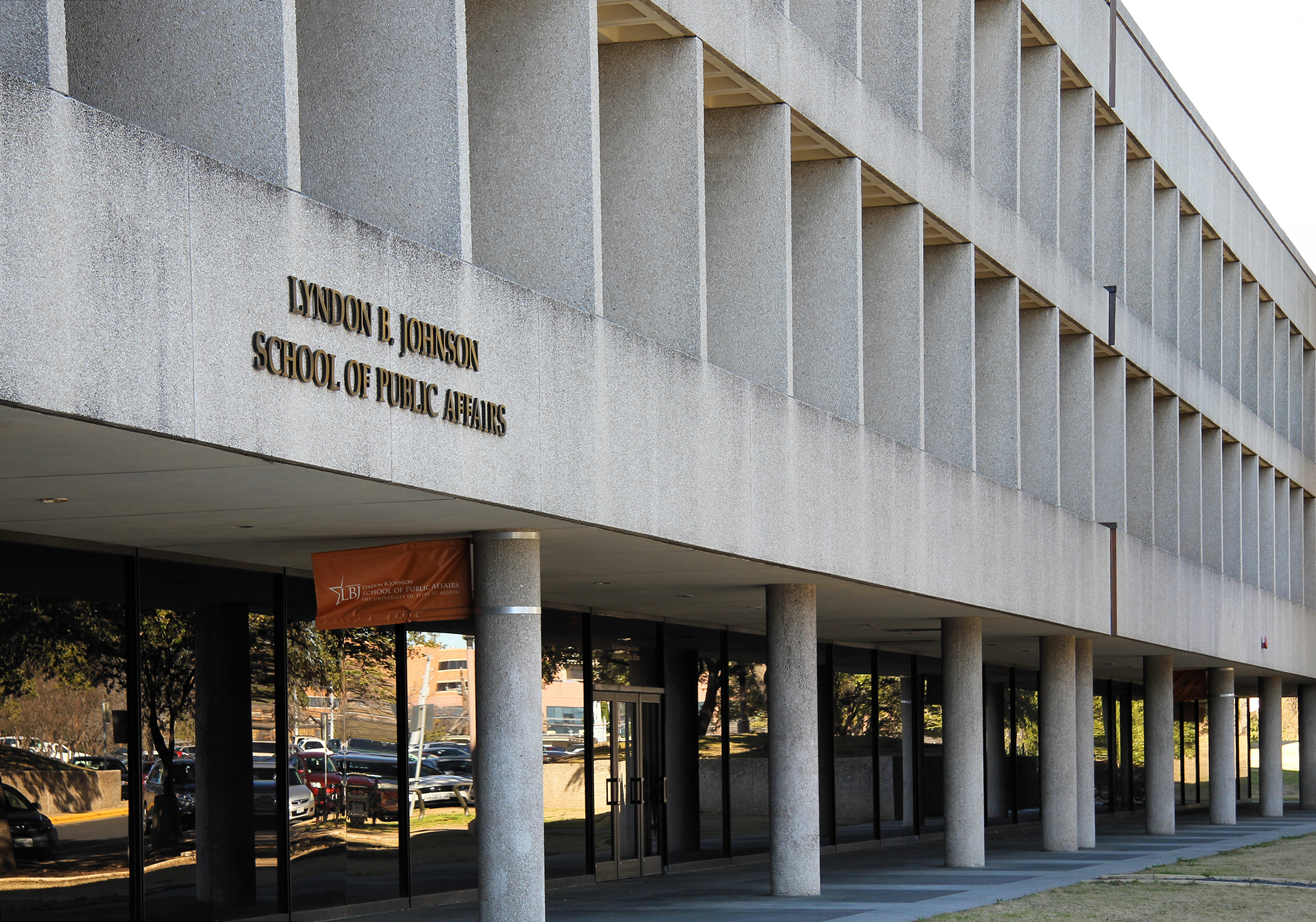

The RGK Center for Philanthropy and Community Service is a research center at University of Texas at Austin located in the Lyndon B. Johnson School of Public Affairs. The teaching and research of the RGK Center are focused in the areas of nonprofit organizations, philanthropy, social entrepreneurship, and volunteerism.

== History ==
The RGK Center was founded in 2000 by Curtis W. Meadows, Jr. with a $5 million grant from the RGK Foundation.

== Faculty and leadership ==
- David Springer, Director of the RGK Center and Distinguished Teaching Professor in the School of Social Work
- Francie Ostrower, Professor of Public Affairs and Fine Arts and Senior Fellow
- Sarah Jane Rehnborg, Professor of Public Affairs in Volunteerism and Board Governance
- Joshua Busby, Associate Professor of Public Affairs
- Ken Gladish, Adjunct Professor of Public Policy
- Meeta Kothare, Adjunct Professor of Public Policy
- Mark Clayton Hand, Adjunct Assistant Professor of Social Entrepreneurship

== Education ==
Academic Programs

- Portfolio Program in Nonprofit Studies:
  Graduate certificate program focused in nonprofit management, volunteerism, and philanthropy. Open to graduate and PhD-level students at The University of Texas at Austin.
- Summer Fellowship Program:
  A four-week seminar led by Peter Frumkin for graduate students conducting research in the areas of nonprofit management, philanthropy, volunteerism, social entrepreneurship, and global civil society.
- Developing Civil Society Education via Case Studies: A North American Perspective:
  Students research and develop case studies of civil society organizations in Canada, United States, or Mexico while studying abroad.
- Curtis W. Meadows, Jr. Social Enterprise Program:
  University of Texas at Austin graduate students serve as consultants to nonprofit organizations in Latin America.

Executive Education

- Strategic Management Program for Nonprofit Leaders:
  Three-day programs for nonprofit professionals focused on nonprofit leadership and management.

== Dell Social Innovation Competition ==
Originally titled the Social Innovation Competition, the RGK Center founded the annual competition in 2006 with Dell joining as a sponsor in 2009. The Dell Social Innovation Competition offered a $50,000 grand prize to college student entrepreneurs that develop innovative solutions to significant social issues.

== Key publications ==
- Ostrower, Francie (1995). Why the Wealthy Give: The Culture of Elite Philanthropy. Princeton University.
- Frumkin, Peter (2002). On Being Nonprofit: A Conceptual and Policy Primer. Harvard University.
- Frumkin, Peter (editor); Jonathan Imber (editor) (2004). In Search of the Nonprofit Sector. Transaction.
- Ostrower, Francie (2004). Trustees of Culture: Power, Wealth, and Status on Elite Arts Boards. University of Chicago.
- Frumkin, Peter (2006). Strategic Giving: The Art and Science of Philanthropy. University of Chicago.
- Angel, Jacqueline L. Inheritance (2007) in Contemporary America: The Social Dimensions of Giving across Generations. Johns Hopkins University.
- Musick, Marc; John Wilson (2007). Volunteers: A Social Profile. Indiana University.
- Rehnborg, Sarah Jane (May 2009). Strategic Volunteer Engagement: A Guide for Nonprofit and Public Sector Leaders.
- Frumkin, Peter (2010). The Essence of Strategic Giving. University of Chicago.
- Frumkin, Peter; JoAnn Jastrzab (2010). Serving Country and Community. Harvard University.
- Busby, Joshua (2010). Moral Movements and Foreign Policy. Cambridge University.
