= Bobby Chesney =

American legal scholar (born 1971)

Robert M Chesney
- Born: June 23, 1971 (age 55); San Antonio, Texas, U.S.
- Education: Texas Christian University (BS); Harvard Law School (JD)

Robert M. Chesney (born June 23, 1971) is an American lawyer and the Dean of the University of Texas School of Law. He is the Charles I. Francis Professor in Law and was the associate dean for academic affairs before becoming the dean. Chesney teaches courses relating to U.S. national security and constitutional law. He is also the director of the Strauss Center for International Security and Law. Chesney addresses issues involving national security and law, including matters relating to military detention, the use of force, terrorism-related prosecutions, the role of the courts in national security affairs and the relationship between military and intelligence community activities. He is a co-founder and contributor along with Benjamin Wittes and Jack Goldsmith to the Lawfare Blog. He also co-hosts The National Security Law Podcast with Stephen Vladeck.

== Career ==
In addition to his post at the University of Texas School of Law, Chesney is also a non-resident senior fellow at the Brookings Institution, a senior editor for the Journal of National Security Law & Policy and director of the Robert S. Strauss Center for International Security and Law. He also holds a courtesy appointment at the LBJ School of Public Policy. In 2009, he served on the Detention Policy Task Force created by President Barack Obama, which was tasked with developing long-term policy in relation to the capture, detention, trial or other disposition of persons in the context of combat and counterterrorism operations. Previously, he was a law professor at Wake Forest University School of Law. Before that he practiced law with Davis Polk & Wardwell in New York City. He clerked on both the United States District Court for the Southern District of New York and the United States Court of Appeals for the Second Circuit. Chesney is a magna cum laude graduate of both Harvard Law School and Texas Christian University.

In May 2022, it was announced that Chesney had been selected to be the next dean of the University of Texas School of Law, succeeding Ward Farnsworth, who had held the position since 2012.

== Teaching ==
Chesney has taught a range of subjects, including constitutional law, national security law, evidence, the role of the judiciary in national security affairs, civil procedure, and U.S. counterterrorism policy in legal and historical perspective. He was named Wake Forest University School of Law's Teacher of the Year for 2004 and 2007.

== Publications ==
Chesney has written or co-authored many articles relating to the legal aspects of U.S. national security policies and practices:

- Robert M. Chesney (1997). "National Insecurity: Nuclear Material Availability and the Threat of Nuclear Terrorism". Loyola of Los Angeles International and Comparative Law Journal.
- Robert M. Chesney (2000). "Old Wine or New? The Shocks-the-Conscience Standard and the Distinction Between Legislative and Executive Action". Syracuse Law Review.
- Robert M. Chesney (2003). "The Proliferation Security Initiative and Interdiction of Weapons of Mass Destruction on the High Seas". National Security Law Report.
- Robert M. Chesney (2003). "Civil Liberties and the Terrorism Prevention Paradigm: The Guilt by Association Critique (book review)". Michigan Law Review. SSRN 396503.
- Robert M. Chesney (2004). "Democratic-Republican Societies, Subversion, and the Limits of Legitimate Political Dissent in the Early Republic". North Carolina Law Review. SSRN 465820.
- Robert M. Chesney (2005). "The Sleeper Scenario: Terrorism-Support Laws and the Demands of Prevention". Harvard Journal on Legislation. SSRN 587442.
- Robert M. Chesney (2005). "Careful Thinking about Counterterrorism Policy (book review)". Journal of National Security Law and Policy. SSRN 610585.
- Robert M. Chesney (2006). "Leaving Guantánamo: The Law of International Detainee Transfers". University of Richmond Law Review. SSRN 827604.
- Robert M. Chesney (2007). "Federal Prosecution of Terrorism-Related Offenses: Conviction and Sentencing Data in Light of the 'Soft Sentence' and 'Data Reliability' Critiques". Lewis and Clark Law Review. SSRN 1005478.
- Robert M. Chesney (2007). "Beyond Conspiracy? Anticipatory Prosecution and the Challenge of Unaffiliated Terrorism". Southern California Law Review. SSRN 932608.
- Robert M. Chesney (2007). "State Secrets and the Limits of National Security Litigation". George Washington Law Review. SSRN 946676.
- Robert M. Chesney (2007). "Disaggregating Deference: The Judicial Power and Executive Treaty Interpretations". Iowa Law Review. SSRN 931997.
- Robert M. Chesney (2007). "Anticipatory Prosecution in Terrorism-Related Cases". The Changing Role of the American Prosecutor.
- Robert M. Chesney (2007). "Terrorism and Criminal Prosecutions in the United States" (PDF). Commission of Inquiry into the Investigation of the Bombing of Air India Flight 182. Archived from the original (PDF) on March 3, 2016.
- Robert M. Chesney (2007). "Judicial Review, Combatant Status Determinations, and the Possible Consequences of Boumediene". Harvard International Law Journal.
- Robert M. Chesney (2007). "Panel Report: Beyond Article III Courts: Military Tribunals, Status Review Tribunals, and Immigration Courts". Cardozo Public Law, Policy, and Ethics Journal.
- Robert M. Chesney co-authored with Jack Goldsmith (2008). "Terrorism and the Convergence of Criminal and Military Detention Models". Stanford Law Review. SSRN 1055501.
- Robert M. Chesney (2008). "Military Detention and the Post-Guantanamo Era: A Reply to David Cole". Boston Review.
- Robert M. Chesney (2008). "State Secrets Legislation and the Question of Reform" (PDF). Roger Williams Law Review.
- Robert M. Chesney (2009). "Terrorism, Criminal Prosecution, and the Preventive Detention Debate". South Texas Law Review. SSRN 587442.
- Robert M. Chesney (2009). "National Security Fact Deference". Virginia Law Review. SSRN 1348804.
- Robert M. Chesney (2009). "Detention of Terrorists and the Acceleration of the Convergence Trend". The Legal Workshop. Archived from the original on May 21, 2012.
- Robert M. Chesney (September 10, 2009). "Detention Debate in Black and White". The Washington Post.
- Robert M. Chesney (2009). "International Decision: Boumediene v. Bush". American Journal of International Law. JSTOR 20456685.
- Robert M. Chesney (2009). "Supreme Court of the United States: The District Court Decision on Remand in Boumediene v. Bush". International Legal Materials.
- Robert M. Chesney co-authored with Benjamin Wittes and Rabea Benhalim (2010). "The Emerging Law of Detention: The Guantanamo Habeas Cases as Lawmaking". Brookings Institution.
- Robert M. Chesney (2010). "National Security, Litigation, and the State Secrets Privilege". Legal Issues in the Struggle Against Terror.
- Robert M. Chesney co-authored with Benjamin Wittes (February 5, 2010). "The Courts' Shifting Rules on Detainees". The Washington Post.
- Robert M. Chesney (2010). "Prisoners of War". Max Planck Encyclopedia of International Law.
- Robert M. Chesney (2010). "The Preventive Dilemma: A Reply to Professor Cole". California Law Review Online.
- Robert M. Chesney (2010). "Optimizing Criminal Prosecution as a Counterterrorism Tool". Legal Architecture for the War on Terror.
- Robert M. Chesney co-authored with Benjamin Wittes and Larkin Reynolds (2011). "The Emerging Law of Detention 2.0: The Guantanamo Habeas Cases as Lawmaking". Brooking Institution. SSRN 1839793.
- Robert M. Chesney (2011). "Who May Be Held? Military Detention Through the Habeas Lens". Boston College Law Review. SSRN 1725533.
- Robert M. Chesney (2011). "Iraq and the Military Detention Debate: Firsthand Perspectives from the Other War, 2003-2010". Virginia Journal of International Law. SSRN 1690513.
- Robert M. Chesney (2011). A Primer on the Libya/War Powers Resolution Compliance Debate. Brookings Institution.
- Robert M. Chesney co-authored with Benjamin Wittes and Matthew Waxman (2011). "Transfers of Guantanamo Detainees to Yemen: Policy Continuity between Administrations". A Report for the House Armed Services Subcommittee on Investigations.
- Robert M. Chesney (2011). "The Supreme Court, Material Support, and the Lasting Impact of Holder v. Humanitarian Law Project" (PDF). Wake Forest Law Review Online.
- Robert M. Chesney (2011). "The Least Worst Venue". Foreign Policy.
- Robert M. Chesney (2011). "Bad Advice or Bad Law: Considering Post-9/11 Legal Advice (book review)". Tulsa Law Review. SSRN 1540601.
- Robert M. Chesney (2011). "Who May Be Killed? Anwar al-Awlaki as a Case Study in the International Legal Regulation of Lethal Force". Yearbook of International Humanitarian Law. SSRN 1754223.
- Robert M. Chesney (2012). "Military-Intelligence Convergence and the Law of the Title 10/Title 50 Debate". Journal of National Security Law and Policy. SSRN 1945392.
- Robert M. Chesney (2013). "Beyond the Battlefield, Beyond Al Qaeda: The Destabilizing Legal Architecture of Counterterrorism" Michigan Law Review. 2138623
- Robert M. Chesney (2013). "Computer Network Operations and U.S. Domestic Law: An Overview" International Law Studies (Naval War College). 119080
- Robert M. Chesney (2012). "Military-Intelligence Convergence and the Law of the Title 10/Title 50 Debate". Journal of National Security Law and Policy. SSRN 1945392.
- Robert M. Chesney (2015). "Postwar" Harvard National Security Journal. 2332228

== Podcast ==
Chesney co-hosts the National Security Law Podcast with fellow University of Texas law professor Stephen Vladeck.
