= LBJ School of Public Affairs =

Public policy school of the University of Texas

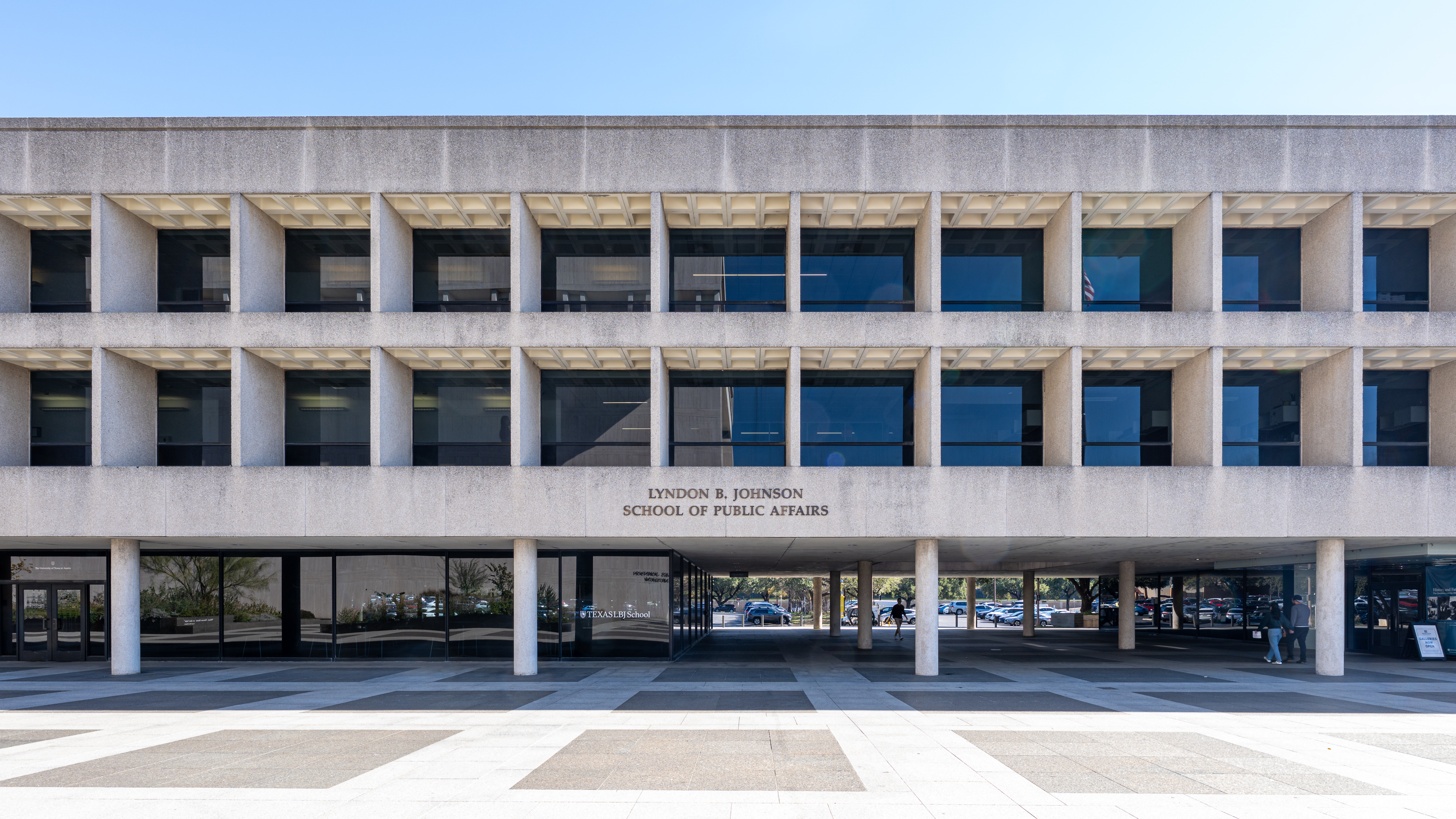
- Type: Public
- Established: 1970
- Parent institution: University of Texas at Austin
- Accreditation: APSIA
- Academic affiliations: TPC
- Endowment: $43.5 million (December 31, 2015) + $157 million in the LBJ Foundation
- Dean: JR DeShazo
- Academic staff: 96
- Students: 317 (Spring 2014) (215 MPAff, 102 MGPS)
- Doctoral students: 35
- Location: Austin, Texas, United States; 30°17′09″N 97°43′43″W
- Website: lbj.utexas.edu

The LBJ School of Public Affairs (formally the Lyndon B. Johnson School of Public Affairs) is a graduate-level public policy school at the University of Texas at Austin.

Founded in 1970, the school offers training in public policy analysis and administration in government and public affairs-related areas of the private and nonprofit sectors. Degree programs include a Master of Public Affairs (MPAff), an undergraduate Bachelor's of Public Affairs (BPAff), a mid-career MPAff sequence, 16 MPAff dual degree programs, a Master of Global Policy Studies (MGPS), eight MGPS dual degree programs, an Executive Master of Public Leadership, and a Ph.D. in public policy.

== Overview ==
The LBJ School offers a Master of Public Affairs program in public policy analysis and administration, with 16 dual degree programs for the Master of Public Affairs degree and a second degree. Program offerings include Master of Public Affairs program, a mid-career master's program, and the seventeen master's-level programs leading to dual degrees: Advertising; Asian Studies; Business Administration; Communication Studies; Energy and Earth Resources; Engineering; Information Studies; Journalism; Latin American Studies; Law; Middle Eastern Studies; Public Health; Radio, Television, Film; Russian, East European, and Eurasian Studies; Social Work; and Women's and Gender Studies. The school offers a Ph.D. in public policy. Master's students have the option to specialize in one of seven areas: international affairs; natural resources and the environment; nonprofit and philanthropic studies; public leadership and management; social and economic policy; technology, innovation, and information policy; or urban and state affairs.

In 2008, the LBJ School introduced a Master of Global Policy Studies. Program offerings include specializations in the areas of security, law and diplomacy; international trade and finance; development; global governance and international law; energy, environment, and technology; regional international policy; and customized specializations. Program offerings include ten dual degree programs: Asian Studies; Business; Energy and Earth Resources; Information Studies; Journalism; Latin American Studies; Law; Middle Eastern Studies; Public Health; and Russian, East European, and Eurasian Studies. The school offers a Portfolio Program in Arts and Cultural Management and Entrepreneurship and a Portfolio Program in Nonprofit Studies. The school sponsors non-degree programs for public affairs professionals.

As of 2011–2012, the LBJ School has graduated 3,508 master's degree students since its first inaugural class in 1972, as well as 56 Ph.D. students from 1992 to August 2013.

In 2013, the LBJ School launched an Executive Master in Public Leadership for mid-career professionals.

Beginning in 2025, the LBJ school introduced its first undergraduate degree program, the Bachelor's of Public Affairs degree. The inaugural class of the program are scheduled to graduate in 2029.

== Centers ==
The LBJ School of Public Affairs has five research centers. Some of the School's centers have sponsored other conferences, workshops, and publications.

- The Center for Politics and Governance combined academics teaching.
- The Ray Marshall Center is a university-based research center. The Center's activities and services include: Program evaluation, including process and implementation, impact and benefit/cost analysis; survey research; labor market analysis; program design and development; and training and technical assistance.
- Center for Health and Social Policy (CHASP) studies health and social policy and conducts research in policymaking.
- The RGK Center for Philanthropy and Community Service researches philanthropy, nonprofit management, and social entrepreneurship. The Center trains students through a university-wide graduate program in nonprofit studies.
- Robert S. Strauss Center for International Security and Law

== Student initiatives ==
The Great Society Fund was created by the class in 2005 to finance social entrepreneurship projects started by LBJ students and alumni.

The Baines Report is the officially-sponsored student publication of the LBJ School of Public Affairs. Led by students, the Baines Report publishes student opinion pieces and event coverage for the LBJ School.

== Commencement speakers ==
- 1972: Allen E. Pritchard, Jr., incoming Vice President, National League of Cities
- 1973: J. J. Pickle, U.S. Congressman from Texas; member of the House Ways and Means Committee
- 1974: Richard W. Bolling, U.S. Congressman from Missouri; Chairman of the House Rules Committee
- 1975: Renell Parkins, Professor of Architecture and Planning, UT Austin
- 1976: Alice Rivlin, Director, Congressional Budget Office
- 1977: Kenneth E. Boulding, Distinguished Professor of Economics, University of Colorado at Boulder; 1976-77 Distinguished Visiting Tom Slick Professor of World Peace, LBJ School
- 1978: Jim Wright, U.S. Congressman from Texas (Majority Leader)
- 1979: Barbara Jordan, former U.S. Congresswoman from Texas; holder of the Lyndon B. Johnson Public Service Professorship, LBJ School
- 1980: Joseph A. Califano, Jr., former U.S. Secretary of Health, Education, and Welfare, Carter Administration; former Special Assistant to President Lyndon Johnson
- 1981: Walter Mondale, former Vice President of the United States
- 1982: Robert S. Strauss, former Special U.S. Representative for Trade Negotiations; former Chairman, Democratic National Committee
- 1983: Henry Cisneros, Mayor of San Antonio
- 1984: G. Alexander Heard, Chancellor Emeritus and Professor of Political Science, Vanderbilt University; Chairman of the Board, Ford Foundation
- 1985: Bill Moyers, editor, correspondent, and news analyst, CBS News; former Special Assistant to the President and Press Secretary to President Lyndon Johnson
- 1986: Gary Hart, U.S. Senator from Colorado
- 1987: Jim Wright, Speaker, U.S. House of Representatives
- 1988: Maxine Waters, U.S. Congresswoman, 43rd District, California
- 1989: Chase Untermeyer, White House Presidential Personnel Director, Bush Administration
- 1990: Corrado Pirzio-Biroli, Deputy Head of the European Community Delegation, Washington, D.C.
- 1991: Ann Richards, Governor of Texas
- 1992: William F. Winter, former Governor of Mississippi
- 1993: Richard Lamm, former Governor of Colorado
- 1994: William Greider, author and journalist
- 1995: Ellen Malcolm, founder and president, EMILY's List (resource for pro-choice Democratic women candidates)
- 1996: Ann Richards, former governor of Texas
- 1997: Jack Rosenthal, editor, New York Times Magazine
- 1998: Paul Begala, staff adviser to President Bill Clinton
- 1999: Kenneth S. Apfel, U.S. Commissioner of Social Security; LBJ School Class of 1978
- 2000: Judith A. Winston, undersecretary and general counsel, U.S. Department of Education; former director, President Clinton's initiative on race
- 2001: James Carville, political strategist and consultant
- 2002: George H. W. Bush, 41st president of the United States
- 2003: Gwen Ifill, moderator and managing editor, PBS Washington Week
- 2004: Liz Carpenter, former press secretary for Lady Bird Johnson
- 2005: Donald Evans, 34th secretary of the U.S. Department of Commerce
- 2006: Bill Clinton, 42nd president of the United States
- 2007: Bob Schieffer, CBS News Washington
- 2008: Vernon Jordan, former president of the National Urban League
- 2009: Bill Bradley, former U.S. Senator from New Jersey
- 2010: James B. Steinberg, Deputy Secretary of State, U.S. Department of State
- 2011: Kathleen Merrigan, Deputy Secretary of Agriculture, U.S. Department of Agriculture
- 2012: Bill Owens, Former Governor of Colorado
- 2013: Helene D. Gayle, CEO of CARE USA
- 2014: Julian Castro, Mayor of San Antonio
- 2021: Ibram X. Kendi
- 2022: Ambassador Vilma Socorro Martinez, former U.S. Ambassador to Argentina
- 2023: The Honorable Jaime Lizárraga, Commissioner of the U.S. Securities and Exchange Commission
- 2024: Shamina Singh, founder and president, Mastercard Center for Inclusive Growth

== Rankings ==
The LBJ School is ranked 7th among public affairs programs in 2022 by U.S. News & World Report, up from 8th in 2021.

== List of deans ==
1. John A. Gronouski (September 1969 – September 1974)
2. William B. Cannon (October 1974 – January 1977)
3. Alan K. Campbell (February 1977 – April 1977)
4. Elspeth Rostow (April 1977 – May 1983)
5. Max Sherman (July 1983 – May 1997)
6. Edwin Dorn (July 1997 – December 2004)
7. Bobby Ray Inman (January 2005 – December 2005)
8. James B. Steinberg (January 2006 – January 2009)
9. Bobby Ray Inman (January 2009 – March 2010)
10. Robert Hutchings (March 2010 – September 2015)
11. Angela Evans (January 2016 – 2020)
12. J.R. DeShazo (September 2021 –)

== Notable alumni ==
- Stacey Abrams, M.P.Aff. 1998, Minority Leader of the Georgia House of Representatives; 2018 and 2022 Democratic Nominee for Governor of Georgia
- Kenneth S. Apfel, M.P.Aff. 1978, Commissioner of the Social Security Administration from 1997 until his term ended in January 2001
- Rodney Ellis, M.P.Aff. 1977, Texas State Senator
- Luis Espino, M.P.Aff. 2003, speechwriter for 2006–2012 Mexico's President Felipe Calderón
- Ruth Hardy, M.P.Aff. 1996, member, Vermont Senate
- Bill Owens, M.P.Aff. 1975, Governor of Colorado from 1999–2007
- Kathleen Merrigan, M.P.Aff. 1987, Deputy Secretary, USDA
- Sarah Eckhardt, M.P.Aff. 1998, Texas State Senator in the Texas Senate; former County Judge of Travis County
- Nancy La Vigne, M.P.Aff. 1991, Director of the National Institute of Justice

== See also ==
List of facilities named after Lyndon Johnson
