= Matlock =

Matlock may refer to:

== Film and television ==
- Matlock (1986 TV series), American television series
  - Ben Matlock, the title character of the TV series by the same name
- Matlock (2024 TV series), a reboot of the original series
- Matlock Police, Australian television series

== Places ==
- Matlock, Derbyshire, a town in England
  - Matlock Bath, a village south of Matlock, Derbyshire, England
  - Matlock Bank, an area on a hill in Matlock, Derbyshire, England
  - Matlock Bridge, a bridge and surrounding area in Matlock, Derbyshire, England
- Matlock, Iowa, a small city in the US
- Matlock, Manitoba, a community in Canada
- Matlock, Victoria, a town in Australia
- Matlock, Washington, a small town in the US

== People ==
- Matlock (surname)

== Other uses ==
- Matlock Cable Tramway, cable tramway that served the town of Matlock between 1893 and 1927
- Matlock Town F.C., a football club in Matlock, England
- United States v. Matlock (1974), a Supreme Court case
- "Matlock", the tripcode of the persona behind QAnon
