= Matlock (surname) =

Matlock is a surname. Notable people with the surname include:

- Bob Matlock (1918–2006), Australian rules footballer
- Glen Matlock (born 1956), English bass player in the original line-up for punk band the Sex Pistols
- Jack F. Matlock Jr. (born 1929), American diplomat
- Jimmy Matlock (born 1959), American politician
- Leroy Matlock (1907–1968), American Negro league baseball player
- Mark Matlock (born 1969), founder and president of WisdomWorks Ministries
- Matty Matlock (1907–1978), American jazz musician and arranger
- Michelle Matlock, American professional clown and female lead in the Cirque du Soleil production Ovo
- Rebecca Matlock (1928–2019), photographer and wife of former U.S. Ambassador Jack F. Matlock, Jr
- Ronn Matlock (1947–2020), American singer and songwriter
- Scott Matlock (born 2000), American football player
- Spider Matlock (1901–1936), American stuntman and racing mechanic
- Victoria Matlock (born 1978), American musical theatre actress
