= Jack F. Matlock Jr. =

American diplomat (born 1929)

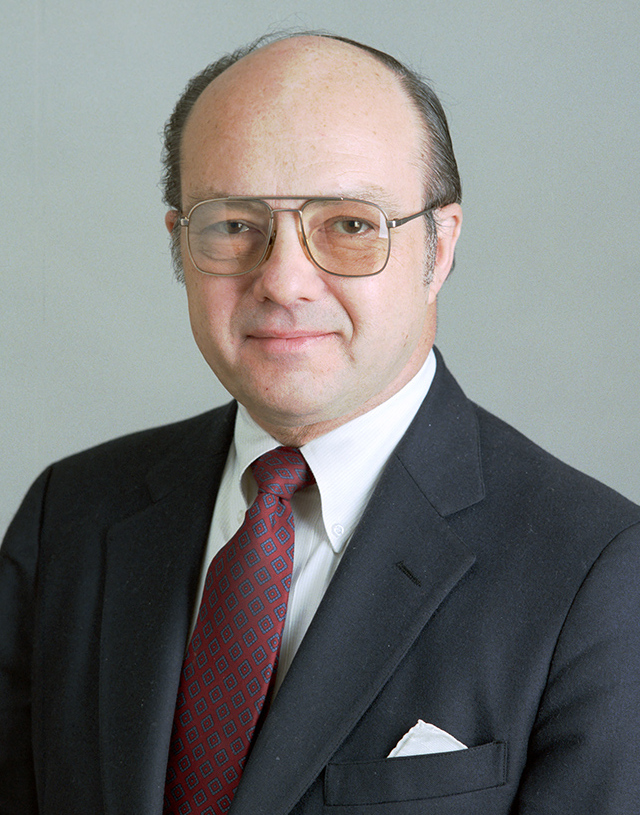
- Matlock Jr. c. 1986

United States Ambassador to the Soviet Union
- In office April 6, 1987 – August 11, 1991
- President: Ronald Reagan; George H. W. Bush
- Preceded by: Arthur A. Hartman
- Succeeded by: Robert S. Strauss

United States Ambassador to Czechoslovakia
- In office September 28, 1981 – September 20, 1983
- President: Ronald Reagan
- Preceded by: Francis J. Meehan
- Succeeded by: William H. Luers

Personal details
- Born: Jack Foust Matlock Jr. October 1, 1929 (age 97) Greensboro, North Carolina, U.S.
- Spouses: Rebecca Matlock (m. 1949; died 2019); Grace Baliunas Austin (m. 2020)
- Children: 5
- Education: Duke University; Columbia University
- Profession: Diplomat, educator, historian, linguist

Jack Foust Matlock Jr. (born October 1, 1929) is an American former ambassador, career Foreign Service Officer, teacher, historian, and linguist. He was a specialist in Soviet affairs during some of the most tumultuous years of the Cold War, and served as the U.S. ambassador to the Soviet Union from 1987 to 1991.

Matlock became interested in Russia as a Duke University undergraduate, and after studies at Columbia University and a stint as a Russian-language instructor at Dartmouth College, entered the Foreign Service in 1956. His 35-year career encompassed much of the Cold War period between the Soviet Union and the United States. His first assignment to Moscow was in 1961, and it was from the embassy there that he experienced the 1962 Cuban Missile Crisis, helping to translate diplomatic messages between the leaders. The next year he was posted to West Africa, and he later served in East Africa, during the post-colonial period of superpower rivalry.

At the beginning of détente, he was director of Soviet affairs in the State Department, and began to participate in the summit meetings between the leaders, eventually attending all but one of the U.S.–Soviet summits held in the 20-year period 1972–91. Matlock was back in Moscow in 1974, serving in the number two position in the embassy for four years. The Soviet invasion of Afghanistan in early 1980 ended the period of reduced tensions. Matlock was assigned to Moscow again in 1981 as acting ambassador during the first part of Ronald Reagan's presidency. Reagan appointed him as ambassador to Czechoslovakia and later asked him to return to Washington in 1983 to work at the National Security Council, with the assignment to develop a negotiating strategy to end the arms race. When Mikhail Gorbachev became the leader of the Soviet Union in 1985, arms negotiations and summit meetings resumed. Matlock was appointed ambassador to the Soviet Union in 1987 and saw the last years of the Soviet Union before he retired from the Foreign Service in 1991.

After leaving the Foreign Service, he wrote an account of the end of the Soviet Union titled Autopsy on an Empire, followed by an account of the end of the Cold War titled Reagan and Gorbachev: How the Cold War Ended, establishing his reputation as a historian. He joined the faculty of the Institute for Advanced Study and he went on to teach diplomacy at several New England colleges. In 1998, Matlock was elected to the American Philosophical Society.

== Biography ==
Born on October 1, 1929 in Greensboro, North Carolina, Jack Matlock graduated from Greensboro Senior High School (see Grimsley High School) in 1946, married Rebecca Burrum in 1949, graduated summa cum laude from Duke University in 1950, and later earned an M.A. from Columbia University in 1952. He taught Russian language and literature at Dartmouth College from 1953 to 1956.

He joined the Foreign Service in 1956, and served in Vienna, Garmisch-Partenkirchen, Moscow, Accra, Zanzibar, and Dar es Salaam. He was Director of Soviet Affairs in the State Department (1971–74), Diplomat in Residence at Vanderbilt University (1978–79), and deputy director of the Foreign Service Institute (1979–80). He served as U.S. ambassador to Czechoslovakia (1981–83) and as special assistant to the president for national security affairs and senior director for European and Soviet affairs on the National Security Council Staff (1983–86). His languages are Czech, French, German, Russian, and Swahili.

Matlock was US president Ronald Reagan's choice for the position of ambassador to the Soviet Union, serving from 1987 to 1991. His previous tours in Moscow were as vice consul and third secretary (1961–1963), minister counsellor and deputy chief of mission (1974–1978), and chargé d'affaires ad interim (1981).

After he retired from the Foreign Service in 1991, Matlock reentered the academic world, becoming the Kathryn and Shelby Cullom Davis Professor of the Practice of International Diplomacy at Columbia. After five years in that position he moved to the Institute for Advanced Study in Princeton, New Jersey, where he was George F. Kennan Professor from 1996 to 2001. Matlock has held visiting appointments at the Woodrow Wilson School of Public and International Affairs at Princeton University, at Hamilton College, at the Columbia University School of International and Public Affairs and at Mount Holyoke College. He has been awarded honorary doctorates by Greensboro College, Albright College and Connecticut College. Matlock completed his dissertation and received his Ph.D. from the Columbia University Graduate School of Arts and Sciences at their commencement ceremony on May 22, 2013.

Together, Jack and Rebecca Matlock had five children and three grandchildren. In later years they divided their time between a home in Princeton and her family's farm in Booneville, Tennessee. Rebecca died in 2019 and Matlock subsequently married Grace Baliunas Austin.

== Russian captivation ==
By his own account, Matlock became captivated by Russia having read Dostoyevsky as an undergraduate at Duke University. He went on to study Russian language and area studies at the Russian Institute at Columbia University, and became convinced that the principal challenge of American diplomacy in the post World War II period would be dealing with the Soviet Union. After his 1953 appointment to a position as Russian Instructor at Dartmouth College, he supplemented his income by preparing an index to Joseph Stalin's collected works on contract with the State Department. Because in 1956 the Soviet Union was a closed society, he decided his best chance to get to know Russia was to join the Foreign Service and become a diplomat. His ultimate career goal was clear from the beginning:

…when I entered the Foreign Service I shocked a lot of people by what seemed to be overweening ambition when I was asked "What do you want out of the Foreign Service?" I stated frankly, "I want to be the American ambassador to the Soviet Union."

== Moscow: as Third Secretary ==
After a tour in Vienna, Austria and Russian language training at the U.S. Army Russian Institute in Oberammergau, Matlock arrived in Moscow for the first time in 1961. Initially a Vice Consul, Matlock met with individuals seeking to visit or emigrate to the United States. His most famous case was Lee Harvey Oswald, who applied for a repatriation loan to return to the United States after having previously moved to the Soviet Union. Indeed, according to the records received by the Warren Commission, in May 1962, Jack Matlock conducted the exit interview which enabled the Oswald family to leave the USSR and return to the USA.

After a year, Matlock was promoted to Third Secretary in the Political Section. American foreign policy with regard to the Soviet Union, known as containment, had been articulated in 1947 by George F. Kennan, who was later to become a good friend of Matlock's. The American policy was basically to contain the spread of Communism, in the expectation that it would eventually collapse of internal contradictions. This did not prevent discussions between the Superpowers. In June 1961, President John F. Kennedy and First Secretary Nikita Khrushchev met in Vienna, and in December the United Nations General Assembly approved a draft joint resolution on principles for negotiating disarmament. This period also saw the beginnings of U.S. - U.S.S.R. cultural exchanges, notably the visit of poet Robert Frost to Moscow.

The containment policy was tested during the October 1962 Cuban Missile Crisis. Matlock, along with Richard Davies and Herbert Okun, translated communications between President John F. Kennedy and Nikita Khrushchev.

== Ghana and Tanzania ==
In late 1963, the Matlocks left Moscow for West Africa, arriving in Accra, Ghana. Kwame Nkrumah had become the first president of newly independent Ghana and post-colonial Africa was to be a venue for competition between the U.S. and Soviet Union for influence.

In 1967, Matlock was sent to East Africa to serve on Zanzibar as consul. It was his first opportunity to be head of a Foreign Service post. His predecessor as consul, Frank Carlucci, was later to become Secretary of Defense, and his successor, Thomas R. Pickering, was later to become Ambassador to the U.N.

Matlock's next assignment was as Deputy Chief of Mission in the capital of Tanzania, Dar es Salaam. Even in Africa, knowledge of Soviet Affairs proved useful. With Leonid Brezhnev in power, Soviet foreign policy as of 1968 was dictated by the Brezhnev Doctrine, which held that, once a country became Communist, it was never to leave the Soviet sphere of influence.

== Washington: as Director of Soviet Affairs ==
In 1971 Matlock became Director of Soviet Affairs in the State Department. During Richard Nixon's presidency, a period known as détente, there was a reduction of Cold War tension. Matlock participated in the negotiation of arms control treaties and other bilateral agreements. In fact, he attended every one of the U.S.-Soviet summits for the 20-year period 1972–1991, with the exception of the 1979 Carter - Brezhnev summit.

Summit Meetings 1972–79
Leaders	Topic	Venue	Dates	Reference
Nixon - Brezhnev	SALT I and ABM Treaties	Moscow	May 26, 1972	
Nixon - Brezhnev	Official Visit	Washington	June 18–26, 1973	
Nixon - Brezhnev	Official Visit	Moscow, Simferopol, Minsk	June 27-July 3, 1974	
Ford - Brezhnev	SALT I	Vladivostok	November 23, 1974	
Ford - Brezhnev	Helsinki Final Act	Helsinki	August 1, 1975	
Carter - Brezhnev	SALT II Treaty	Vienna	June 16–18, 1979	

== Moscow: as Deputy Chief of Mission ==
After four years in Washington, he spent four years as Deputy Chief of Mission (DCM), the number two position, at Embassy Moscow. These years cemented his reputation within the State Department as a Soviet expert. In early 1976, the State Department made public the fact that the Soviet Union had been beaming microwaves at the Moscow Embassy from a nearby building for many years. This caused concern about possible health effects of the low-level microwave radiation. Ironically, it was Soviet research that documented the psychological symptoms of sensitivity to microwave exposure. In the United States, the standards for safe exposure to microwaves were much more lenient than in the Soviet Union.

The August 26, 1977 ABC Evening News covered the story of a major fire at the embassy. Despite the severity of the fire, all personnel were evacuated safely, and the efforts of the embassy staff elicited a commendation from President Jimmy Carter. Former KGB agent Victor Sheymov testified before Congress in 1998 that the fire was deliberately induced by the Soviets in an effort to gain access to sensitive areas by agents posing as firemen.

== Stateside ==
Matlock returned to the United States and taught for a year at Vanderbilt University under the 'Diplomats in Residence' program. The following year, he came to Washington DC to take the number two position at the Foreign Service Institute, the State Department's language training school.

In January 1980, in response to the Soviet invasion of Afghanistan, President Carter postponed consideration of the SALT-2 Treaty and imposed a trade embargo. Also in 1980, the new embassy under construction in Moscow was found to be so riddled with listening devices that it would be unusable for secure work.

== Moscow: as Chargé d'Affaires ==
Matlock returned to Moscow in 1981 as acting ambassador, or chargé d'affaires. By April 24, President Reagan had cancelled the export embargo, and trade resumed. Matlock signalled the American desire for constructive engagement with the Soviets:

We are seeking an active dialogue on all levels. But a dialogue is useful only if it is candid, and we must learn not to take offense at candor but to use it to help us understand each other. - Jack F. Matlock Jr. (New York Times Quote of the Day for July 5, 1981)

On August 6, 1981, President Reagan ordered the development of a neutron bomb. While contentious, this had the desired effect of bringing the Soviets to the bargaining table, and negotiations on limiting nuclear weapons in Europe started on November 30.

== Czechoslovakia: as ambassador ==
In late 1980 Matlock had been appointed ambassador to Czechoslovakia by President Jimmy Carter. However, the appointment was not ratified by the Senate before Carter's election loss, and so it was with Ronald Reagan's re-appointment in 1981 that he became ambassador to Czechoslovakia. During his tenure, he was able to help resolve a major impediment to good relations: the return of 18.4 tons of gold that had been looted by the Nazis in World War II and kept, ever since its recovery by Allied forces, in American and British banks.

On March 23, 1983, President Reagan announced the Strategic Defense Initiative, a ground and space-based weapons system designed to protect from nuclear attack. Matlock continued to advise the president on policy toward the Soviet Union and on September 1, 1983, when the Soviets shot down commercial flight KAL 007, Matlock returned to Washington to work with White House officials.

== Washington: National Security Council ==
Reagan appointed Matlock to the position of special assistant to the president and senior director of European and Soviet affairs in the National Security Council (NSC) in order to develop a negotiating strategy to end the arms race. Earlier in the year, the long-standing containment strategy toward the U.S.S.R. had been modified by Matlock's predecessor Richard Pipes to include bringing internal pressure on the Soviets while conducting negotiations in the mutual interest. In following years, discussions with the Soviets were conducted under Matlock's "Four-Part Agenda" including Human Rights, Regional Issues, Arms Control, and Bilateral Issues.

On November 25, 1983, Soviet leader Yuri Andropov announced the resumption of nuclear missile deployment in the western U.S.S.R., a sign of the increased tension in the relationship. The thaw in relations can be taken to begin with Ronald Reagan's January 16, 1984 speech declaring that the U.S. and U.S.S.R. had "common interests and the foremost among them is to avoid war and reduce the level of arms" in which he added that "I support a zero option for all nuclear arms." While the speech was commonly seen as propaganda, Lawrence S. Wittner, professor of history at the State University of New York - Albany says of it that "a number of officials--including its writer, Jack Matlock Jr.--have contended that it was meant to be taken seriously by Soviet leaders." On June 30, 1984, the Soviets offered to start negotiations on nuclear and space-based weapons.

== Gorbachev period ==
Mikhail Gorbachev came to power in the Soviet Union on March 11, 1985, and the next day negotiations on nuclear and space-based weapons began in Geneva. A few weeks later, he proposed a moratorium on the development of nuclear and space weapons during the period of negotiations, and in July, he proposed to ban nuclear testing. Reagan rejected the proposals.

Gorbachev began a period of internal economic restructuring, known as perestroika, and agreed to a series of summits with the American president. Matlock was instrumental in preparing Reagan for his first summit with Gorbachev, arranging for specialists within the government to write a "Soviet Union 101" course of 21 papers on Russia for Reagan to study. Matlock also participated in a mock summit, playing the role of Gorbachev, allowing Reagan to practice the encounter in advance.

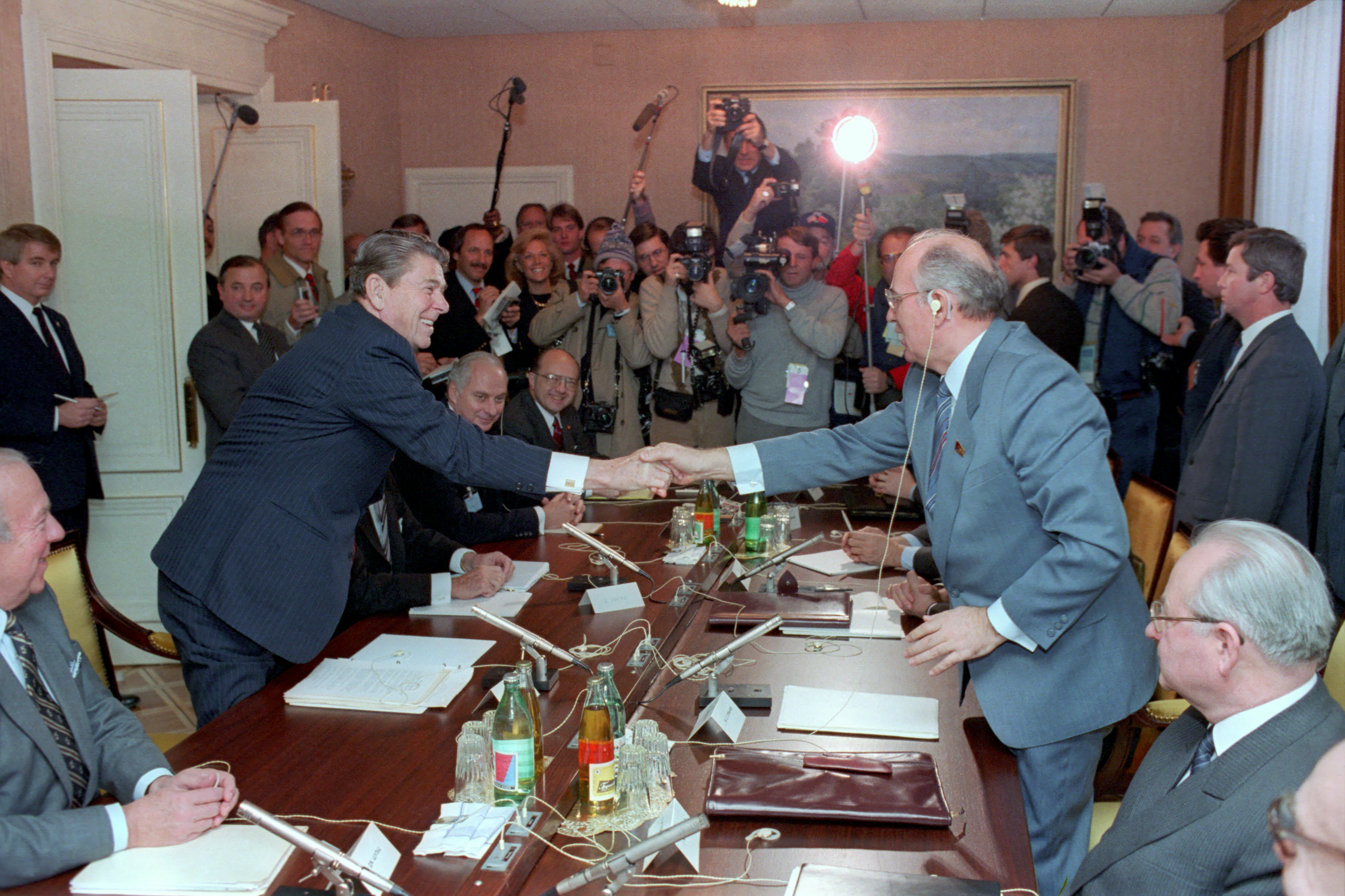
Geneva Summit, with Matlock seated at the far end of the table

'Summit Meetings 1985–91
Leaders	Topic	Venue	Dates	Reference
Reagan - Gorbachev	Geneva Summit	Geneva	November 19–21, 1985	
Reagan - Gorbachev	Iceland Summit	Reykjavík	October 11–12, 1986	
Reagan - Gorbachev	INF Treaty	Washington	December 7–10, 1987	
Reagan - Gorbachev	INF Treaty ratification	Moscow	June 1, 1988	
Reagan - Gorbachev	End of Class Struggle	New York	December 7, 1988	
Bush - Gorbachev	Malta Summit	Malta	December 2–3, 1989	
Bush - Gorbachev	Bilateral Agreements	Washington	May 30-June 3, 1990	
Bush - Gorbachev	Persian Gulf War	Helsinki	September 8–9, 1990	
Bush - Gorbachev	START I Treaty	Moscow	July 31, 1991	

Speaking at a Chautauqua conference in Jūrmala, Latvian SSR in June 1986, Matlock told the crowd that the United States did not recognize the incorporation of the Baltic States into the Soviet Union. His remarks are credited by Dainis Īvāns, leader of the Popular Front of Latvia, with galvanizing the independence movement in Latvia.

U.S.-Soviet relations took a turn for the worse with the Soviet's arrest of U.S. reporter Nicholas Daniloff, evidently for use as a bargaining chip in response to the August 30, 1986 arrest of suspected KGB agent Gennadiy Zakharov. Since Daniloff was not engaged in espionage, Matlock advised taking a hard line with the Soviets. While charges against Daniloff were dropped, a diplomatic row ensued, leading by the end of October, to the expulsion of 100 Soviets, including 80 suspected intelligence officers. The U.S. lost 10 diplomats from Embassy Moscow, along with all 260 of the Russian support staff.

== Moscow: as ambassador ==
In April 1987 Reagan appointed Matlock as ambassador to the Soviet Union. Conditions at the embassy were tense, as Marine Sergeant Clayton Lonetree had been found to have compromised embassy security. Within a few months of the Lonetree scandal, all U.S. intelligence assets in the Soviet Union had been exposed. The Americans suspected that the security breach had meant that the embassy code room was no longer secure and worked frantically to determine how. It was not until 1994 that Aldrich Ames, a mole within the CIA, was caught. Another mole, Robert Hanssen, this time within the FBI, was caught only in 2001.

During 1987, relations improved steadily, with U.S. military inspectors present at Soviet military manoeuvres, an agreement to establish centers on Reducing Nuclear Threat, and a first round of negotiations aimed at banning nuclear tests. The thaw in relations was reflected in the cultural sphere. Matlock's invitation to ballerina Maya Plisetskaya to attend a reception at Spaso House provided a way for Matlock to judge Gorbachev's intentions, as earlier Soviet leaders would have considered it a provocation.

A second embassy fire in February 1988 damaged several floors of the chancery.

Improvements in relations continued during the year, with two summit meetings, the first in Moscow and the second on Governor's Island in New York. An earthquake struck Armenia during the second summit, cutting it short. However, a U.S. offer of assistance to the victims was accepted by Gorbachev, and became the first official assistance by the U.S. since World War II.

The Berlin Wall fell on November 9, 1989, and on November 15, the U.S. and U.S.S.R. submitted a joint resolution to the United Nations on the Consolidation of International Peace, Security and Cooperation, the first such joint initiative. A December meeting in Malta brought Gorbachev and George H. W. Bush together for their first summit.

The June 1990 summit in Washington brought several bilateral agreements, covering chemical weapons, trade, aviation, grain, maritime boundaries, peaceful uses of atomic energy, ocean exploration, student exchanges, and customs cooperation. The September meeting in Helsinki provided a venue for discussion of the Persian Gulf War.

A third fire in the embassy occurred in April 1991, and this time the KGB may have managed to send in agents disguised as firefighters.

In June 1991, Matlock, received word of a coup planned against Gorbachev, and warned him. It was to no avail; shortly after his July summit with Bush and 8 days after the end of Matlock's term, Gorbachev was briefly removed from power by the August 1991 coup.

The Soviet Union collapsed by the end of 1991, just a few months after Matlock, having fulfilled his ambition when he joined the Foreign Service, retired from a diplomatic career spanning 35 years.

== End of the Soviet Union and the Cold War ==
External videos
- Presentation by Matlock on Autopsy on an Empire, November 21, 1995, C-SPAN
- Booknotes interview with Matlock on Reagan and Gorbachev, September 26, 2004, C-SPAN
- After Words interview with Matlock on Superpower Illusions, April 3, 2010, C-SPAN

After retirement from the Foreign Service, Matlock began work on his magnum opus, Autopsy on an Empire: The American Ambassador's Account of the Collapse of the Soviet Union. This 836 page book details the final years of the Soviet Union, and is considered by many to be the definitive insider's guide to the subject.

A subsequent book, Reagan and Gorbachev: How the Cold War Ended describes the relationship of the two men and their efforts to reach agreement on arms reductions between the superpowers. Matlock takes the position that the military build-up by Ronald Reagan in the early-1980s has contributed to the inaccurate characterization of Reagan as a war hawk. The quote atop the first page of Reagan and Gorbachev is by Ronald Reagan, speaking in 1981 during the beginnings of a one trillion dollar defense spending surge, that states "I've always recognized that ultimately there's got to be a settlement, a solution."

Reagan, according to Matlock, never altered from his goals as annunciated at his first press conference as president when he stated that, appearances to the contrary, he was in favor of "an actual reduction in the numbers of nuclear weapons." This would contradict the claims of Reagan-victory-school proponents such as Peter Schweitzer.

His third book, Superpower Illusions: How Myths and False Ideologies Led America Astray--And How to Return to Reality, published in 2010, provides an analysis of the post Cold War period along with his policy prescriptions.

== Teaching diplomacy ==
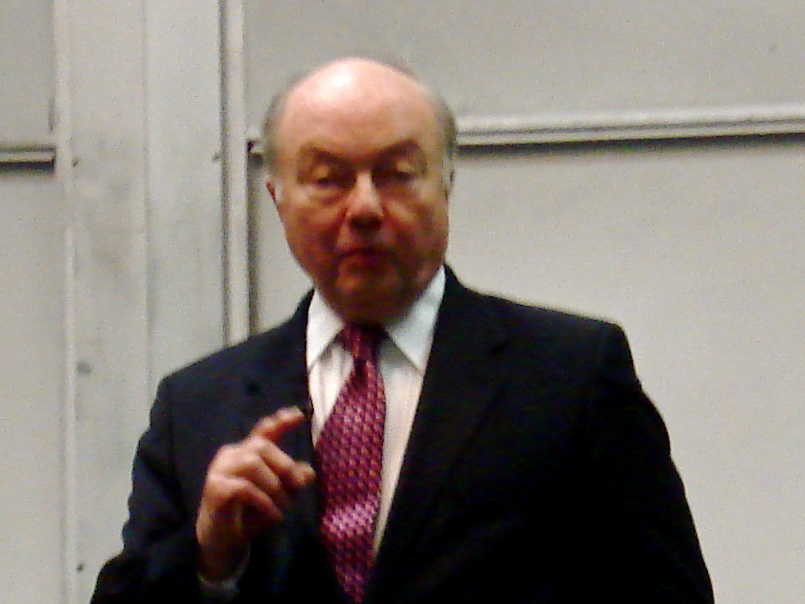
Matlock speaking at UCLA in November 2007

Matlock has taught diplomacy at Duke University, Princeton University, Columbia University and Hamilton College. In a 1997 interview, Matlock offers some advice to prospective diplomats: have an optimistic nature, get a liberal education, do not expect to change the world, know the country, know your own country, faithfully represent your government, find the mutual interests, and remember that timing is everything.

Matlock also gives his views on one of the basic distinctions in politics:

I don't see much difference between a communist regime and a fascist regime. In fact, I think one of the greatest intellectual confusions that many have had over these decades is the whole right and left thing -- fascists are on the right, communists are on the left. Nonsense! They come together and overlap, and we're seeing this in Russia today where the allies are the nationalistic chauvinists and the communists. They are natural allies because they are authoritarians by nature. And more than authoritarians, they tend to be totalitarians, which means that they tend to destroy all of the elements of the civil society. To me that's much more important than whether you're philosophically right or left. You know, are you willing to create and live in a civil society, in an open society, or not? That to me is the basic issue.

== U.S. policy and politics ==
Since leaving government service, Matlock has occasionally joined with other experts to criticize U.S. foreign policy. On June 26, 1997, he signed an Open Letter to President Bill Clinton criticizing plans for NATO expansion. His reason for opposition, as given in testimony before the Senate Foreign Relations Committee, was his belief that NATO expansion would preclude significant nuclear arms reduction with Russia, and consequently increase the risk of a nuclear attack by terrorists.

Matlock drew the ire of many Republicans during the 2004 presidential election campaign when he signed the Official Statement of Diplomats and Military Commanders for Change, which criticized the policies of President George W. Bush and endorsed Senator John Kerry for president.

On Jan 4, 2007, Matlock joined with George Shultz, William Perry, Henry Kissinger and Sam Nunn to advocate a goal of a world free of nuclear weapons. On 23 September 2008 after a two-day conference at the Carnegie Endowment for International Peace, he joined several other former ambassadors to issue a joint statement on how Russia and the United States might move forward in their relations. He has endorsed the Global Zero Initiative, a plan to eliminate all nuclear weapons by 2030. Matlock has also signed an open letter of May 13, 2011 asking the implementors of the New START treaty between the U.S. Russia to make public the locations and aggregate numbers of nuclear weapons, in order to promote transparency and reduce mistrust.

On Jan 18, 2011 he co-signed an open letter to President Obama urging a United Nations resolution condemning Israeli settlements in the occupied territory.

== Russo-Ukrainian War ==
Matlock was surprised by the Russian invasion of Ukraine in February, 2022, and thought that it could have been avoided if the United States had not advocated for the admission of Ukraine into NATO. He sees the current policy as an abandonment of a commitment not to expand NATO, which he says was made to Gorbachev. In late 2021, he argued that Ukraine is a state but not yet a nation, because of its deep ethnolinguistic divisions, saying it "has not yet found a leader who can unite its citizens in a shared concept of Ukrainian identity. [....] it is not Russian interference that created Ukrainian disunity but rather the haphazard way the country was assembled from parts that were not always mutually compatible [...], not by Ukrainians themselves but by outsiders." This lead the Atlantic Council to describe him as an apologist for Russian imperialism in Ukraine. On Jan 26, 2022 he published a review of Richard Sakwa's article "Whisper it, but Putin has a point in Ukraine" on his personal blog, stating agreement that Russia desires a neutral Ukraine and pushing back against claims that Russia seeks to annex Ukraine. On Feb 15, 2022, he published an op-ed in Antiwar.com, originally written for the American Committee for US-Russia Accord (of which he is one of the directors), suggesting an impending Russian invasion of Ukraine might be a "charade", stating "Maybe I am wrong – tragically wrong – but I cannot dismiss the suspicion that we are witnessing an elaborate charade, grossly magnified by prominent elements of the American media, to serve a domestic political end."

Having witnessed the Cuban Missile Crisis of 1962 from the inside the American Embassy in Moscow, he was acutely aware of the potential dangers of seeming to threaten the security and even the identity of a nuclear-armed state. He also warned that the war endangers progress on other pressing international issues such as the climate or refugee crisis. He considered the war aims on both sides of the conflict to be unrealistic and urged a cease-fire and diplomatic settlement that would end the loss of Ukrainian and Russian lives and destruction of property in much of Ukraine. He has suggested that the U.S. could encourage negotiations by using its leverage as the largest arms supplier to Ukraine as well as the principal sponsor of sanctions on Russia. Matlock writes:

What all the parties to the conflict in Ukraine seem to have forgotten is that the future of mankind will not be determined by where international borders are drawn — these have never been static in history and doubtless will continue to change from time to time. The future of mankind will be determined by whether nations learn to settle their differences peacefully.

In December 2021, Matlock wrote:

Interference by the United States and its NATO allies in Ukraine’s civil struggle has exacerbated the crisis within Ukraine, undermined the possibility of bringing the two easternmost provinces back under Kyiv’s control, and raised the specter of possible conflict between nuclear-armed powers. Furthermore, in denying that Russia has a "right" to oppose extension of a hostile military alliance to its national borders, the United States ignores its own history of declaring and enforcing for two centuries a sphere of influence in the Western hemisphere.

== Published works ==
1. The function of the "governing organs" of the Union of Soviet writers (1934–1950) OCLC 56176736 Columbia University Masters Thesis (1952)
2. An index to the collected works of J. V. Stalin External Research Staff, Office of Intelligence Research, Dept. of State, (1955); reprinted by Johnson Reprint Corp ASIN B0006CV1AA (1971); Russian edition by Nendeln, Liechtenstein, Kraus Reprint, OCLC 30135390 (1973)
3. Soviet strategy and tactics in tropical Africa OCLC 1658097 Oberammergau : U.S. Army Field Detachment "R", Office of the Assistant Chief of Staff, Intelligence Dept. of the Army, the Army's Institute of Advanced Russian Studies (1961)
4. U.S.-Soviet relations : background and prospects OCLC 15103643 Washington, D.C. : U.S. Dept. of State, Bureau of Public Affairs, Office of Public Communication (1986)
5. U.S.-Soviet relations : status and prospects OCLC 83571255 Studia diplomatica. - 39(6) 1986 : 635-648
6. The Czechoslovak National Council of America, Chicago District, proudly presents its thirty-eighth annual ball OCLC 49382326 The Czechoslovak National Council of America (January 21, 1989)
7. Autopsy on an Empire: The American Ambassador's Account of the Collapse of the Soviet Union Random House ISBN 0-679-41376-6 (1995); Russian edition ISBN 5-7380-0214-8 (1995); Chinese edition ISBN 7-5012-0787-9 (1996)
8. The Chechen Tragedy, The New York Review of Books (February 16, 1995)
9. Russia: The Power of the Mob, The New York Review of Books (July 13, 1995)
10. The Go-Between, The New York Review of Books (February 1, 1996)
11. The Russian Prospect, The New York Review of Books (February 29, 1996)
12. The Chechen Conflict and Russian Democratic Development Testimony before the Commission on Security and Cooperation in Europe (March 6, 1996)
13. Dealing with a Russia in Turmoil: The Future of Partnership Foreign Affairs (May/June 1996)
14. The Struggle for the Kremlin, The New York Review of Books (August 8, 1996)
15. 'Struggle for the Kremlin': An Exchange, The New York Review of Books (September 19, 1996)
16. Gorbachev: Lingering Mysteries, The New York Review of Books (December 19, 1996)
17. 'The Gorbachev Factor': An Exchange, The New York Review of Books (March 27, 1997)
18. Gorbachev & the Coup: An Exchange, The New York Review of Books (June 26, 1997)
19. Success Story, The New York Review of Books (September 25, 1997)
20. Testimony to the Senate Foreign Relations Committee NATO Expansion And the International Coalition in Europe (October 30, 1997)
21. Russia's Leaking Nukes, The New York Review of Books (February 5, 1998)
22. It's a Bad Idea; Vote Against It The Great NATO Debate, Center for War, Peace, and the News Media of New York University and MSNBC.com (March 3, 1998)
23. Too Many Arms to Twist New York Times, OpEd Page (March 22, 1998)
24. Chinese Checkers New York Times, Book Section (September 13, 1998)
25. The Poor Neighbor New York Times, Book Section (April 11, 1999)
26. The One Place NATO Could Turn for Help New York Times, OpEd Page (April 20, 1999)
27. Why Were We in Vietnam? New York Times, Books Section (August 8, 1999)
28. Can Civilizations Clash? American Philosophical Society Proceedings vol. 143, 3 (September, 1999)
29. The Dreamer: The World According to Gorbachev Foreign Affairs (January/February 2000)
30. The Nowhere Nation, The New York Review of Books (February 24, 2000)
31. Russia Votes: Will Democracy Win? New York Times, OpEd Page (March 26, 2000)
32. Policing the World New York Times, Books Section (March 26, 2000)
33. 'Ukraine Today', The New York Review of Books (April 13, 2000)
34. Security: The Bottom Line Arms Control Today (October, 2000)
35. Read Their Lips New York Times, Book Section (August 12, 2001)
36. Dmitri Sergeyevich Likhachev American Philosophical Society Proceedings vol. 145, 3 (September, 2001)
37. The End of the Cold War: Rethinking the Origin and Conclusion of the US-Soviet Conflict Harvard International Review Vol. 23 (3) (Fall 2001)
38. The War We Face, Reflections NTI Research Library (October 15, 2001)
39. Nadezhda Mandel’shtam on the Russian Language ISSN 0036-0341 OCLC 90621976 Russian Review, 61, no. 4 (2002): 503-504
40. Deterring the Undeterrable New York Times, Books Section (October 20, 2002)
41. Reagan and Gorbachev: How the Cold War Ended Random House ISBN 0-679-46323-2 (2004)
42. It Takes a Global Village New York Times, Books Section (March 21, 2004)
43. Western Intelligence and the Collapse of the Soviet Union, 1980–1990: Ten Years That Did Not Shake the World (review) Journal of Cold War Studies - Volume 6, Number 2, Spring 2004, pp. 99–101
44. Putin 'Made a Big Mistake' Interfering in Ukraine Politics Council on Foreign Relations, Interview by Bernard Gwertzman (December 6, 2004)
45. On the Battlefields of the Cold War: A Soviet Ambassador's Confession (review) The Russian Review ISSN 0036-0341, Volume 64, Number 1, (January 2005), 163–164.
46. Boris Yeltsin, the Early Years New York Times, Opinion Section, (April 24, 2007)
47. Superpower Illusions: How Myths and False Ideologies Led America Astray—And How to Return to Reality Yale University Press ISBN 0-300-13761-3 (January 5, 2010)

== Multimedia ==
1. Jennings, Peter, Jack Matlock, former Ambassador to the Soviet Union, tells reporters about the appointments and decisions which Gorbachev has made in his first day back from his three-day exile by an unsuccessful coup d'etat OCLC: 24821960 (audio) (1991)
2. Ellison, Herbert J. and Wolf, Daniel, Messengers from Moscow debating the issues OCLC: 35243903 Beverly Hills, CA: Pacem Distribution International (video) (1996)
3. Kreisler, Harry, The Collapse of the Soviet Union and the End of the Cold War: A Diplomat Looks Back (video) (Feb 13, 1997)
4. Rose, Charlie, Charlie Rose with Stephen Cohen, Jack Matlock & Steven Solnick; Joyce Maynard on YouTube (video) (Sep 8, 1998)
5. Lopate, Leonard, Jack F. Matlock discusses his new book: Reagan and Gorbachev: How the Cold War Ended National Public Radio (audio) (August 2, 2004)
6. Matlock, Jack F., Where is Putin’s Russia Going? World Affairs Councils of America (video) (January 20, 2006)
7. World Affairs Council, Amb. Jack Matlock at WACA 2006 (video) (Feb 26, 2006)
8. World Affairs Council, Living with Vladimir Putin's Russia (video) (May 1, 2006)
9. Rose, Charlie, The Death of Alexander Litvinenko (video) (Dec 5, 2006)
10. Reese, James, Columbia University Forum - Where Is Russia Headed? (audio) (May 15, 2007)
11. World Affairs Council of Connecticut, Russia and the United States (video) (Oct 10, 2007)
12. Hoover Institution, Regional Confrontations and Nuclear Proliferation (video) (Oct 25, 2007)
13. UCLA International Institute, Living With Russia (audio) (Nov 19, 2007)
14. Matlock, Jack, Living with Vladimir Putin's Russia (video) (Dec 5, 2007)
15. Miller Center of Public Affairs, Ambassador William C. Battle Symposium on American Diplomacy: 200 Years of Russian-American Diplomatic Relations (video) (Jan 22, 2008)
16. Council on Foreign Relations, Russia Update (video) (Feb 22, 2008)
17. Speedie, David C. David Speedie Interviews Jack Matlock (video) (July 18, 2008)
18. Bloomberg. Night Talk: An Interview With Amb. Jack Matlock on YouTube (video) (August 19, 2008)
19. Carnegie Endowment for International Peace. U.S. Russia Relations, The Longer View (video) (Sep 23, 2008)
20. Woodrow Wilson School, Princeton University, Adlai Stevenson's Lasting Legacy on YouTube (video) (Sep 24, 2008)
21. University of California Irvine School of Social Sciences, Center for Global Peace and Conflict Studies, Ending the Cold War 20 Years Ago: Lessons for Today (video) (Mar 9, 2010)
22. University of Edinburgh, The Ukrainian Crisis: Reflections on Power in Today's World (video) (Jun 15, 2015)
23. CIVILNET, Jack Matlock: The End and the Beginning (video) (May 24, 2017)
24. TEDxNCSSM, The Nuclear Threat (video) (Jan 31, 2018)
25. Monterey Initiative in Russian Studies, Jack F. Matlock | Ambassador to the Soviet Union, 1987-1991 (video) (Dec 9, 2020)
26. Democracy Now!, Ex-U.S. Ambassador to USSR: Ukraine Crisis Stems Directly from Post-Cold War Push to Expand NATO (video) (Feb 17, 2022)
27. KrasnoUNC, Reflections on Gorbachev (video) (Sep 1, 2022)

== Notes ==
Diplomatic posts
Preceded by Francis J. Meehan	United States ambassador to Czechoslovakia; 1981–1983	Succeeded by William H. Luers
Preceded by Arthur A. Hartman	United States ambassador to the Soviet Union; 1987–1991	Succeeded by Robert S. Strauss
