= Geneva Summit (1985) =

Meeting of Ronald Reagan and Mikhail Gorbachev

Coordinates: 46.29009°N 6.16705°E

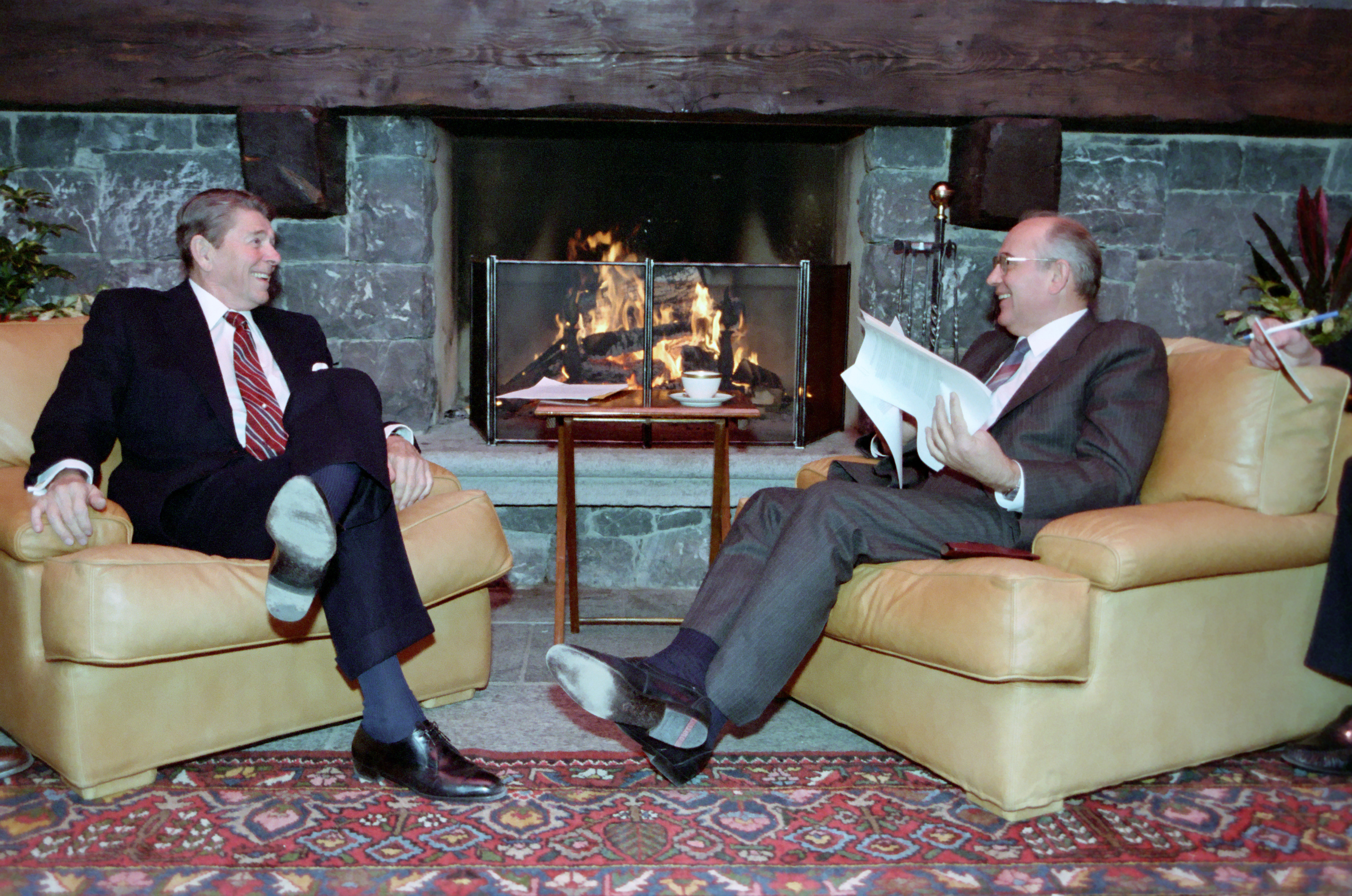
- Reagan and Gorbachev at the Geneva Summit
- Host country: Switzerland
- Dates: November 19–21, 1985 (40 years ago)
- Cities: Geneva
- Venues: Villa Fleur d'Eau; Soviet Mission; Maison de Saussure; International Conference Center (CICG)
- Participants: (Soviet Union) Mikhail Gorbachev (United States) Ronald Reagan
- Follows: Vienna Summit (1979)
- Precedes: Reykjavík Summit (1986)

The Geneva Summit of 1985 was a Cold War-era meeting in Geneva, Switzerland. It was held on November 19–21, 1985, between U.S. president Ronald Reagan and Soviet general secretary Mikhail Gorbachev. The two leaders met for the first time to hold talks on international diplomatic relations and the arms race.

== Leadup to the summit ==
After Gorbachev became general secretary in March 1985, only two months elapsed before the first mentions were made of a possible summit between Reagan and Gorbachev. While meeting with Secretary of State George Shultz in Vienna in May 1985, Soviet Foreign Minister Andrei Gromyko approached Shultz discreetly asking to begin the process of planning for the two leaders to meet. Subsequent discussion over the following months established possible topics for negotiation. As to the location, Reagan had wanted Gorbachev to select Washington, D.C. as the site for the summit, arguing that it was the Soviets' turn to come to the United States, since two previous American presidents, Nixon and Ford, both went to the Soviet Union in 1974. Gorbachev instead preferred a neutral site, so the city of Geneva was agreed upon sometime in June 1985.

Reagan's advisors Bud McFarlane and Jack Matlock in preparation for the summit had identified weaknesses in Reagan's understanding of the Soviet Union, as Reagan "still tended to base many of his judgments more on generalities, even slogans, than on a nuanced understanding of Soviet reality." Beginning in June 1985, a series of papers were written for him, "organized to give Reagan a rounded picture of the country and its people".

In July 1985, the White House summit advance team identified two possible residences in Geneva for the Reagans to reside in during their stay, but Nancy Reagan vetoed the first choice. After consulting with the astrologer Joan Quigley, Nancy Reagan insisted on Maison de Saussure, the same residence President Eisenhower used during his stay at the Geneva Summit of 1955.

== Meeting schedule ==
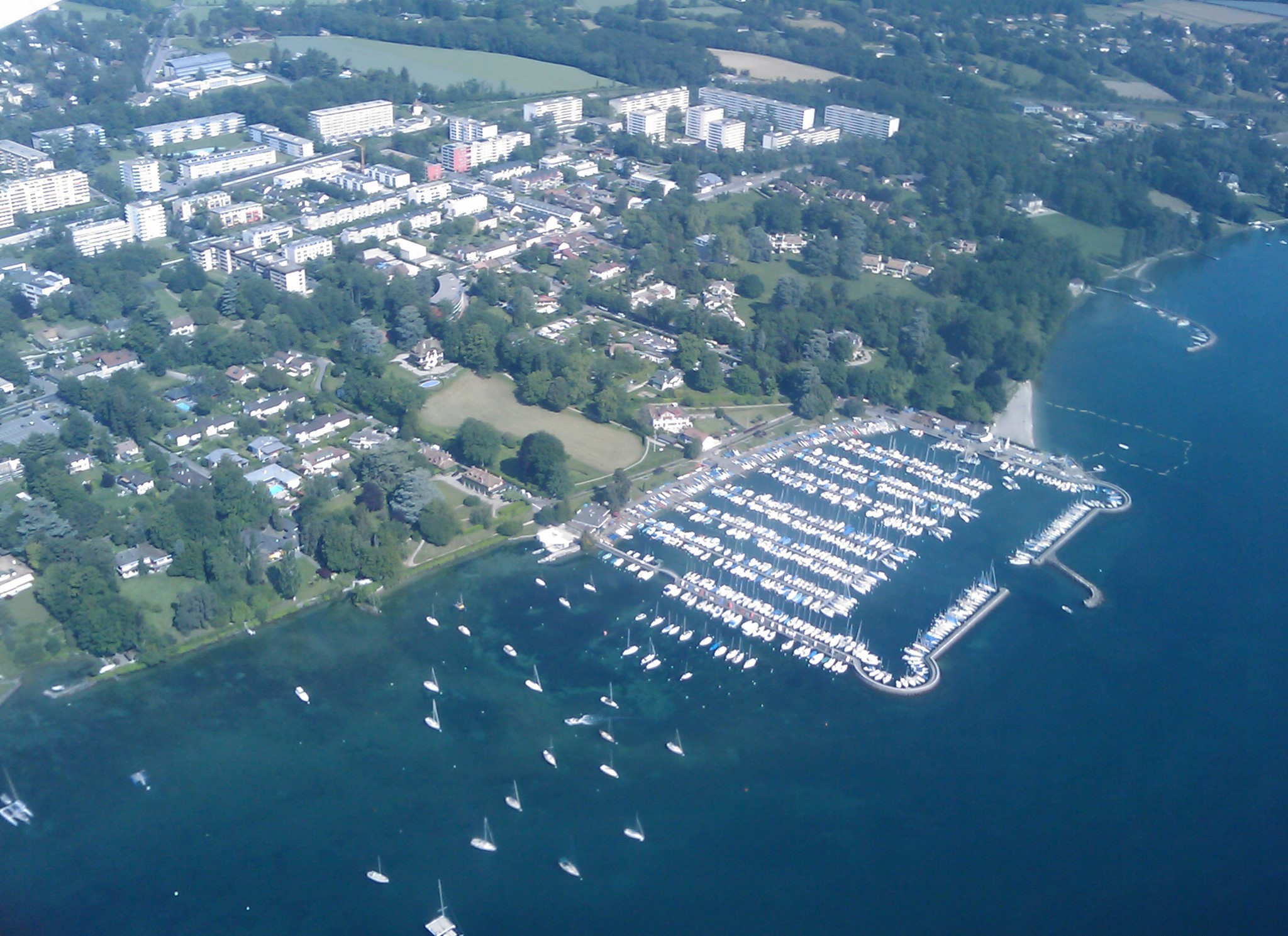
The Versoix municipality as it appears on the north-west shore of Lake Geneva. Villa Fleur d'Eau, where the principal meetings of the first day were held, is circled.

Reagan was convinced that the personal assessments he and Gorbachev would make of each other at their meetings would be crucial to the outcome of the summit. It was Reagan's understanding that the 1961 Vienna Summit between President Kennedy and Nikita Khrushchev failed due to a lack of chemistry between the two leaders, where Khrushchev "walked over Kennedy and Kennedy knew it". In order to foster a more personable environment, the Geneva summit was structured with the first two days consisting of a series of private meetings with only Reagan and Gorbachev present (and their interpreters) interspersed with a series of plenary meetings with Reagan and Gorbachev accompanied by their major advisors. A third day consisting of a concluding joint press conference and signing ceremony was also scheduled. Each day's events occurred at different locations in and around Geneva:

November 19 Fleur d'Eau	November 20 Soviet Mission	November 21 CICG
First private meeting, 60 min; First plenary meeting, 48 min; Second plenary meeting, 70 min; Second private meeting, 65 min; Dinner hosted by the Gorbachevs at the Soviet Mission, 150 min	Third private meeting, 70 min; Third plenary meeting, 70 min; Fourth plenary meeting, 45 min; Diplomatic reception at La Gandole, 40 min; Dinner hosted by the Reagans at Maison de Saussure, 150 min	Joint press conference; Signing ceremony

Having departed Andrews AFB on Air Force One at 8:35 in the morning—the exact time suggested by the astrologer Quigley—President Reagan arrived in Geneva ahead of the summit on the evening of November 16, 1985. The next day, Reagan and his retinue toured the grounds of Fleur d'Eau, the villa in Versoix where the first day's meetings were to take place. On November 18, Reagan was officially received by Swiss president Kurt Furgler at Le Reposoir.

== First day ==
=== First private meeting ===
When Reagan emerged outside Fleur d'Eau without his coat for his first meeting with Gorbachev, commentators took it as a sign of Reagan’s vitality.

On November 19, 1985, Reagan and Gorbachev met for the first time at Fleur d'Eau. When the Soviet motorcade deposited Gorbachev at the driveway of Fleur d'Eau's eastern facade, Reagan emerged from the villa without his coat to greet him. Commentators later contrasted the image of Reagan in a blue suit next to Gorbachev in an overcoat, seemingly as a sign of Reagan’s vitality. Reagan had been wearing an overcoat and scarf, but was urged by his personal aide, Jim Kuhn, to take them off for appearance’s sake.

Gorbachev later said: "We viewed the Geneva meeting realistically, without grand expectations, yet we hoped to lay the foundations for a serious dialogue in the future". Reagan's goal was to convince Gorbachev that America desired peace above all else. Reagan described his hopes for the summit as a "mission for peace". The first thing Reagan said to Gorbachev was "The United States and the Soviet Union are the two greatest countries on Earth, the superpowers. They are the only ones who can start World War 3, but also the only two countries that could bring peace to the world". He then emphasized the personal similarities between the two leaders, with both being born in similar "rural hamlets in the middle of their respective countries" and the great responsibilities they held.

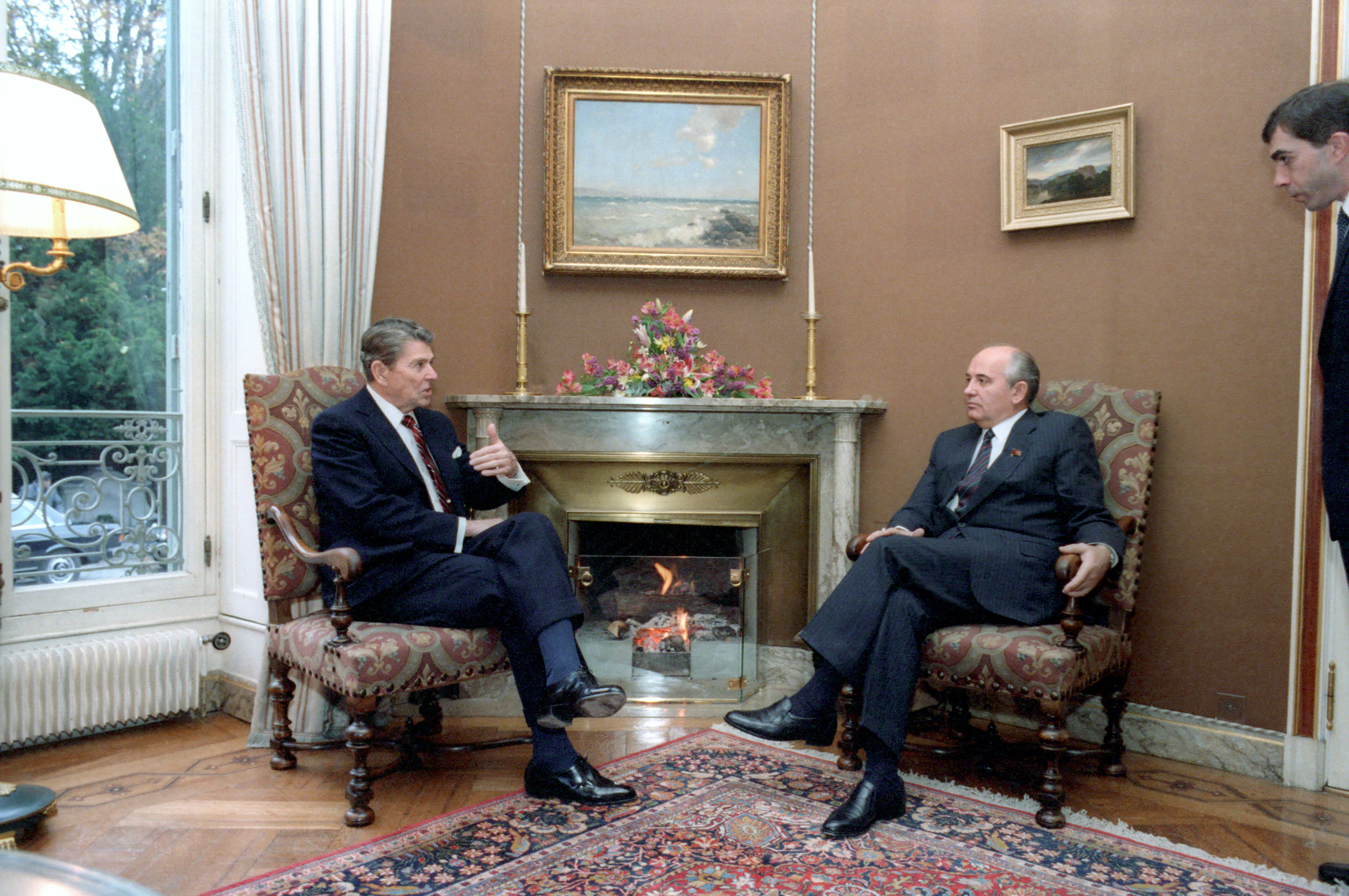
Reagan and Gorbachev during their first private meeting, which exceeded its scheduled time by 45 minutes (Note: The tentative summit schedule prepared by William Henkel and submitted on October 9, 1985, to Dennis Thomas and White House Chief of Staff Don Regan for their approval shows Reagan and Gorbachev's first private meeting allotted an initial timespan of 15 minutes. When actually held, the meeting ended up lasting for one hour.)

During their first private meeting, Gorbachev told Reagan of information he had received from the Soviet Academy of Sciences, specifically the Institute for Earth Studies, where the scientists had become convinced that there would be a major earthquake in an area of California and Nevada by 1988. This forecast was based on a computer analysis of patterns of seismicity worldwide. Reagan replied that he realized that such an earthquake was considered to be overdue. (Note: In 1988, the head of the Soviet team that developed the Institute for Earth Studies' forecast, Vladimir Keilis-Borok, was invited to the National Earthquake Prediction Evaluation Council to present a modified version of the probability forecast Gorbachev had given to Reagan. Keilis-Borok extended the time window of that forecast from the end of 1988 to mid-1992 and restricted the area to a more limited region of central and southern California, an area that included the site and date of the future 1989 Loma Prieta earthquake.)

According to Secretary of State George Shultz, Reagan and Gorbachev's first private meeting exceeded its scheduled time by "over a half an hour". After being urged by White House Chief of Staff Don Regan to intervene, Reagan's personal aide Jim Kuhn asked Shultz whether he should interrupt the meeting. Shultz replied, "If you think so, then you shouldn't have this job". Despite melodramatically rebuking Kuhn, the actual reason for the meeting going past its scheduled time was likely more prosaic than Shultz imagined. While Reagan and Gorbachev's plenary meetings all featured simultaneous translation, their private meetings instead featured consecutive translation—a mode of interpretation which, by its very nature, tends to double the time spent on communication—rendering the first meeting's initial time allotment of 15 minutes as unrealistic.

=== Second private meeting ===
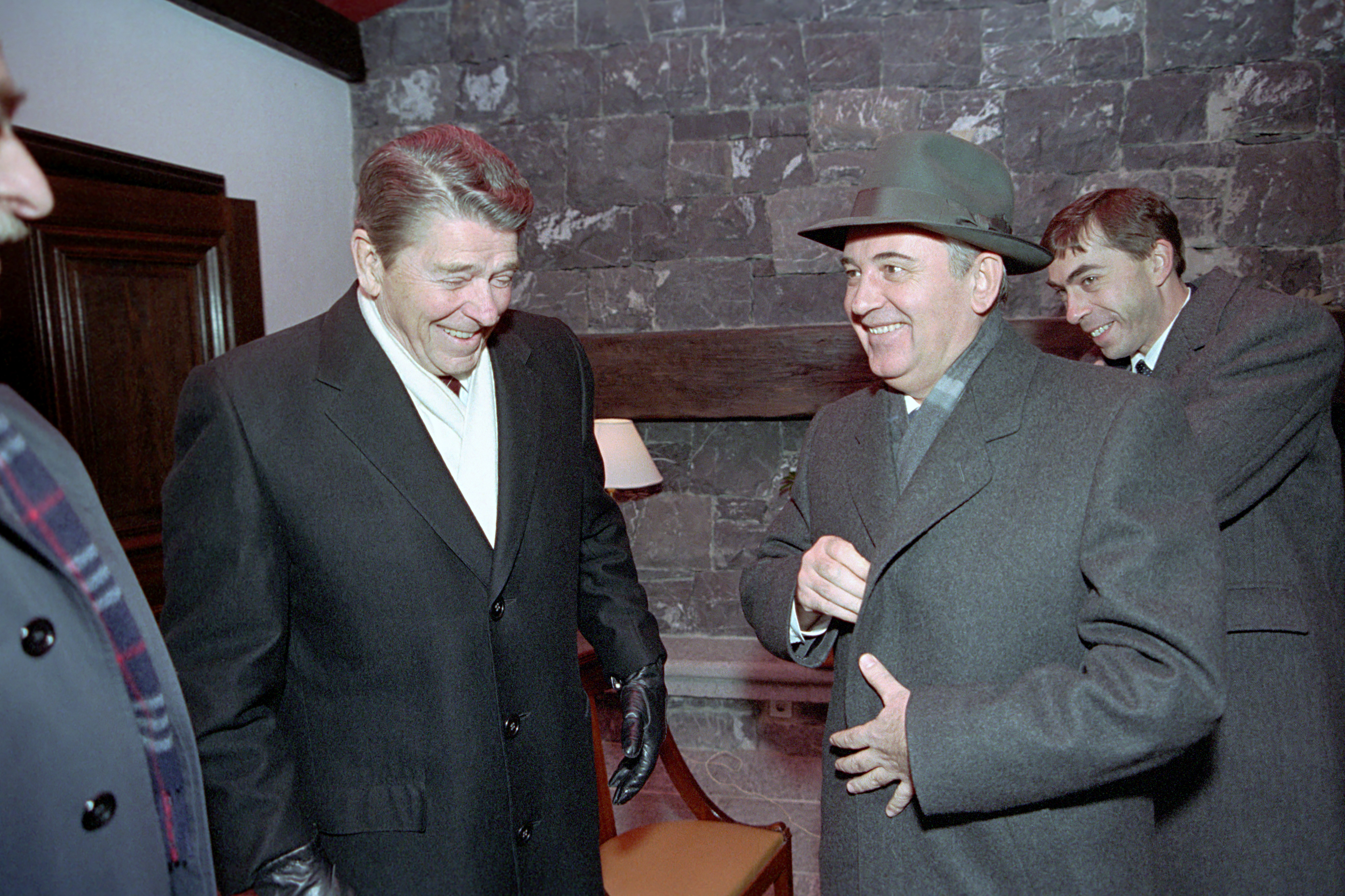
Reagan and Gorbachev at Fleur d'Eau's pool house, (Note: The pool house is alternately referred to in various media as Fleur d'Eau's boat house. Gorbachev called it the "fireside house" in a 2009 interview.) where Reagan notably raised the topic of an imagined alien invasion as eliciting a shared sense of togetherness between their two countries (Note: The official record of conversations at the summit shows Reagan returning to the topic of aliens during an impromptu toast at the dinner hosted by the Gorbachevs, when Reagan mentioned recalling his earlier conversation at the pool house with Gorbachev to Foreign Minister Shevardnadze, where he remarked how "if the people of the world were to find out that there was some alien life form that was going to attack the Earth approaching on Halley’s Comet, then that knowledge would unite all the peoples of the world." Reagan's vision of humanity united by an alien invasion was mentioned by him again two years after the Geneva Summit, during a speech at the 42nd Session of the United Nations General Assembly, where Reagan stated how "we often forget how much unites all the members of humanity ... perhaps we need some outside, universal threat to make us recognize this common bond. I occasionally think how quickly our differences worldwide would vanish if we were facing an alien threat from outside this world. And yet, I ask you, is not an alien force already among us? What could be more alien to the universal aspirations of our peoples than war and the threat of war?" Reagan's interest in science fiction, and the mixed reactions to it he received, were later described by author Gregory Benford and Reagan biographer Lou Cannon.)

Reagan and Gorbachev's second private meeting was held at Fleur d'Eau's pool house, where a fireplace provided the backdrop to a seated Reagan and Gorbachev, leading some to call Geneva's summit the "fireside summit".

Speaking with a group of Maryland high school students shortly after the summit about his second private meeting with Gorbachev, Reagan disclosed that he had discussed the topic of an alien invasion, saying, "I couldn't help but say to him, just think how easy his task and mine might be if suddenly there was a threat to this world from some other species from another planet outside in the universe." Reagan explained that his remarks to Gorbachev were meant to further a sense of togetherness, as "we'd forget all the little local differences that we have between our two countries, and we would find out once and for all that we really are all human beings here on this Earth together", adding that "I don't suppose we can wait for some alien race to come down and threaten us, but I think that between us, we can bring about that realization." In a 2009 interview, Gorbachev confirmed that during their second private meeting Reagan had asked if the Soviet Union would help if the U.S. was invaded by aliens from space. Gorbachev said yes, and that Reagan said, "we would too".

Reagan also presented to Gorbachev at their second private meeting two pages of nine separate arms control deals which Gorbachev took to be a package deal, a "take it or leave it" proposition. Gorbachev indicated that the items on their face were not acceptable. While the walk to the pool house was spent talking about Reagan's films, the walk back from the pool house saw Reagan and Gorbachev agreeing to continue to meet at further summits.

== Second day ==
=== Strategic Defense Initiative ===
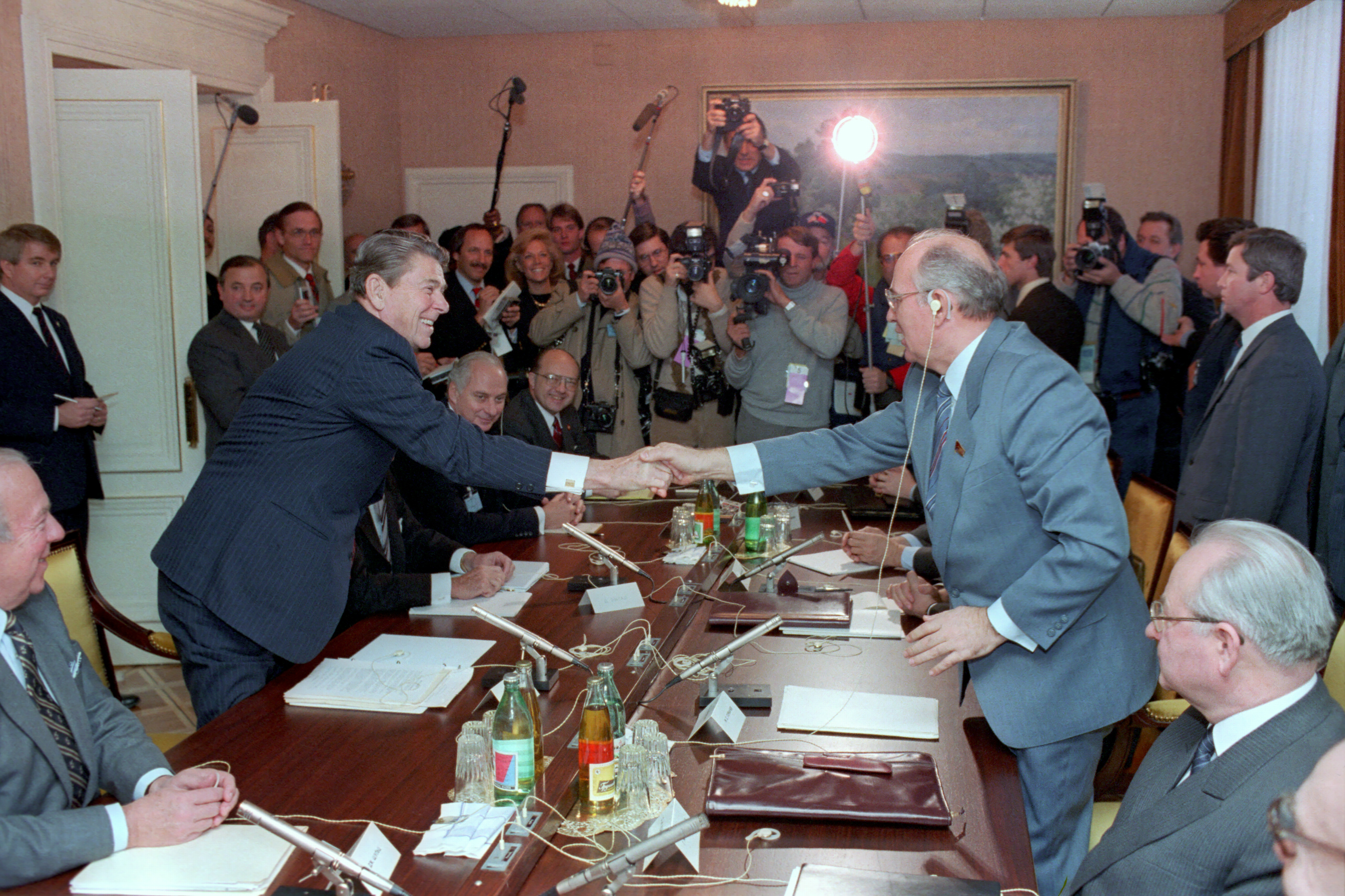
Reagan and Gorbachev during a plenary meeting at the Soviet Mission on November 20, 1985

On November 20, 1985, Reagan and Gorbachev began their second day of meetings, this time at Geneva's Soviet Mission. The main focus of the third plenary meeting held there was the Strategic Defense Initiative, with Gorbachev insisting that SDI represented a new phase of the arms buildup in space and Reagan insisting that SDI was merely "a shield" against ICBMs. Reagan replied that, where Gorbachev saw a threat, "we saw an opportunity", and that both sides first ought to be seeking to reduce offensive arms by 50 percent, since the US would ultimately not "miss the opportunity to develop a defense because of fear that it might have an offensive potential".

=== Human rights ===
Members of the Reagan Administration were said to have privately lamented what they considered to be an insufficient focus on human rights issues at the summit. Reagan stressed in interviews before the summit that he would deal with that issue privately with Gorbachev, on the grounds that he had decided the best way to deal with it was through "quiet diplomacy".

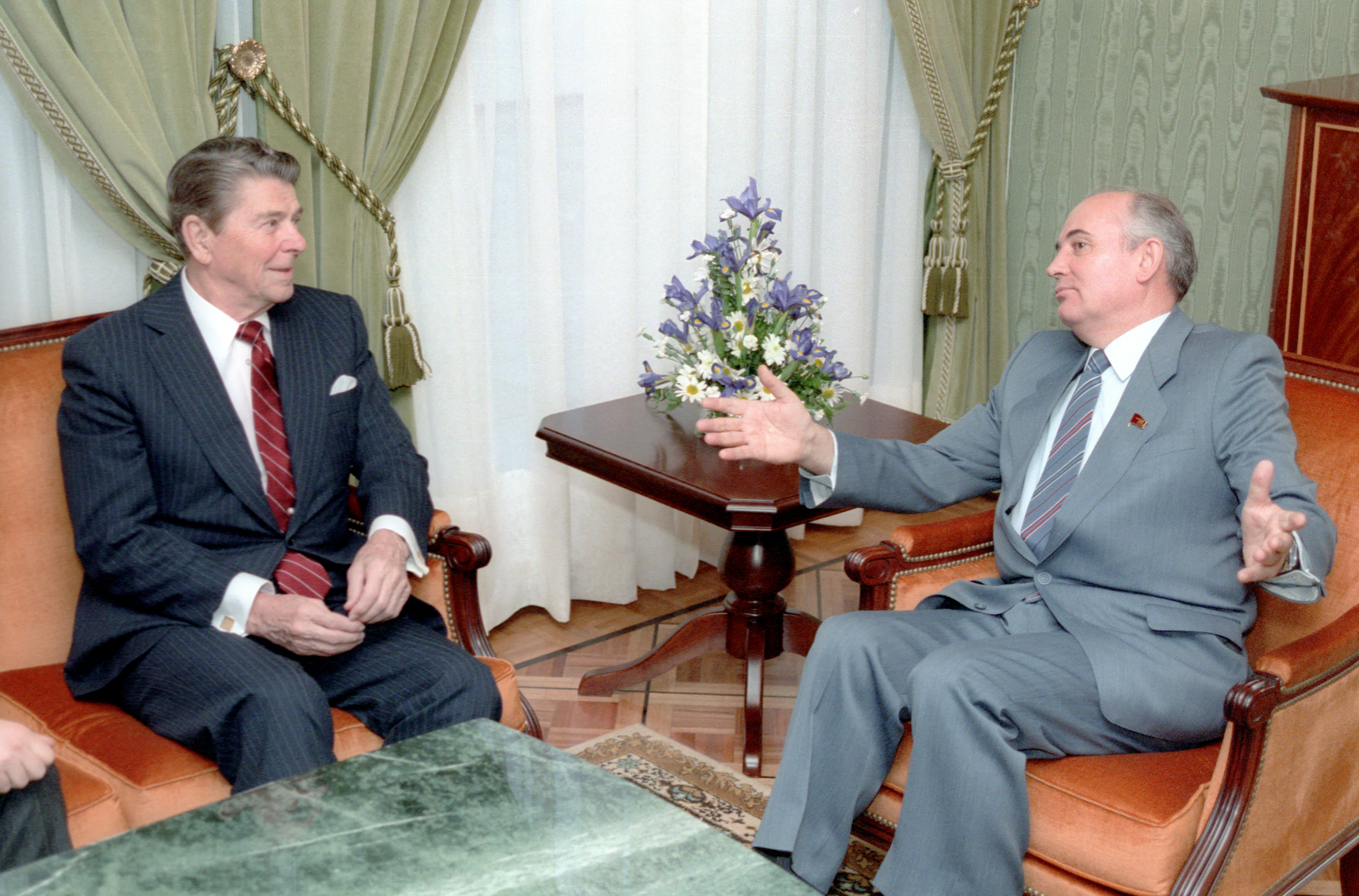
Reagan and Gorbachev during their third private meeting, held at the Soviet Mission on November 20, 1985

Much of Reagan and Gorbachev's third private meeting at the Soviet Mission was spent on the subject of human rights, with Reagan focusing on "the desire of Soviet Jews to emigrate to Israel", because of the "large Jewish community in the U.S., which had an influence on Congress". Reagan emphasized that "we would express our appreciation for what was done [on emigration]", reiterating that there would be "no hint that this was done as a result of U.S. efforts". Reagan stated that handling emigration in this manner "would make it easier for the President to do the type of things which the two countries could do together, such as in the area of trade, for which the President needed Congressional support". Gorbachev countered by stating his belief that the issue of human rights was "being used for political purposes, not only by representatives of various political organizations which were anti-Soviet, but also by officials of the U.S. Administration, including the President." Gorbachev stated that "the fate of Jewish people was of concern to the Soviet government", adding that "after what the Fascists had done to the Jews, the Soviet Union had done everything it could to give them special attention, and it had not regretted doing so."

Gorbachev mentioned what he saw as examples of personal discrimination occurring in the United States, to which Reagan stated that "there were individuals, perhaps employers in factories, with personal prejudices about hiring women, blacks, and so on", but that according to the law, "there can be no discrimination".

=== Don Regan's Washington Post interview ===
As if to underline Gorbachev's mention of discrimination in the United States, White House Chief of Staff Don Regan courted controversy when an interview he gave on the eve of the summit to the Washington Post brought fresh condemnation on the summit's second day from the media and American politicians such as Patricia Schroeder and Bella Abzug. Regan had said that news coverage of the American and Soviet first ladies' interactions during the summit would have particular appeal to women because women would not understand the summit’s political, diplomatic and military intricacies, saying "they’re not ... going to understand throw-weights or what is happening in Afghanistan or what is happening in human rights", adding that "some women will, but most women—believe me, your readers for the most part if you took a poll—would rather read the human interest stuff of what happened".

Reagan and Gorbachev were both asked to comment on Regan’s remarks as they entered the Soviet Mission on the second day of the summit. Reagan said of Regan, "I don’t think he meant it in that way at all. I think he was trying to say they are interested in other things as well, in the entire human view", while Gorbachev replied that "both men and women in the United States and the Soviet Union and all over the world are interested in having peace for themselves and being sure that this peace would become stable and lasting for the future. ... And to that end, they are interested in the reduction in the numbers of weapons."

=== Dispute over final communique ===
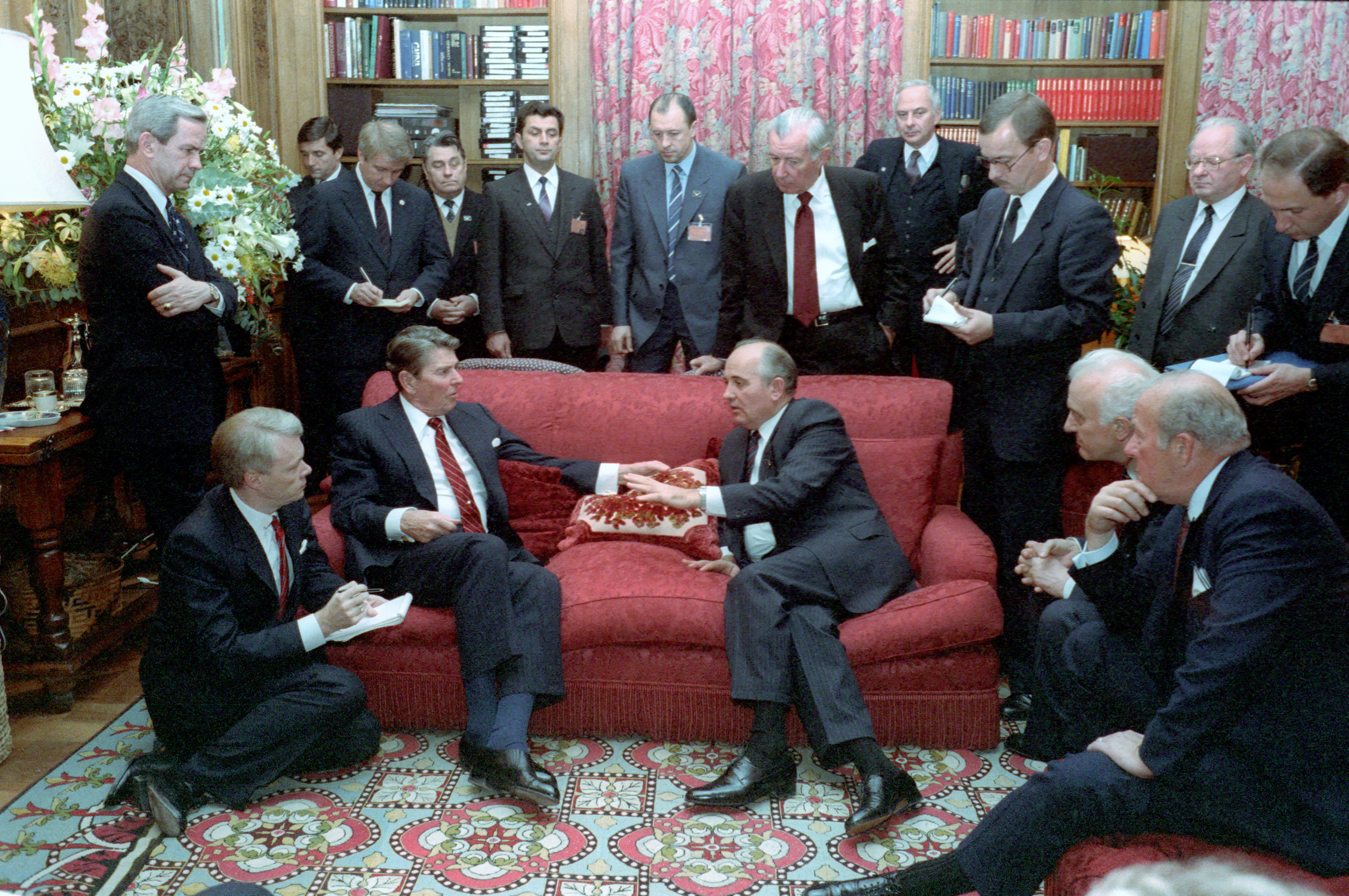
Reagan and Gorbachev with their major advisors at Maison de Saussure on the evening of November 20, 1985

With regards to planning for the summit's final ceremony, both Reagan and Shultz pressed Gorbachev to agree to having the two leaders perform a more visual verbal statement in front of the assembled press and television cameras in addition to the signing ceremony, arguing that "if these leaders were simply present and went through the business of signing documents, it would not be the same thing as having them actually speak." Gorbachev had preferred simply releasing a joint written communique, in that it would "represent the embodiment of the significance of such a document", and that inviting the leaders themselves to make verbal statements would be a mistake in that "there might even be an unfortunate phrase which would detract from the weight and significance of the document."

According to their memorandum of conversations Reagan "begged to disagree", saying "a full [verbal] statement would be an honest, frank and open document about what had, and had not, been achieved, and about the fact that these meetings between them would be continuing", stating that because he and the General Secretary "were there at a ceremony", they "would not have to comment on the specifics of any document". Reagan added that "hope in the world has grown as a result of this summit meeting, and people should not be disappointed in this respect." Gorbachev relented and agreed to a short verbal statement of one to three minutes duration, with Reagan concurring that it had always been his idea not to go into any great detail.

Reagan's push towards making a verbal statement rather than a written one was due to the paucity of strong agreements being reached at the summit which Reagan thought might discourage the public watching from afar, and that to prevent this, a verbal statement was needed to provide reassurance. The memorandum of conversations shows Gorbachev having difficulty with the apparent disingenuousness of warm-sounding verbal statements as opposed to the colder reality of a written communique, saying that ultimately, there "was no need for rose-colored glasses":

"Gorbachev noted that one other thing bothered him, namely, that having produced a document the sides do not believe in themselves; commenting on it, even briefly and generally, would only serve to strengthen and reaffirm the content of that document. President Reagan responded that instead of being silent, it would be better for the people who have placed so much hope in the outcome of these meetings to hear that he and Gorbachev are going to continue to meet despite the fact that they have not solved all of the problems connected with the communique. He [Reagan] said that the tone and the need here were simply not to leave this meeting and have people disappointed that there had been no progress and thus have the hopes of so many people dashed."

— Memorandum of Conversations, November 20, 1985

== Third day ==
=== Conclusion and agreements ===
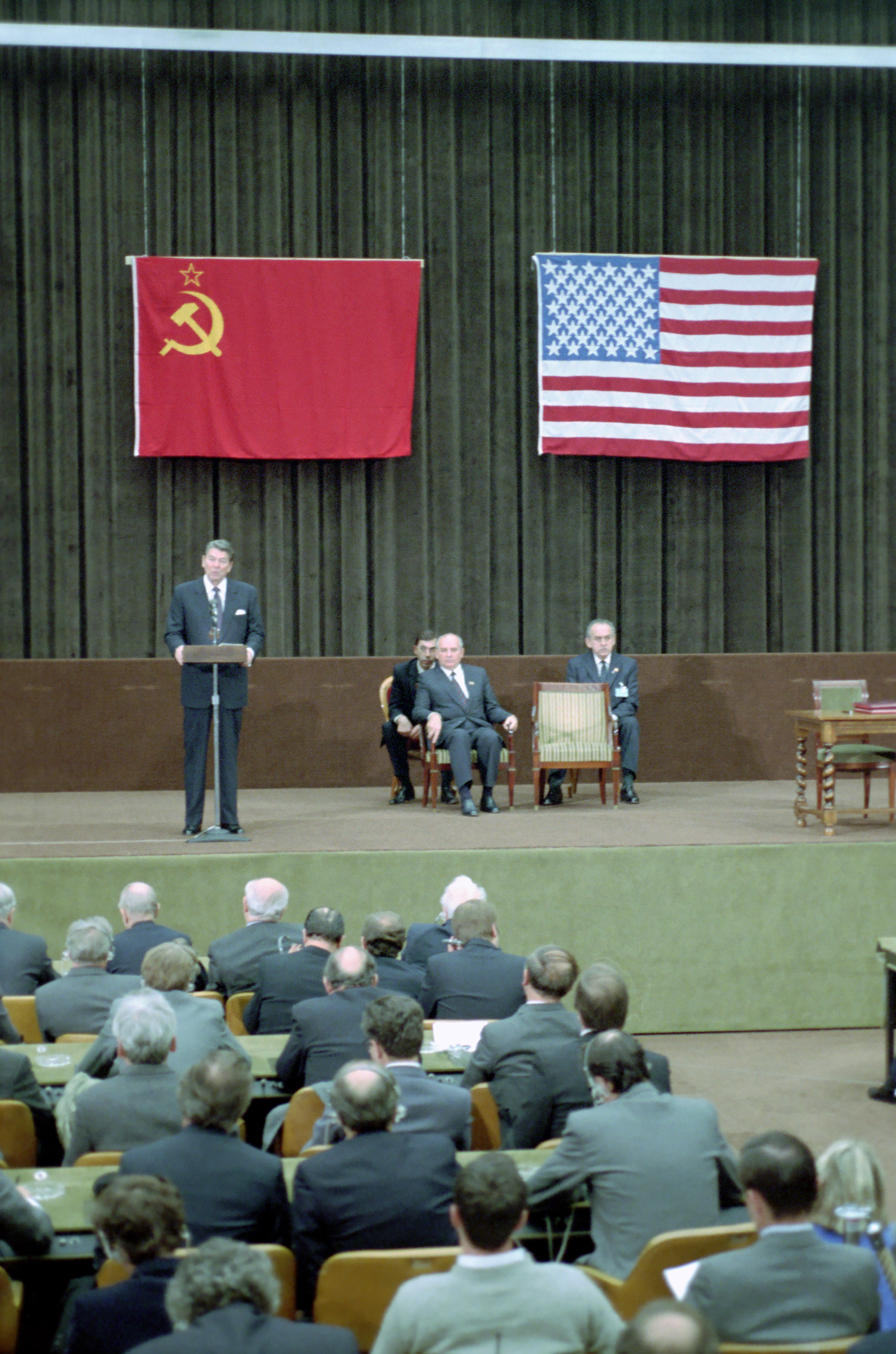
The closing joint-press conference of the Geneva Summit at CICG on November 21, 1985

On November 21, 1985, at Geneva's International Conference Center (CICG), Reagan and Gorbachev held a joint press conference announcing several agreements, including implementation of the already signed Northern Pacific Air Safety accord that aimed at preventing a repeat of the Soviet downing of Korean Airlines Flight 007 in September 1983. A signing ceremony followed, with an agreement on the opening of consulates in Kiev and New York being signed, as well as agreements to renew regular U.S.‑Soviet dialogue on future summit meetings. Forty‑one cultural exchange agreements were also signed, including the restart of exchanges of theatrical and artistic groups and major art exhibits that were suspended after the Soviet invasion of Afghanistan in December 1979.

Speaking before the press in the wake of the summit, Gorbachev commented on his meeting with Reagan:

The President and I have done a huge amount of work. We’ve gone into great detail; we’ve really done it in depth. And we’ve done it totally openly and frankly. We’ve discussed...relations between our two countries and the situations in the world in general today, ...issues and problems the solving of which...is of concern both to our countries and to the peoples of other countries in the world. We discussed these issues basing our discussions on both sides’ determination to improve relations between the Soviet Union and the United States of America. We decided that we must help to decrease the threat of nuclear war. We must not allow the arms race to move off into space and we must cut it down on earth. It goes without saying that discussions of these sorts we consider to be very useful...We have to be realistic and straightforward, and therefore the solving of the most important problems concerning the arms race and increasing hopes of peace we didn’t succeed in reaching at this meeting. So, of course, there are important disagreements on matters of principle that remain between us. However, the President and I have agreed that this work...will be continued...by our representatives. But the significance of everything which we have agreed...can only...be reflected if we carry it on into concrete measures. If we really want to succeed...both sides are going to have to do an awful lot of work...I would like to announce that the Soviet Union...will do all it can in this cooperation with the United States...to cut down the arms race, to cut down the arsenals which we’ve piled up and...produce the conditions...necessary for peace on earth and in space. We make this announcement perfectly aware of our responsibility both to our own people and to the other peoples of the earth. And we would very much hope that we can have the same approach from the Administration of the United States of America. If that can be so, then the work that has been done in these days in Geneva will not have been done in vain.

President Reagan's response was equally as optimistic in tone; he stated:

...We've packed a lot into the last two days. I came to Geneva to seek a fresh start in relations between the United States and the Soviet Union and we have done this. General Secretary Gorbachev and I have held comprehensive discussions covering all elements of our relationship. I’m convinced that we are heading in the right direction. We've reached some useful interim results which are described in the joint statement that is being issued this morning. In agreeing to accelerate the work of our nuclear arms negotiators, Mr. Gorbachev and I have addressed our common responsibility to strengthen peace. I believe that we have established a process for more intensive contacts between the United States and the Soviet Union. These two days of talks should inject a certain momentum...[that] we can continue at the meeting that we have agreed on for next year. Before coming to Geneva, I spoke often of the need to build confidence in our dealings with each other. Frank and forthright conversation at the summit are part of this process. But I’m certain General Secretary Gorbachev would agree that real confidence in each other must be built on deeds, not simply words. This is the thought that ties together all the proposals that the United States has put on the table..., and this is the criteria by which our meetings will be judged in the future. The real report card on Geneva will not come in for months or even years. But we know the questions that must be answered. Will we join together in sharply reducing offensive nuclear arms and moving to nonnuclear defensive strengths for systems to make this a safer world? Will we join together to help bring about a peaceful resolution of conflicts in Asia, Africa and Central America, so that the peoples there can freely determine their own destiny without outside interference? Will the cause of liberty be advanced, and will the treaties and agreements signed—past and future— be fulfilled? The people of America, the Soviet Union and throughout the world are ready to answer yes. I leave Geneva today and our fireside summit determined to pursue every opportunity to build a safer world of peace and freedom. There’s hard work ahead, but we’re ready for it. General Secretary Gorbachev, we ask you to join us in getting the job done, as I’m sure you will.

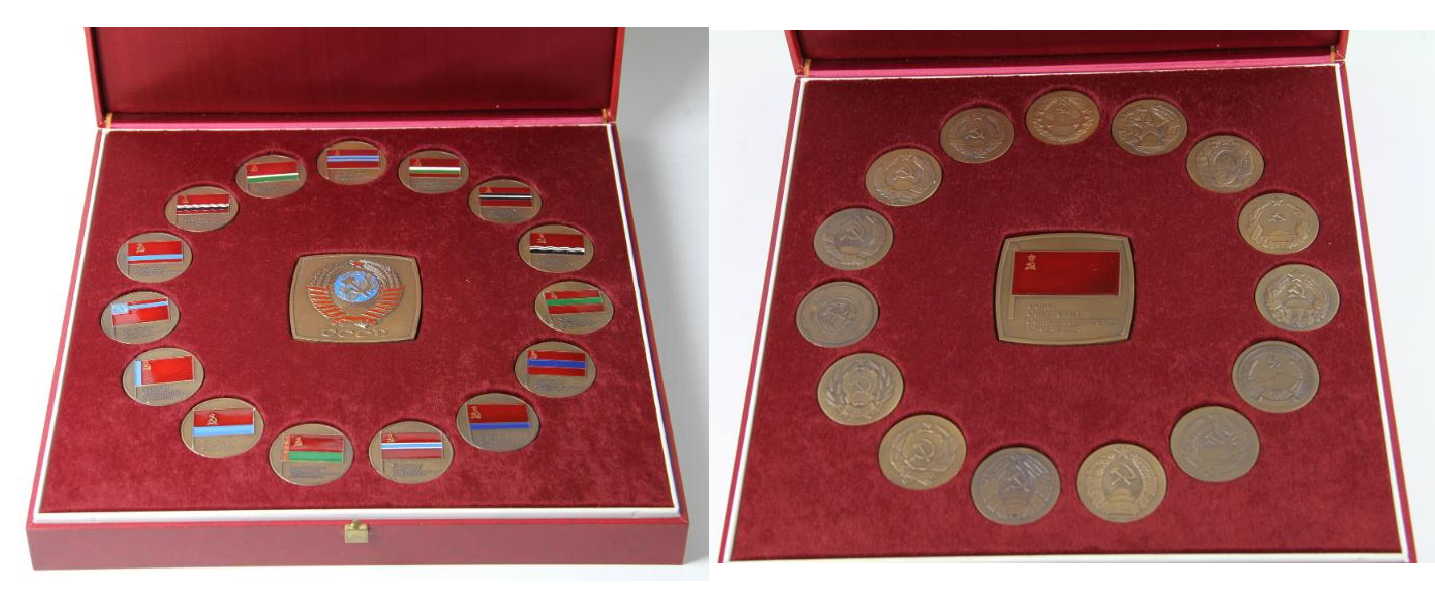
Set of 16 bronze medallions representing the 15 constituent Soviet Republics and the combined Soviet Union which Gorbachev gave to Reagan at the conclusion of the Geneva Summit.

At the end of the summit, Reagan gave Gorbachev a Colonial Williamsburg Chippendale-style mahogany box and desk set with fountain pens, carrying the theme "peace through communications", selected in honor of the 10th anniversary of the U.S.‑Soviet Apollo–Soyuz space mission. Gorbachev gave Reagan a set of 16 bronze medallions in a leather case representing the 15 constituent Soviet Republics along with the combined Soviet Union.

After a stop in Brussels to brief allies, Reagan returned to Washington to give an address on the summit to a joint session of Congress. Gorbachev on his return trip to Moscow stopped in Prague to brief the Soviets' Warsaw Pact allies.

== Legacy ==
Although the summit lacked the larger-type agreements seen in past summits such as SALT, the summit did help to reset relations, which by that point had reached a nadir, with no summit having been held for six years. Both Reagan and Gorbachev came away from Geneva feeling that they had "started something", with Reagan saying that the meetings in Geneva "expressed the will and desire of both sides to find answers that would benefit not only all the people of the world, but also the yet unborn". Gorbachev agreed, saying "if now we have laid the first few bricks, we have made a new start, a new phase has begun."

=== "a nuclear war cannot be won and must never be fought" ===
At the end of the summit, Reagan and Gorbychev issued a "Joint Soviet-United States Statement on the Summit Meeting in Geneva", which included the comment that they "agreed that a nuclear war cannot be won and must never be fought." This was renewed on January 3, 2022 by a Joint Statement of the Leaders of the [first] Five Nuclear-Weapon States on Preventing Nuclear War and Avoiding Arms Races, "that a nuclear war cannot be won and must never be fought". This statement was further reinforced by a 2022 report by ten leading experts on climatology, food production, and economics, that concluded that a nuclear war between the US and Russia would most likely lead to a nuclear winter, during the first two years of which over 80 percent of the world's population would starve to death if they did not die of something else sooner, including 99 percent of the populations of the US, Europe and Russia.

=== Reagan's use of mise‑en‑scène ===
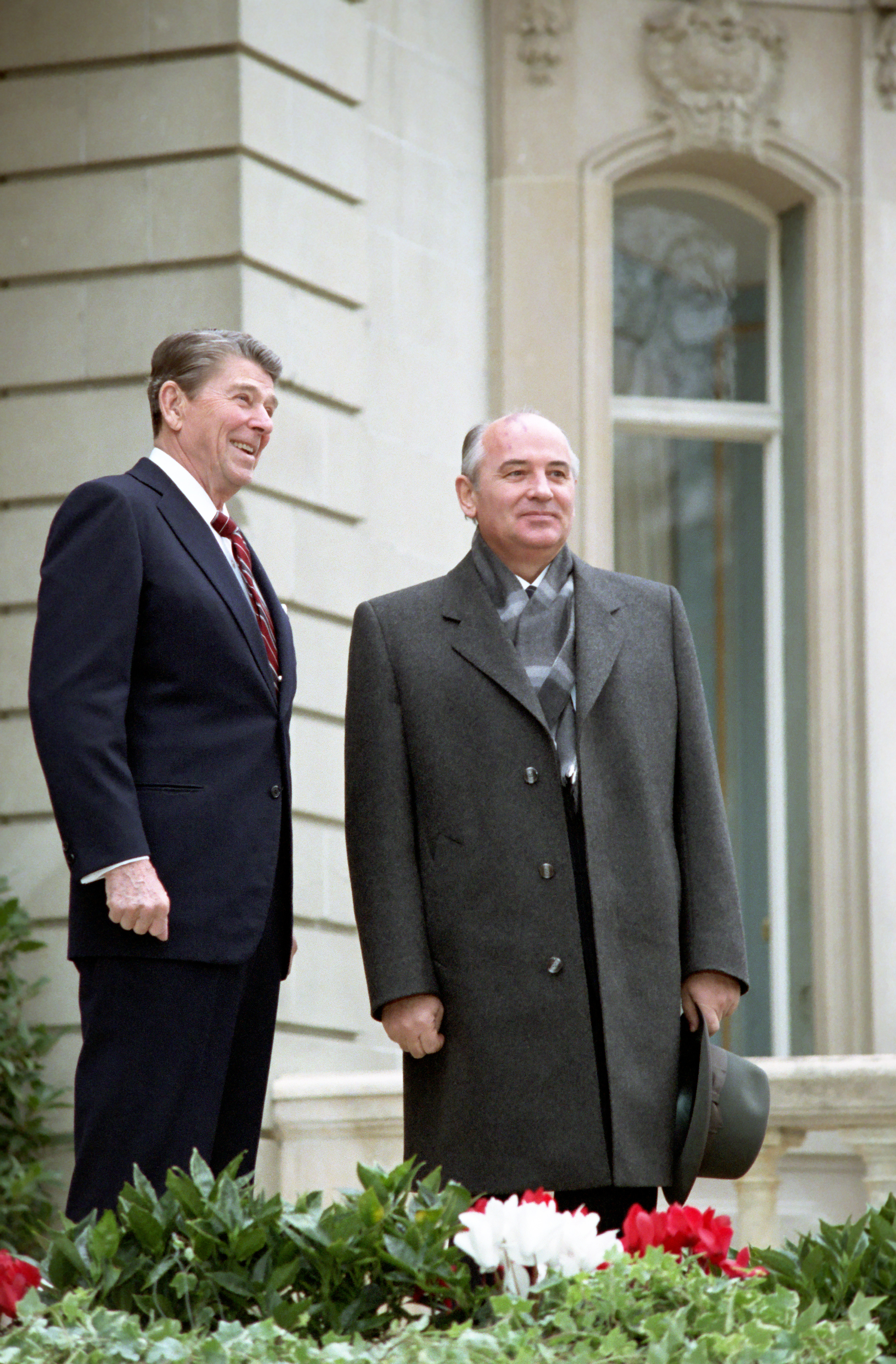
Reagan and Gorbachev at Fleur d'Eau

President Reagan's Address to Congress on the Geneva Summit at the US Capitol, November 21, 1985

According to Jack Matlock, instances during the summit which seemed to register most in the public consciousness, such as Reagan's absent overcoat and the pool house's roaring fireplace, showcased the role that public relations—in particular, the use of imagery—played in helping to convey the president's preferred messages, since in the Reagan White House, "few questions received more attention". Matlock explained:

"For those of us who planned the Geneva summit, we spent as much time thinking about presentation and appearance as we did about the issues themselves. William J. Henkel, who headed the advance team to Geneva and had long experience in arranging for effective campaign appearances, looked to every detail of imagery: where the press pool would be located so as to present Reagan in the most favorable light, what would be in the background of photographs, how to position Reagan to be seen as the dominant partner in the dialogue. ... It was Henkel's idea to have a fire in the fireplace when Reagan invited Gorbachev to stop in for a private chat during their planned walk around the Villa's grounds. The Soviet advance people were [also] obsessively protective of their leader's status. ... However, not having run election campaigns and with little experience dealing with Western journalists, they were no match for their American counterparts when it came to setting the stage to make their man look good."

— Jack Matlock, National Security Council special assistant; American Ambassador to Czechoslovakia (1981-1983) and the Soviet Union (1987-1991)

White House attempts at influencing the summit's visual narrative were not always so easily accepted by the gathered media. According to the LA Times, Reagan and Gorbachev's second private meeting at the pool house was initially described by White House Press Secretary Larry Speakes as spontaneous in nature, with Reagan ending his and Gorbachev's afternoon meeting 50 minutes early by suggesting that Gorbachev accompany him on a walk. "Donning coats on the chilly afternoon", the LA Times said, "they headed for the lake, joined only by interpreters. After a five-minute stroll, the two leaders entered a lakeside pool house where logs were blazing in the fireplace. They continued their talks for another 44 minutes." Speakes told the media that the impromptu walk to the pool house occurred because "the President, I think, felt at a certain point in the meeting that it was a desirable time for the two to continue their talks alone", with Speakes describing the genesis of the resulting second private meeting at the pool house as an entirely "unexpected development". Speakes did not reveal to the LA Times how the unexpected meeting had accommodations happened‑upon by the two leaders with such fortuitous inclusion of two chairs and an active fireplace, with Speakes only jokingly saying that the site was "probably one of those pool houses that has a 24‑hour‑a‑day fire".

== Key statements related to the summit ==
No.	Name of document	UN/GA document symbol	UN/SC document symbol
1	Interview given by the President of the United States of America, Ronald Reagan, to Izvestia Newspaper, published with reductions on November 4, 1985 (Moscow evening issue) and on November 5, 1985 (USSR national issue)	no data	no data
2	Address to the nation given by the President of the United States of America, Ronald Reagan, on the upcoming Soviet-United States summit meeting in Geneva on 14 November 1985	no data	no data
3	U.S.-Soviet joint statement issued in Geneva on 21 November 1985	A/40/1070	—
4	Press conference given by the General Secretary of the Central Committee of the Communist Party of the Soviet Union, Mikhail Gorbachev, in Geneva on November 21, 1985	no data	no data
5	Address given by the President of the United States of America, Ronald Reagan, before a joint session of the Congress following the Soviet-United States summit meeting in Geneva on 21 November 1985	no data	no data
6	Radio address to the nation given by the President of the United States of America, Ronald Reagan, on the Soviet-United States summit meeting in Geneva on 23 November 1985	no data	no data
7	Report given by deputy Mikhail Gorbachev, the General Secretary of the Central Committee of the Communist Party of the Soviet Union, at the session of the Supreme Soviet of the USSR on November 27, 1985	A/40/987	S/17670

== See also ==
- List of Soviet Union–United States summits (1943 to 1991)
