= Rebecca Matlock =

American photographer (1928–2019)

- Born: Rebecca Inez Burrum; December 7, 1928; Manchester, Tennessee
- Died: November 9, 2019 (aged 90); Durham, North Carolina
- Education: Duke University
- Occupation: Photographer
- Spouse: Jack F. Matlock, Jr. (m. 1949)
- Children: 5

Rebecca Burrum Matlock (December 7, 1928 – November 9, 2019) was an American photographer and the wife of former U.S. Ambassador Jack F. Matlock, Jr.

== Biography ==
Born Rebecca Inez Burrum in Manchester, Tennessee to Hugh H. Burrum and Leona M. Graham, she lived in Waverly and Gallatin, Tennessee. As an undergraduate at Duke University she met and married Jack F. Matlock, Jr.

After graduation, they moved to New York City where both took graduate studies at Columbia University. In 1953 they moved to Hanover, New Hampshire, where the first three of their children (James, Hugh, and Nell) were born. In 1956 the Matlocks joined the Foreign Service and were posted in following years to Vienna, Oberammergau, Moscow, Accra, Zanzibar, and Dar es Salaam. Two more children were born during their first tour in Moscow (David and Joseph).

The Matlocks served four tours in the Soviet Union, between 1961 and 1991, and during that time she travelled to 14 of the 15 Union Republics. They were posted to Moscow in 1961, 1974, 1981, and finally in 1987 when Jack Matlock was appointed U.S. Ambassador to the Soviet Union. During their final tour they lived at Spaso House in Moscow until 1991 and their retirement from the Foreign Service.

After leaving the Foreign Service they lived for five years in North Stonington, Connecticut, and New York City; and then moved to Princeton, New Jersey. In 2009 she was named Honorary Trustee of the Friends of Davis International Center of Princeton University. In later years the Matlocks divided their time between a home in Princeton and her family farm in Booneville, Tennessee.

On November 9, 2019, Ambassador Matlock posted publicly on his Facebook: "My beloved wife of 70 years, Rebecca Burrum Matlock, passed away this morning in Duke University Hospital." The cause of death has not yet been made public.

== Sarah Caldwell biography ==
Matlock served on the board of the Opera Company of Boston and interviewed director Sarah Caldwell over the course of several years to produce her biography, Challenges: A Memoir of My Life in Opera.

== Photography exhibits ==
Matlock has had more than 50 exhibits of her photographs, as well as a series of exhibits by photographer Donald Schomacker.

Some Exhibits of Rebecca Matlock's Photographs
Date	City	Venue	Exhibit	Reference
1983	Washington, DC	American Foreign Service Club Library	Black and White in Color
1984	New York	Columbia University	On Architecture
1984	New York	Republican Women’s Club	On Architecture
1985	Seattle, WA	University of Washington	Art in Czechoslovakia, including exhibition by Donald Schomacker
1988	Moscow	Cinematographers Union	International Film Festival
1989	Moscow	Photojournalists Union
January 1990	Moscow	Writer’s Union	People
1990	Vladivostok
1990	Tbilisi, Georgia
1990	Ulan Ude
March 8, 1999	Princeton, NJ	Stevenson Hall, Princeton University	Rebecca Matlock Exhibit
September, 1999	Princeton, NJ	Woodrow Wilson School, Princeton University	Excursion to Georgia
June 6, 2004	Tbilisi, Georgia	Tbilisi Movie Actors' Theatre	Special Places of Rebecca
March 18, 2005	Greensboro, NC	Nussbaum Center for Entrepreneurship	The Time of Mikhail Gorbachev
November 7–18, 2005	Princeton, NJ	Chancellor Green café, Princeton University	The Time of Mikhail Gorbachev
September 1, 2006	New York, NY	Harriman Institute, International Affairs Building	Gorbachevs, Reagans and Bushes
November 7, 2007	Princeton, NJ	Rockefeller College Gallery, Princeton University	Repairs of the Inca Bridge over Peru's Apurimac River
November, 2008	Princeton, NJ	International Center, Princeton University	Black and White in Color

== Published works ==
1. At Spaso House: People and meetings: Notes of the wife of an American ambassador (in Russian) Transl. from English by T. Kudriavtseva, Moscow: EKSMO, Algorithm, 2004 ISBN 5-699-05497-9
2. Challenges: A Memoir of My Life in Opera by Caldwell, Sarah with Matlock, Rebecca, Middletown, Conn. : Wesleyan University Press, 2008 ISBN 0-8195-6885-6
