= Booneville, Tennessee =

Unincorporated community in Tennessee, US

Coordinates: 35°16′27″N 86°27′52″W

Booneville is an unincorporated community in Lincoln County, Tennessee, in the United States.

== History ==
A post office called Booneville was established in 1869, and remained in operation until it was discontinued in 1905. The community was named for pioneer Daniel Boone.
