= List of University of Pennsylvania people =

This is a list of notable faculty, alumni and scholars of the University of Pennsylvania in Philadelphia, Pennsylvania, United States.

== Faculty ==
- Benjamin Abella: professor of emergency medicine
- Herman Vandenburg Ames: professor of constitutional history
- Francesca Russello Ammon: urban historian, assistant professor in the city and regional planning as well as the historic preservation departments
- John Andrews (1746–1813): Academy and College of Philadelphia, A.B., with distinguished honors, class of 1765, and M.A. class of 1767), professor of moral philosophy and logic (1789–1813) (where his courses included a course on United States Constitution); 4th Provost (1810–1813), 3rd vice provost (1789–1810)
- Alexander Dallas Bache (1806–1867): physicist, scientist, and surveyor, professor of natural philosophy and chemistry, superintendent of the United States Coast Survey
- Edmund Bacon: adjunct professor of architecture
- E. Digby Baltzell: emeritus professor of history and sociology; scholar and author; creator of the acronym "WASP"
- Aaron T. Beck: emeritus professor of psychiatry; considered the father of both cognitive therapy and cognitive behavioral therapy
- Richard Beeman: John Walsh Centennial Professor of History; Fulbright Scholar
- Janice R. Bellace: deputy provost and director of the Huntsman Program in International Studies and Business
- Charles Bernstein: Donald T. Regan Professor of English, prominent language poet
- Mary Frances Berry: Geraldine Segal Professor of Social Thought; former chair US Civil Rights Commission
- Joseph R. Biden, former Benjamin Franklin Professor of Presidential Practice: 2017– April 2019 (presently on "leave of absence") 46th president of the United States
- Ray Birdwhistell: professor, Annenberg School for Communication at the University of Pennsylvania
- Matt Blaze: associate professor of computer science
- Antony J. Blinken: US secretary of state under President Joseph R. Biden, director of the Penn Biden Center 2018–2020
- Sidney A. Bludman: physicist
- John Bowker: theologian
- Eric Bradlow: K.P. Chao Professor, professor of marketing, statistics, education and economics
- Ralph L. Brinster: Richard King Mellon Professor of Reproductive Physiology, creator of the transgenic mouse; National Medal of Science recipient
- Lawton Burns: chair of the Health Care Management Department of the Wharton School; James Joo-Jin Kim Professor
- Eugenio Calabi: Thomas A. Scott Professor Emeritus of Mathematics, known for his development of the Calabi–Yau manifold
- Arthur Caplan: Emanuel and Robert Hart Professor of Bioethics
- Britton Chance: National Medal of Science recipient; professor of biophysics
- Roger Chartier: professor of history; chair of history at the Collège de France; leading cultural historian
- Pei-yuan Chia: senior fellow of the CSI Center for Advanced Studies in Management at the Wharton School; former vice chairman of Citicorp and Citibank, member of AIG's board of directors
- Thomas Childers: Sheldon and Lucy Hackney Professor of History; author of numerous history publications and recipient of teaching awards
- Wallace H. Clark Jr.: pathologist, cancer researcher
- Mildred Cohn: National Medal of Science recipient; professor of biophysics and physical biochemistry
- George Crumb: Pulitzer Prize winner in music for "Echoes of Time and the River" in 1968 and received a Grammy Award for Best Classical Contemporary Composition for "Star-Child" in 2001; Walter H. Annenberg Professor in the Humanities and Professor in Music Department at Penn (1965–1997)
- Raymond Davis Jr.: National Medal of Science recipient; Nobel laureate; research professor of physics and astronomy
- Emile B. De Sauzé: language educator known for developing the conversational method of learning a language
- Frederick Dickinson: professor of Japanese history and co-director of the Lauder Institute of Management and International Studies
- John DiIulio: Frederic Fox Leadership Professor of Politics, Religion, and Civil Society
- W. E. B. Du Bois: African-American literary figure, visiting scholar, 1896–1897
- Gideon Dreyfuss: Isaac Norris Professor Biochemistry and Biophysics
- Loren Eiseley (1907–1977), University of Pennsylvania School of Arts and Sciences class of 1937, MA and Ph.D.: Benjamin Franklin Professor of Anthropology and History and Sociology of Science at Penn, anthropologist, philosopher, and natural science writer (such that Publishers Weekly referred to him as "the modern Thoreau" for broad scope of his writing reflected upon such topics as the mind of Sir Francis Bacon, the prehistoric origins of man, and the contributions of Charles Darwin)
- Dwight David Eisenhower, honorary Doctor of Law, class of 1947: 34th president of the United States
- Frederick Erickson: educational anthropologist
- Warren Ewens: professor of biology; creator of Ewens's sampling formula
- Peter Fader: Napster trial expert witness; Frances and Pei-Yuan Chia Professor of Marketing
- Ann Farnsworth-Alvear: associate professor of History
- Stubbins Ffirth: investigated yellow fever
- Peter J. Freyd: professor of mathematics
- Michael Fitts: legal scholar, former dean of the University of Pennsylvania Law School for 14 years, president of Tulane University in New Orleans, Louisiana, Judge Rene H. Himel Professor of Law at the Tulane School of Law
- Stewart D. Friedman: practice professor of management at the Wharton School; founding director of the Wharton School's Leadership Program
- Paul Fussell: emeritus professor of literature; National Book Award winner; cultural and literary historian
- Celso-Ramón García: former William Shippen Jr. Professor of Human Reproduction; helped to develop the combined oral contraceptive pill
- George Gerbner: professor and dean, Annenberg School for Communication; founder of cultivation theory
- Jacob Gershon-Cohen: professor of radiology; developer of mammography for detecting breast cancer
- Murray Gerstenhaber: professor of mathematics and lawyer; discoverer of Gerstenhaber algebra
- Erving Goffman: professor of sociology; author of The Presentation of Self in Everyday Life, Asylums
- Claudia Goldin (professor of economics 1979–1990): Nobel Prize in Economics
- Paul Gyorgy: National Medal of Science recipient; professor of pediatrics, School of Medicine
- Steven Hahn: Pulitzer Prize winner; Roy F. and Jeannette P. Nichols Professor of History
- David Harbater: Cole Prize recipient, known for solving the Abhyankar conjecture
- Lothar Haselberger: professor of architectural history
- De'Broski Herbert: professor of immunology
- Robin M. Hochstrasser: professor of chemistry
- Daniel Hoffman: poet, Felix E. Schelling professor of English, consultant in poetry to the Library of Congress
- Kathleen Hall Jamieson: professor of communications, Annenberg School for Communications; author; media analyst
- Daniel H. Janzen: professor of biology
- A.T. Charlie Johnson: Rebecca W. Bushnell Professor of Physics and Astronomy
- Vaughan Jones: Fields Medal winner, professor of mathematics
- Aravind Joshi: Henry Salvatori Professor of Computer and Cognitive science
- Louis Kahn: architect; works include the Jatiyo Sangsad Bhaban in Bangladesh and Jonas Salk Institute in California; professor of architecture
- Elihu Katz: Distinguished Trustee Professor of Communications
- E. Otis Kendall: professor of mathematics, 1855–1894
- Junhyong Kim: Edmund J. and Louise W. Kahn Term Endowed Professor of Biology
- Alan Kors: National Humanities Medal recipient, free speech advocate; George Walker Professor of History
- Bruce Kuklick: Roy F. and Jeannette P. Nichols Professor of American History
- William Labov: professor of linguistics; founder of quantitative sociolinguistics
- Ian Lustick: Bess W. Heyman Professor of Political Science; author of Trapped in the War on Terror
- Robert Litzenberger: professor emeritus at Wharton
- Jerre Mangione: novelist and scholar of the Italian-American experience
- Mihailo Marković: professor of philosophy
- E. Ann Matter: associate dean for Arts & Letters, R. Jean Brownlee Professor of Religious Studies
- Walter A. McDougall: Pulitzer Prize winner; Alloy-Ansin Professor of History and International Relations
- Olivia S. Mitchell: International Foundation of Employee Benefit Plans Professor of Insurance and Risk Management; executive director of the Pension Research Council and Boettner Center for Pensions and Retirement Research
- Irv Mondschein: track coach
- Roy F. Nichols: Pulitzer Prize winner; professor of history
- James J. O'Donnell: former vice provost for information systems and computing
- Brendan O'Leary: Lauder Professor of Political Science and Director of the Solomon Asch Center for the Study of Ethnopolitical Conflict
- Burt Ovrut: professor of physics; pioneer of the heterotic string theory
- Robert Patterson (1743–1824): professor of mathematics 1779–1814 at, and 1810–1813 also served as vice provost of, University of Pennsylvania; in 1805, President Thomas Jefferson appointed him director of the United States Mint
- Bob Perelman: professor of English; language poet
- Samuel H. Preston: Fredrick J. Warren Professor of Demography; known for his development of the Preston curve
- Amir Pnueli: associate professor at the Moore School of Engineering 1976–1978; Turing Award winner
- Hans Rademacher: Scott Chair, professor of mathematics; known for his theory of the reciprocity law for Dedekind sums
- Ravi Radhakrishnan: Herman P. Schwan Chair of Bioengineering
- Jagmohan Raju: Joseph J. Aresty Professor of Marketing; known for his research on pricing
- Robert A. Rescorla: Christopher H. Browne Distinguished Professor in Psychology; co-creator of the Rescorla–Wagner model
- Russell Burton Reynolds: US Army major general; assistant professor of military science and tactics
- David Rittenhouse: professor of astronomy; vice provost; trustee
- Rafael Robb: professor of economics
- George Rochberg: Annenberg Professor of the Humanities and professor of music
- C. Brian Rose: James B. Pritchard Professor of Archaeology; president of the Archaeological Institute of America; known for co-directing the modern excavations at Troy
- Philip Roth: Pulitzer Prize winner; professor of comparative literature and literary theory
- Brian M. Salzberg: neuroscientist, biophysicist and professor
- Florence B. Seibert: professor of biochemistry; winner of the Garvan–Olin Medal and member of the National Women's Hall of Fame
- Martin E. P. Seligman: Robert A. Fox Leadership Professor of Psychology
- Jeremy Siegel: Russell E. Palmer Professor of Finance; financial news commentator
- Rangita de Silva de Alwis: member-elect to the UN Convention on the Elimination of Discrimination Against Women; senior adjunct professor of global leadership
- Rogers Smith: Christopher H. Browne Distinguished Professor of Political Science
- Lee Stetson: dean of undergraduate admissions, 29 years
- Peter Sterling: neuroscientist and co-founder of the concept of allostasis
- Thomas J. Sugrue: Edmund J. and Louise W. Kahn Term Professor of History and Sociology
- Babu Suthar: Gujarati lecturer in South Asia Studies
- Iosif Vitebskiy: Soviet/Ukrainian Olympic medalist and world champion épée fencer
- Michael Vitez: Pulitzer Prize winner; professor of creative writing
- Donald Voet: associate professor of chemistry and co-author of several biochemistry textbooks
- Susan M. Wachter: Albert Sussman Professor of Real Estate; co-director of Penn Institute for Urban Research (Penn IUR)
- Arthur Waldron: Lauder Professor of International Relations in the Department of History; Scholar of Asian and Chinese history, especially in respect to war and nationalism
- Richard Wernick: Pulitzer Prize winner; composer; professor of Humanities
- Howard Winklevoss: professor of actuarial science
- Lightner Witmer: professor of psychology; inventor of the term clinical psychology
- Tukufu Zuberi: Lasry Family Professor of Race Relations; professor of sociology

== Academia ==
Penn alumni are the current or past presidents of over one hundred universities and colleges including Harvard University, University of Pennsylvania, Princeton University, Cornell University, University of California system, University of Texas system, Carnegie Mellon University, Northwestern University, Tulane University, Bowdoin College, and Williams College; and eight medical schools including New York University Medical School, and Vanderbilt University School of Medicine.

== Architecture ==
- Julian Abele (1881–1950), class of 1902: architectural designer; co-designed such works as the Philadelphia Museum of Art, the Central Branch of the Free Library of Philadelphia, Widener Memorial Library at Harvard University, and designed much of the campus of Duke University, including Duke Chapel
- William J. Bain: architect, co-founder of global architecture firm NBBJ
- Frank L. Bodine: architect
- Denise Scott Brown: architect; principal in Venturi, Scott Brown & Associates; wife of architect Robert Venturi
- Eduardo Catalano: architect
- Jaime Correa, architect and University of Miami professor
- Frank Miles Day: architect who made major additions to the campuses of the University of Pennsylvania, Pennsylvania State University, Princeton University and Wellesley College; national president of the American Institute of Architects, 1906–1907; a founding editor of House & Garden
- Thomas Harlan Ellett: architect, designed the Cosmopolitan Club in NYC and United States Post Office-Bronx Central Annex
- Joseph Esherick: Bay Area architect; professor at University of California, Berkeley
- Robert Fan: Chinese architect, designed Shanghai Concert Hall
- Bruce Graham: architect, designed Sears Tower, John Hancock Center, and Inland Steel Building in Chicago, as well as US Bank Center in Milwaukee (currently the tallest building in Wisconsin)
- Charles Gwathmey: FAIA, architect who studied at Penn, and later at Yale
- George Harold Waldo Haag, class of 1934: FAIA, school architect
- Taylor Hardwick: Florida architect who designed the original Haydon Burns Library and the Friendship Fountain in Jacksonville
- Henry C. Hibbs: architect, designed much of the campus of Vanderbilt University and the campus of Davidson College, as well as buildings for many other schools and universities
- Leicester Bodine Holland: architect and archaeologist
- Norton Juster: architect and writer for children, author of The Phantom Tollbooth
- Louis Kahn: architect, works include the Yale University Art Gallery and Jatiyo Sangsad Bhaban National Assembly Building, Dhaka, Bangladesh
- William Harold Lee: 20th-century movie theater designer and architect
- Milton Bennett Medary Jr.: architect, designed Washington Memorial Chapel at Valley Forge National Park and the Bok Singing Tower; with fellow alumnus William Charles Hays, he designed Houston Hall, America's first student union
- Barton Myers: architect
- I. M. Pei: modernist architect; briefly attended in 1935 before transferring to MIT
- Lionel Pries: architect
- Edmund R. Purves (class of 1920, B.S. in architecture): architect and executive director of American Institute of Architects
- Peter L. Shelton: architect and interior designer
- C. Wellington Walker: architect, completed extensive projects in Bridgeport, Connecticut, including Warren Harding High School, Bridgeport Hospital, United States Post Office-Bridgeport Main, and many buildings on the University of Bridgeport campus; co-designed Fairfield University's Bellarmine Hall; fellow of the American Institute of Architects
- David A. Wallace: architect whose firm Wallace Roberts & Todd was largely responsible for the revitalization of Baltimore's Inner Harbor
- Georgina Pope Yeatman, architect

== Arts and entertainment ==
- Charles Addams (1912–1988), college class of 1933, attended 1 year but did not graduate: creator of The Addams Family; said to have modeled the Addams Family mansion in part after Penn's College Hall
- Kabir Akhtar (born 1975), college class of 1996: television director and editor; won an Emmy Award in 2016; credits include work for Arrested Development, Crazy Ex-Girlfriend, Never Have I Ever, Behind the Music, and the Academy Awards
- Elizabeth Alexander: poet who recited at the 2009 inauguration of President Barack Obama
- Hoodie Allen, born Steven Markowitz: independent hip-hop artist, rapper, singer and songwriter
- Maryanne Amacher: composer
- Alex Aster: author
- Ti-Grace Atkinson: author, feminist
- Jon Avnet: film and television director, producer and writer
- Lucien Ballard: Academy Award-nominated cinematographer
- Elizabeth Banks: film director and Emmy-nominated actress, known for starring in The Hunger Games (2012); lead actress in Invincible; played Laura Bush in W.; Hasty Pudding Woman of the Year in 2020
- Leslie Esdaile Banks née Peterson (1959–2011), Wharton School of Finance class of 1981: wrote under the pen names of Leslie Esdaile, Leslie E. Banks, Leslie Banks and L. A. Banks in various genres; was 2008 Essence Literary Awards Storyteller of the Year
- Ralph Barbieri (1945–2020), Wharton MBA class of 1970: radio personality
- Albert C. Barnes (1872–1951), Penn Med class of 1892: inventor of Argyrol; founder of the Barnes Foundation, one of the most valuable art collections in the world
- Jack Barry: television game show producer and host, 1950s–1984
- Vanessa Bayer: actress, comedian, Saturday Night Live cast member, 2010–2017
- Eric Bazilian: singer, songwriter, guitarist, member of The Hooters
- W. Kamau Bell (born 1973): stand-up comic who has hosted the CNN series United Shades of America since 2016, and hosted FXX television series Totally Biased with W. Kamau Bell 2012–2013; 3x Emmy Award winner
- James Berardinelli: film critic
- Candice Bergen: Emmy-winning and Academy Award-nominated actress, star of the sitcom Murphy Brown
- Jed Bernstein: Tony Award-winning theater producer, president of the Lincoln Center for the Performing Arts
- Alfred Bester: recipient of the first Hugo Award for a science-fiction novel, The Demolished Man (1953); Science Fiction Grand Master (1988); author of The Stars My Destination (1956)
- Natvar Bhavsar: Indian-American abstract expressionist and color field artist
- H. G. Bissinger: author of Friday Night Lights; Pulitzer Prize-winning journalist
- Mark Blum (1950–2020): actor
- Beverly Bower: operatic soprano
- Stanley Burnside: cartoonist and painter
- Tory Burch: fashion designer and socialite
- Alfred Butts: inventor of the board game Scrabble
- Nkechi Okoro Carroll: television producer and writer
- Lorene Cary: author, educator and social activist
- Guymon Casady: Emmy-winning television producer for the HBO series Game of Thrones
- Rick Chertoff: music producer
- Ryan Choi: composer, musician
- Claudia Cohen: former "Page Six" gossip columnist for the New York Post
- Maureen Corrigan: author and critic
- Adrian Cronauer: radio personality and subject of biopic Good Morning, Vietnam
- Mark Cronin: television producer and writer
- Whitney Cummings: comedian and co-creator of the television series 2 Broke Girls
- Pamela Day: businesswoman and contestant of NBC reality show The Apprentice 2
- Joseph Deitch: Tony-winning Broadway producer
- Pat de Groot: English-born American painter
- James DePreist: permanent conductor of the Tokyo Metropolitan Symphony Orchestra; director of conducting and orchestral studies at the Juilliard School; laureate music director of the Oregon Symphony
- Bruce Dern: two-time Academy Award-nominated actor
- John S. Detlie: Academy Award-nominated art director and set designer
- Julie Diana: ballet dancer, ballet master, writer and arts administrator
- Gail Dolgin: Academy Award-nominated documentary filmmaker, Daughter from Da Nang
- John Doman: actor, star of HBO crime drama series The Wire
- John Drimmer: Emmy-winning television producer
- Dayton Duncan: Emmy-winning non-fiction writer
- Jennifer Egan: Pulitzer-winning; National Book Award finalist
- Ray Evans: Academy Award-winning songwriter
- Jonathan Leo Fairbanks: founding curator of the American decorative arts and sculpture department at the Museum of Fine Arts, Boston
- Jessie Fauset: author and contributor to the Harlem Renaissance
- Wendy Finerman: Academy Award-winning movie producer for Forrest Gump in 1994
- Melissa Fitzgerald: actress, known for her role on the television series The West Wing as Carol Fitzpatrick
- Frank Ford: long-time Philly radio talk show host, and co-founder of the Valley Forge Music Fair and the Westbury Music Fair
- Stephen J. Friedman: movie producer
- Zenos Frudakis: sculptor whose works are featured at institutions around the world
- Laura Gao: cartoonist, author of Messy Roots
- Richard Garfield: Penn Graduate School of Arts and Sciences Ph.D. Class of 1993 in combinatorial mathematics with thesis On the Residue Classes of Combinatorial Families of Numbers; invented trading card game Magic: The Gathering
- Robert Gant: actor, known as Ben on Queer as Folk
- Matt Gerald: actor, Avatar, Dexter, Yellowstone
- Stuart Gibbs: prolific author of books for teens and tweens
- Nikki Giovanni: poet and author; attended Penn but did not earn a degree
- Benjamin Glazer (Penn Law class of 1905): Academy Award-winning screenwriter and producer; in 1927 won the first Academy Award for Best Writing (Adapted Screenplay) for 7th Heaven; founding member of the Academy of Motion Picture Arts and Sciences
- Leonard Goldberg: former chairman of 20th Century Fox, television and movie producer
- Osvaldo Golijov: Grammy Award-winning composer of classical music
- Archie Green: folklorist and musicologist
- Zane Grey, University of Pennsylvania School of Dental Medicine: one of the twentieth century's most popular authors of Western novels and sport fishing
- Shelly Gross: Broadway producer and co-founder of the Valley Forge Music Fair and the Westbury Music Fair
- Joseph Hallman: Philadelphia classical and pop music composer, writer
- Stephen Hartke: winner of the Grammy Award for Best Contemporary Classical Composition in 2013
- William Stanley Haseltine: 19th-century painter; his works are included in the collections of museums such as the Metropolitan Museum of Art in New York City and the National Gallery of Art in Washington, D.C.
- Jennifer Higdon: Grammy-winning flutist and Pulitzer Prize-winning composer of classical music
- John Hoke III: chief design officer, Nike, Inc.
- Donelson Hoopes, class of 1960: art historian
- Ariel Horn: novelist
- Kristin Hunter: novelist
- Tetsugo Hyakutake: Japanese photographer
- Rob Hyman: singer, songwriter, keyboard player, member of The Hooters
- Michael Jackman: BAFTA-winning and Academy Award-nominated producer of the 2025 film Conclave
- Moe Jaffe (1901–1972): Wharton (class of 1923) and Penn Law (class of 1926); songwriter and bandleader, composed more than 250 songs including "Collegiate" (played by Chico Marx in Horse Feathers)
- George Clarke Jenkins: Academy Award-winning production designer and three-time Tony Award nominee
- John Jiller: playwright, novelist, and journalist
- Lee Sung Jin: Emmy and Golden Globe Award-winning creator of Beef, co-writer of Thunderbolts*
- Norton Juster: architect and writer for children, author of The Phantom Tollbooth
- Aaron Karo: college humorist who details Penn life in books and on the CollegeHumor website
- Reem Kassis: author of The Palestinian Table; James Beard Award nominee and Guild of Food Writers winner
- Duncan Kenworthy: producer of Four Weddings and a Funeral, Notting Hill; BAFTA winner
- Florence Kirk: operatic soprano
- Kartik Kumra: fashion designer
- Harry Kurnitz: screenwriter, playwright
- Sara Larkin: visual artist
- Elliot Lawrence: Tony-winning jazz pianist, composer and bandleader
- Gwyneth Leech: artist
- John Legend, college class of 1999: rhythm and blues singer/songwriter; winner of Emmy, Grammy Award, Oscar, Tony Award (EGOT
- Stephanie Lemelin: actress
- William Link: television and film writer and producer who co-created and produced the shows Columbo, Mannix, Ellery Queen and Murder, She Wrote
- Caren Lissner: novelist, author of Carrie Pilby
- Alan W. Livingston: record producer who signed The Beatles to their first major US contract; created the character Bozo the Clown
- Jay Livingston: Academy Award-winning songwriter
- John D. MacDonald: author, known for his Travis McGee series
- Aron Magner: keyboardist, The Disco Biscuits
- Mary Ellen Mark: photographer; Bachelor of Fine Arts in painting and art history (1962), master's degree in photojournalism at Annenberg School for Communication (1964)
- Stanley Marsh 3: Texas businessman, philanthropist, and artist known for the Cadillac Ranch off historic Route 66; received bachelor's and master's degrees in economics and history, respectively, from Penn
- John Masius: Emmy-winning TV producer and writer, Touched by an Angel, St. Elsewhere
- Suchitra Mattai: Guyanese-born American multidisciplinary contemporary artist
- James McDaniel: Emmy-winning actor
- Thor Halvorssen Mendoza: human rights advocate and film producer; founder, Human Rights Foundation
- Eve Merriam (College for Women class of 1937): author and actress
- Jonah Meyerson: film and television actor
- Ethan Mordden: novelist, theater historian
- Stephen Robert Morse: filmmaker, Emmy-nominated producer of Amanda Knox
- Naledge, born Jabari Evans: rapper, member of hip-hop group Kidz in the Hall
- David Naughton: actor known for starring in the horror film An American Werewolf in London (1981)
- Wendy Neuss, Penn College: class of 1976 (with a bachelor's degree in psychology) executive producer of several TV films starring her ex-husband Patrick Stewart, including A Christmas Carol, The Lion in Winter and King of Texas as the president of Flying Freehold Productions and co-producer of Star Trek: The Next Generation and the series Star Trek: Voyager and produced the Motown series
- Morgan Neville: Academy-, Grammy-, and Emmy-winning director and producer
- Becki Newton (College class of 2000): actress, Amanda on Ugly Betty
- Philip Francis Nowlan: science fiction writer, best known as the creator of Buck Rogers
- Ken Olin: Golden Globe Award-winning actor, known for his lead role on thirtysomething and as director and executive producer of Alias
- Kamau Amu Patton: multidisciplinary artist
- Rob Pearlstein: Academy Award-nominated writer and director
- Jim Perry, born Jim Dooley: US and Canadian television host
- Gina Philips: actress (attended, never graduated)
- Noah Pink: screenwriter, television producer, director, and swimmer
- Elizabeth Pipko: author, model
- Marc E. Platt: film, television and theatre producer who won two Tony Awards for serving as a producer for the Broadway productions of The Band's Visit and Michael R. Jackson's Pulitzer Prize-winning musical A Strange Loop
- Chaim Potok: author, The Chosen, The Promise, My Name Is Asher Lev, and The Gift of Asher Lev
- Ezra Pound: 20th-century Modernist poet; promoter of various writers and schools of literature; attended for two years before transferring to Hamilton College; returned to Penn and earned a master's degree in romance philology
- Maury Povich: talk show host; recipient of a Lifetime Achievement Emmy
- Harold Prince: winner of 21 Tony Awards as a Broadway producer for shows such as West Side Story and The Phantom of the Opera
- Paul Provenza: actor, comedian, and director of The Aristocrats
- Alan Rachins: actor (L.A. Law and Dharma and Greg)
- David Raksin: Academy Award-nominated composer known as the "grandfather of film music"
- Liza Redfield: first woman to be the full-time conductor of a Broadway pit orchestra
- Shabnam Rezaei: TV producer
- Tyler Ritter: actor (The McCarthys)
- Melissa Rivers, born Melissa Rosenberg: actress and daughter of comedian Joan Rivers
- Mark Rosenthal: screenwriter, Mona Lisa Smile, Planet of the Apes, Mighty Joe Young
- Anthony Russo: Emmy-winning film and television director-producer, Arrested Development, Community, Marvel Cinematic Universe films
- Noah Schnapp: actor (Stranger Things)
- Mary B. Schuenemann: 20th-century watercolorist
- Teddy Schwarzman: film producer, The Imitation Game
- Lisa Scottoline: author of legal thrillers; New York Times best-selling author: Edgar Award recipient
- Matt Selman: long-time writer and producer for animated series The Simpsons, 6-time Emmy Award winner
- Sylvan Shemitz: lighting designer known for his work on Grand Central Terminal in New York City and the Jefferson Memorial in Washington, D.C.
- Franklin L. Sheppard, class of 1872: Christian hymn composer who set "This is My Father's World" to music
- Robert B. Sinclair: film and theater director
- Trish Sie: Grammy-winning choreographer and director
- Grover Simcox: illustrator, naturalist and polymath
- Linda Simensky (1985): producer of animated works
- Everett Sloane: actor
- Michael Smerconish: radio host and political pundit
- Yakov Smirnoff: class of 2006, Master's in Psychology, comedian and painter
- David Branson Smith: screenwriter of Ingrid Goes West
- Martin Cruz Smith: author of Gorky Park
- Jordan Sonnenblick: author of Drums, Girls, and Dangerous Pie
- Devo Springsteen, born Devon Harris: Grammy-winning music producer and songwriter
- Ty Stiklorius: Emmy-winning film and television producer, music executive, and philanthropist
- David Stone: Broadway producer, Wicked
- Michael Tearson: voice of Philadelphia radio, DJ for WMMR, WXPN and WMGK
- Atha Tehon: art editor and book publisher
- Tammi Terrell: Grammy-nominated soul singer, known for her association with Motown and duets with Marvin Gaye
- George Thayer: political writer
- Vivek Tiwary (born 1973), college and Wharton class of 1996: Broadway producer and winner of a Grammy Award and 25 Tony Awards
- Lynn Toler: judge on the TV series Divorce Court
- Bobby Troup: actor, songwriter known for writing the popular standard "(Get Your Kicks On) Route 66", and for his role as Dr. Joe Early in the 1970s TV series Emergency!
- Garner Tullis: artist whose works are included in the Cleveland Museum of Art, Museum of Modern Art in New York, San Francisco Museum of Modern Art and Philadelphia Museum of Art
- M.G. Vassanji: Canadian novelist and member of the Order of Canada
- Tony Verna: sports and entertainment producer credited with inventing the "instant replay"; dropped out
- William Thompson Walters: businessman and art collector, whose collection formed the basis of the Walters Art Museum
- Mark Waters: director, Mean Girls
- Ted Weems (originally Wemyes): bandleader honored with a star on the Hollywood Walk of Fame
- Helen L. Weiss, College for Women class of 1941, composer who died at age 28 and for whom the Helen L. Weiss Music Award is given out annually since 1964 to a student in Penn Department of Music
- Ai Weiwei: artist
- Ned Wertimer: actor who portrayed Ralph the doorman on the long-running sitcom The Jeffersons
- John Edgar Wideman: author, Rhodes Scholar
- C.K. Williams: Pulitzer Prize and National Book Award-winning poet
- William Carlos Williams: poet; National Book Award and Pulitzer Prize winner
- Dick Wolf: Emmy-winning producer and creator of Law & Order series
- Aaron Yoo: actor who starred in the 2007 films Disturbia and American Pastime
- Rick Yune: actor
- John Zacherle: horror-show host
- Harriet Zeitlin: artist
- Chip Zien (b. 1947; Penn College class of 1969): chairman of the Mask and Wig Club as student and now actor
- Sidney Zion: novelist, journalist
- David Zippel: Tony-winning theatre lyricist

== Athletics ==
=== College football Hall of Famers ===
- Reds Bagnell: Maxwell Award football halfback at Penn, and member of the College Football Hall of Fame
- Chuck Bednarik (1925–2015), nicknamed "Concrete Charlie", class of 1949: played for Penn Quakers football as offensive center and defensive linebacker, as well as occasional punter; three-time All-American who was elected to the College Football Hall of Fame; won the Maxwell Award that year
- George H. Brooke: member of the College Football Hall of Fame; played for Penn and Swarthmore College
- Charlie Gelbert: member of the College Football Hall of Fame
- John Heisman: namesake of the Heisman Trophy; president of the American Football Coaches Association; head football coach at Clemson University (1900–1903), Georgia Tech (1904–1919), the University of Pennsylvania (1920–1922), Washington & Jefferson College (1923), and Rice University (1924–1927)
- Bill Hollenback, class of 1909 (1886–1968): football player and coach; playing at Penn, he was selected as an All-American fullback three consecutive years (1906–1908)
- Ed McGinley: member of the College Football Hall of Fame
- Leroy Mercer: member of the College Football Hall of Fame and the 1910 College Football All-America Team
- John Minds: member of the College Football Hall of Fame
- Skip Minisi: member of the College Football Hall of Fame
- Bob Odell: member of the College Football Hall of Fame
- Winchester Osgood: former Penn football player and member of the College Football Hall of Fame
- John H. Outland: Penn Med class of 1900; namesake of Outland Trophy in college football
- George Savitsky: member of the College Football Hall of Fame
- Hunter Scarlett: member of the College Football Hall of Fame
- Vince Stevenson: member of the College Football Hall of Fame
- Bob Torrey: member of the College Football Hall of Fame
- Charles Wharton: member of the College Football Hall of Fame

=== Head coaches (all sports) ===
- Jerome Allen: former NBA player, member of Philadelphia Big 5 Hall of Fame and head coach of Penn's men's basketball team (2009–2015)
- E. B. Beaumont: first head football coach at University of Alabama
- Marty Brill: head football coach at La Salle University and Loyola Marymount University
- Alfred E. Bull: head football coach at University of Iowa, Franklin & Marshall College, Georgetown University, Lafayette College, and Muhlenberg College
- Byron W. Dickson: head football coach at Lehigh University
- Dexter Draper: head football coach at University of Texas (1909)
- James Dwyer: head football coach at Louisiana State University and University of Toledo
- Mike Elko: head football coach at Texas A&M University (2023–present) and at Duke University (2021–2023).
- George Flint: All-American basketball player at Penn, later head coach University of Pittsburgh's Panthers men's basketball team for ten seasons, 1911–12 to 1920–21, where he compiled an overall record of 105–68 (.607)
- Bob Folwell: head football coach at Lafayette College, Washington & Jefferson College, University of Pennsylvania, and United States Naval Academy; first head coach of New York Giants
- Tom Gilmore: head football coach at College of the Holy Cross
- Edward Green: head football coach at University of North Carolina at Chapel Hill in 1908 and North Carolina College of Agriculture and Mechanic Arts, now North Carolina State University, 1909–1913
- Dick Harter: head coach in men's basketball at University of Oregon, Pennsylvania State University, and University of Pennsylvania
- John Heisman: namesake of Heisman Trophy; president of American Football Coaches Association; head football coach at Oberlin College (1892, 1894), Buchtel College, now University of Akron (1893–1894), Auburn University (1895–1899), Clemson University (1900–1903), Georgia Tech (1904–1919), the University of Pennsylvania (1920–1922), Washington & Jefferson College (1923), and Rice University (1924–1927)
- Bill Hollenback: member of College Football Hall of Fame and head football coach at Penn State (1909, 1911–1914)
- Jack Hollenback: head football coach at Franklin & Marshall College 1908–1909, Pennsylvania State University in 1910, and Pennsylvania Military College, now Widener University in 1911
- Danny Hutchinson: head football coach at Wesleyan University
- Roy Jackson: head football coach at University of Pittsburgh
- Taylor Jenkins (born 1984), class of 2007: head coach of Memphis Grizzlies of National Basketball Association
- Charles Keinath: head coach in basketball at Penn (1909–12)
- A. R. Kennedy: head football coach at Washburn University (1903, 1916–1917) and University of Kansas (1904–1910)
- Alden Knipe: head football coach at University of Iowa, 1898–1902
- Otis Lamson: member of 1905 College Football All-America Team, 1907 head football coach at University of North Carolina
- Matt Langel: head coach in men's basketball at Colgate University
- Dan Leibovitz: head coach in men's basketball at University of Hartford
- George Levene: head football coach at University of Tennessee (1907–09)
- Lou Little, born Luigi Piccolo: head football coach at Columbia University 1930–1956, responsible for Columbia's 1934 win over Stanford University in the Rose Bowl; served as president of American Football Coaches Association
- John Lyons: head football coach at Dartmouth College (1992–2004) and assistant coach University of New Hampshire (2011–2021)
- Harry Arista Mackey: head football coach at University of Virginia
- John Macklin: head coach in football, basketball, baseball and track and field at Michigan Agricultural College, now Michigan State University (winningest head football coach in that school's history)
- Fran McCaffery: head coach in basketball at Lehigh University, University of North Carolina, Greensboro, Siena College and the University of Iowa
- Jack McCloskey (class of 1948): head coach in men's basketball at Penn 1966–1971, then Wake Forest University and Portland Trail Blazers, later general manager of the Detroit Pistons and Minnesota Timberwolves
- Edward McNichol: Penn alumnus and head coach in men's basketball who led the Quakers to a national championship in his first season (1920–1921), producing a 21–2 overall record
- Sol Metzger: head football coach at Penn, Oregon State University, West Virginia University, Washington & Jefferson College, and University of South Carolina
- David Micahnik: Penn alumnus and fencing coach and member of USFA Hall of Fame
- Allie Miller: head football coachat Villanova University
- George Munger: member of the College Football Hall of Fame (as coach)
- B. Russell Murphy: first head coach in basketball at Johns Hopkins University
- Samuel B. Newton: head football coach at Pennsylvania State University (1896–1898), Lafayette College (1899–1901, 1911), Lehigh University (1902–1905), and Williams College (1907–09)
- Harry Parker: head coach in varsity rowing at Harvard University
- Simon F. Pauxtis: head football coach at Dickinson College (1911–1912), and the Pennsylvania Military Academy, now Widener University, 1916–1929 and 1936–1946
- Frank Piekarski: head football coach at Washington & Jefferson College, member of the 1904 College Football All-America Team
- Jack Ramsay: head coach, Portland Trail Blazers and member of the Basketball Hall of Fame
- Charles Rogers: head football coach at University of Delaware
- Seth Roland: head coach in men's soccer at Fairleigh Dickinson University
- Michael Saxe: head coach in basketball at Villanova University 1920–1926
- Frank Sexton: Major League Baseball player, and head coach in baseball at Brown University, Harvard University and University of Michigan
- Kevin Stefanski: head coach for the Cleveland Browns of the NFL
- Andy Smith: Penn alumnus and head football coach at University of California, Berkeley 1916–1925 (until 2011, the winningest head football coach in that school's history); member of the College Football Hall of Fame (as coach)
- Andrew Toole: head coach in basketball at Robert Morris University
- Elwood Otto "Woody" Wagenhorst (1863–1946), Penn Law class of 1892: head football coach at Penn 1888–1891, compiling a record of 39–18, while a student at Penn Law; University of Alabama in 1896; and the University of Iowa in 1897
- Garfield Weede: head football coach at Washburn University and Pittsburg State University; member of the Kansas Sports Hall of Fame, and dentist
- Doctor Weeks: first head football coach at University of Massachusetts Amherst
- Carl Sheldon Williams: college football coach; won national championships for Penn in 1904 and 1907
- Henry L. Williams: member of the College Football Hall of Fame (as coach); coached at the United States Military Academy and the University of Minnesota
- George Washington Woodruff: member of the College Football Hall of Fame (as coach)
- Wylie G. Woodruff: head football coach at University of Kansas

=== NFL champions ===
- Chuck Bednarik (class of 1949): Philadelphia Eagles linebacker and 1960 NFL champion; member of the Pro Football Hall of Fame and College Football Hall of Fame; namesake of the Chuck Bednarik Award in college football; recipient of the 2010 Walter Camp Distinguished American Award
- George Washington Tuffy Conn (1892–1973), class of 1920: professional American football player who played in 1920 for the Cleveland Tigers and the Akron Pros of the American Professional Football Association (renamed the National Football League in 1922) and won the first AFPA-NFL title that season with the Pros
- Jim Finn (class of 1999): NFL fullback and New York Giants Super Bowl XLII Champion
- Ernest Alexander Tex Hamer (1901–1981), class of 1923: 1926 NFL Champion playing for Frankford Yellow Jackets
- Walter Irving Pard Pearce (1896–1974, class of 1920): won 1921 NFL Championship playing for the Chicago Staleys (now the Chicago Bears)
- Carroll Rosenbloom (class of 1928): two-year letterman as halfback on the Penn football team in 1927 and 1928; owner of two National Football League franchises, the Baltimore Colts and Los Angeles Rams, where his franchises amassed the best ownership winning percentage in NFL history (.660) (with a total regular season record of 226 wins, 116 losses, and 8 ties) and won 3 NFL championships (1958, 1959, 1968), and one Super Bowl (V)
- Justin Watson (class of 2018): NFL wide receiver and Tampa Bay Buccaneers Super Bowl LV and Kansas City Chiefs Super Bowl LVII and Super Bowl LVIII Champion

=== Olympic medalists ===
The university currently holds the record for most medals (21) won by its alumni at any single Olympic Games (1900 Summer Olympic Games), and at least 43 alumni have earned Olympic medals, as detailed below.

- Irving Baxter (1876–1957), Penn Law class of 1901: competed in the 1900 Summer Olympic Games in Paris, where he won three silver and two gold medals; retired from competitive track and field without ever having lost a high jumping contest; admitted to the State Bar of New York, appointed special judge for City of Utica, New York, and US Commissioner of the Northern District of New York
- Greg Best: winner of two silver medals at the 1988 Summer Olympic Games
- Andrew Byrnes: Canadian rower and winner of a gold medal at the 2008 Summer Olympic Games and a silver medal at the 2012 Summer Olympic Games
- Bill Carr: winner of two gold medals at the 1932 Summer Olympic Games; member of the National Track & Field Hall of Fame
- Nathaniel Cartmell: winner of four Olympic medals, two silver at the 1904 Summer Olympic Games, and a gold and a bronze at the 1908 Summer Olympic Games; first head coach in men's basketball at the University of North Carolina at Chapel Hill
- Britton Chance, ForMemRS (1913–2010), Penn College class of 1935, B.A., M.A. 1936, and Ph.D. degree in physical chemistry (1940) at Penn, winner of a gold medal in sailing at the 1952 Summer Olympic Games retired as the Eldridge Reeves Johnson University Professor Emeritus of biochemistry and biophysics, as well as professor emeritus of Physical Chemistry and Radiological Physics at the University of Pennsylvania School of Medicine
- Frank Chapot: winner of two silver medals in equestrian, one at the 1960 Summer Olympic Games and another at the 1972 Summer Olympic Games; member of the United States Show Jumping Hall of Fame
- Gene Clapp: winner of a silver medal at the 1972 Summer Olympic Games
- Meredith Colket (1878–1947) (College class of 1901 and Penn Law class of 1904): winner of a silver medal in the Pole vault at the 1900 Summer Olympics in Paris and won the silver medal in the men's pole vault just behind his fellow Penn Law alumnus, Irving Baxter, who won the gold medal
- Ellie Daniel, class of 1974: winner of four Olympic medals, a gold, silver and bronze at the 1968 Mexico City Olympic Games, and a bronze at the 1972 Summer Olympic Games; member of the International Swimming Hall of Fame
- Anita DeFrantz, Penn Law class of 1976: won bronze medal at the 1976 Summer Olympic Games as part of women's eight-oared shell; first woman and first African-American to represent the United States on the International Olympic Committee (IOC) and was IOC's first female vice president and first woman on US Olympic Committee; chair of the Commission on Women and Sports
- Michalis Dorizas Penn Graduate School Class of 1924: winner of a silver medal (for Greece) at the 1908 Summer Olympic Games (also played Football and wrestled for Penn)
- Earl Eby: winner of a silver medal in track and field at the 1920 Summer Olympic Games
- Susan Francia: winner of two gold medals, one at the 2012 Summer Olympic Games and one at the 2008 Summer Olympic Games in women's rowing; and two gold medals at the 2009 World Rowing Championships
- Sarah Garner: winner of a bronze medal at the 2000 Summer Olympic Games and two gold medals at the World Rowing Championships (1997 and 1998)
- James Gentle: winner of a bronze medal at the 1932 Summer Olympic Games; member of the National Soccer Hall of Fame
- Samuel Gerson: winner of a silver medal in wrestling at the 1920 Summer Olympics
- Thomas Truxtun Hare (Undergraduate class of 1901 and Penn Law class of 1903): at the 1900 Summer Olympic Games; won silver medal in hammer throw and at the 1904 Summer Olympic Games; won bronze medal in the "all-rounder" (now known as the decathlon) which consisted of 100-yard run, shot put, high jump, 880-yard walk, hammer throw, pole vault, 120-yard hurdles, weight throw, long jump and one mile run; won gold medal as part of tug of war team (also a charter member of the College Football Hall of Fame)
- L. Janusz Hooker: winner of a bronze medal (for Australia) at the 1996 Summer Olympics
- Sarah Hughes, Penn Law class of 2018 (born 1985): former competitive figure skater who is the 2002 Winter Olympics gold medalist champion and the 2001 world bronze medalist in ladies' singles
- Sid Jelinek: winner of a bronze medal at the 1924 Summer Olympics
- John B. Kelly Jr.: accomplished oarsman, four-time Olympian, and Olympic medallist at the 1956 Summer Olympic Games, president of the United States Olympic Committee and member of the United States Olympic Hall of Fame; brother of actress Grace Kelly; namesake of Kelly Drive in Philadelphia
- Alvin Kraenzlein Penn Dental School class of 1900: four-time gold medallist at the 1900 Summer Olympic Games
- Donald Lippincott: winner of a silver and a bronze medal at the 1912 Summer Olympic Games
- Oliver MacDonald: winner of a gold medal at the 1924 Summer Olympic Games
- Hugh Matheson: winner of a silver medal (for Great Britain) at the 1976 Summer Olympic Games
- Josiah McCracken: winner of a silver and a bronze medal at the 1900 Summer Olympic Games; later Chief Resident Physician at Pennsylvania Hospital, one of the first public hospitals in the US
- Jack Medica: winner of a gold and two silver medals at the 1936 Summer Olympic Games; graduate student at Penn, but did not earn a degree
- Ted Meredith: Olympic distance runner, won two gold medals at the 1912 Summer Olympic Games
- Leslie Milne: winner of a bronze medal in women's field hockey at the 1984 Summer Olympic Games
- Ted Nash: winner of a gold medal at the 1960 Summer Olympic Games and a bronze medal at the 1964 Summer Olympic Games in rowing
- George Orton: winner of a gold and a bronze medal at the 1900 Summer Olympic Games; the debut Canadian to win an Olympic medal; member of Canada's Sports Hall of Fame and Canadian Olympic Hall of Fame
- John Pescatore: winner of a bronze medal at the 1988 Summer Olympic Games; head coach in men's rowing at Yale University
- Lisa Rohde: winner of a silver medal in rowing at the 1984 Summer Olympic Games
- Charles Sheaffer: winner of a bronze medal at the 1932 Summer Olympic Games
- Brandon Slay: winner of a gold medal at the 2000 Summer Olympic Games in freestyle wrestling
- Erinn Smart: winner of a silver medal in fencing at the 2008 Summer Olympic Games
- Walter Staley: winner of a bronze medal in men's equestrian at the 1952 Summer Olympic Games
- Julie Staver: winner of a bronze medal in women's field hockey at the 1984 Summer Olympic Games
- Phillip Stekl: winner of a silver medal in rowing at the 1984 Summer Olympic Games
- Michael Storm: winner of a silver medal in the Modern Pentathlon at the 1984 Summer Olympic Games
- John Baxter Taylor Jr.: debut African-American to win a gold medal at the 1908 Summer Olympic Games
- Walter Tewksbury: winner of five medals at the 1900 Summer Olympic Games, two gold, two silver and a bronze
- Alan Valentine: winner of a gold medal as part of the American rugby union team at the 1924 Summer Olympics

=== Professional basketball players ===
- Ernie Beck (class of 1953): selected by Philadelphia Warriors as the 2nd overall pick in the 1953 National Basketball Association draft (winning NBA championship in 1956), played for the St. Louis Hawks (now Atlanta Hawks), and Syracuse Nationals (now known as Philadelphia 76ers)
- Ira Bowman (class of 1996): former NBA player for Philadelphia 76ers and Atlanta Hawks
- A. J. Brodeur (class of 2020): former professional basketball player for Mitteldeutscher BC and Kangoeroes Basket Mechelen
- Perry Bromwell (class of 1987): drafted in 6th round of 1987 NBA Draft by the New Jersey Nets
- Corky Calhoun (class of 1972): selected by Phoenix Suns as the 4th overall pick in the 1972 NBA Draft, played for four teams in nine seasons; won NBA championship title with the Portland Trail Blazers in 1977
- "Chink" Francis Crossin (1923–1981; class of 1947): selected by Philadelphia Warriors as the 6th overall pick in the 1947 Basketball Association of America (which a few years later merged into another professional league) Draft, played for the Warriors for three years and averaged a career-high 7.0 points per game in 1949–50, named EBA Most Valuable Player in 1952
- Matt Maloney (class of 1995): not selected in the 1995 NBA draft but signed with the Houston Rockets, played six NBA seasons with the Houston Rockets, Atlanta Hawks, and Chicago Bulls and, in 1997, named to the NBA All-Rookie Second Team
- Bob Morse (class of 1972): played in Europe, named in 2008 as one of the 50 most influential personalities in European club basketball played for Italian League club Pallacanestro Varese, also led the Italian League in scoring during six seasons
- Tony Price (class of 1979): selected by the Detroit Pistons as the overall 29th pick in the second round of the 1979 NBA Draft, played five games for the San Diego Clippers
- Zack Rosen (class of 2012): All-American basketball player; played professionally with Hapoel Holon, Hapoel Jerusalem B.C., and Maccabi Ashdod B.C., all of the Israeli Basketball Super League; won the 3-point shootout in the Israeli Super League All Star Game in 2014 and 2015
- Jerry Simon (class of 1990): basketball player, American-Israeli, who after being captain of Penn basketball team played professional basketball in Israel for three teams in the Israeli Basketball Premier League, and for the Israel men's national basketball team
- Matthew White (class of 1979): basketball player, selected by Portland Trail Blazers, played professionally in the Liga ACB for several teams

=== Professional football players ===
- Chuck Bednarik (class of 1949): Philadelphia Eagles linebacker and 1960 NFL champion; member of the Pro Football Hall of Fame and College Football Hall of Fame; namesake of the Chuck Bednarik Award in college football; recipient of the 2010 Walter Camp Distinguished American Award
- Eddie Bell, College class of 1955: first black All-American in football, who then played for the National Football League's Philadelphia Eagles 1955–1958, Canadian Football League's Hamilton Tiger-Cats in 1959 (where he was selected as an All-Star at linebacker), and American Football League's New York Titans in 1960
- George Washington Tuffy Conn (1892–1973), class of 1920: professional American football player who played in 1920 for the Cleveland Tigers and the Akron Pros of the American Professional Football Association (renamed the National Football League in 1922) and won the first AFPA-NFL title that season with the Pros
- Jim Finn (class of 1999): NFL fullback and New York Giants Super Bowl XLII Champion
- Ernest Alexander Tex Hamer (1901–1981), class of 1923: 1926 NFL Champion playing for Frankford Yellow Jackets
- Jeff Hatch (born 1979; class of 2002): selected during the third round of the 2002 NFL draft as the 78th overall pick by New York Giants where he played offensive tackle and started in four games in 2003 and played football at Penn, where he was named a Division I-AA All-American in 2001
- Florian Gerard Kempf (born 1956), class of 1978: played four seasons in the National Football League for the Houston Oilers and New Orleans Saints
- Mitch Marrow (class of 1999): named All-Ivy League in '96 and '97;nd drafted by the Carolina Panthers in the 3rd round of the 1998 draft; ultimately retired due to back injuries
- Rob Milanese: Arena Football League wide receiver; school's all-time leading receiver
- Ben Noll (class of 2004): signed as an undrafted free agent by the St. Louis Rams after the 2004 NFL draft on June 18 and then played in NFL for the St. Louis Rams, Dallas Cowboys, and Detroit Lions
- Ryan O'Malley (class of 2016): rated the 15th best tight end in the 2016 NFL draft by NFLDraftScout.com, signed with the Oakland Raiders on May 10, 2016, after going undrafted in the 2016 NFL Draft
- Pete Overfield, Penn Law class of 1900: All-American at Penn and professional football player for Homestead Library team, which defeated Blondy Wallace's Philadelphia professionals 18 to 0 for the professional football championship of the United States (played at the Philadelphia park) as reported by The New York Times; federal judge in Alaska; rancher
- Walter Irving Pard Pearce (1896–1974, class of 1920): won 1921 NFL Championship playing for the Chicago Staleys (now the Chicago Bears)
- Frank Reagan: former professional football player for the New York Giants and the Philadelphia Eagles, 1941–1951; led the NFL in interceptions in 1947
- John Schweder: football player who played offensive lineman for six seasons for the Baltimore Colts and Pittsburgh Steelers
- George Sullivan: professional football player who played in 22 games, starting in 12, for the Frankford Yellow Jackets of the National Football League 1924–1925; and 8 games, starting in 6, for the Philadelphia Quakers of the American Football League during the 1926 season
- John Cochran Thurman (1900–1976; Wharton class of 1923): played tackle for the Los Angeles Buccaneers in their only season (1926) in the National Football League; at Penn received All-American honors in 1922
- Justin Tuck (Wharton School of Business; class of 2018), former NFL player, 2x Super bowl champion
- Joe Valerio: NFL pro who spent five seasons with the Kansas City Chiefs
- Blondy Wallace: college All-American, NFL pro, and bootlegger
- Justin Watson (class of 2018): NFL wide receiver and Tampa Bay Buccaneers Super Bowl LV and Kansas City Chiefs Super Bowl LVII and Super Bowl LVIII Champion
- Osbern Putnam "Diddy" Willson (1911–1961), Penn College class of 1933: guard, played three seasons with the Philadelphia Eagles of the National Football League (NFL)

=== Professional baseball players ===
- Doc Bushong, DDS University of Pennsylvania School of Dental Medicine, class of 1882: one of the first to matriculate, in 1878 in the brand-new Department of Dentistry; first graduate from any school at Penn to play in Major League baseball and since he played professional baseball during his time at Penn Dental he could not play for Penn
- Tom Cahill (1868–1894), Penn Med class of 1893, but left in 1891 and did not graduate: played one season in Major League Baseball for the Louisville Colonels
- Jake Cousins (B.A. 2017): MLB player for New York Yankees
- Mark DeRosa: San Francisco Giants infielder/outfielder; part of World Series-winning 2010 team
- Edward Stephen Doc Farrell (1901–1966), Penn class of 1924: had 10-year Major League Baseball career with teams such as the New York Giants (now the San Francisco Giants), New York Yankees and Boston Red Sox
- Charlie Ferguson (1863–1888): earned 728 strikeouts 1884–1888 as a pitcher for the Philadelphia Quakers, now the Philadelphia Phillies; in 1931, rated as the fifth-best player to that point in baseball history
- Doug Glanville, Penn Engineering class of 1992, with major in systems engineering: one of only five Penn alumni to play in Major League Baseball since 1951, and first African-American Ivy League graduate to play in the majors; received the Outstanding Pro Prospect award in 1990; New York Times op-ed columnist
- William John Billy Goeckel (1871–1922), Penn Law class of 1895: played for Penn's varsity baseball team 1893–1895 where he was "considered the finest collegiate first baseman of his day" and played portion of one season (in 1899) for the Philadelphia Phillies; organizer and attorney for the Wilkes-Barre South Side Bank and Trust Company and chairman of Wilkes-Barre's Democratic City Committee; wrote "he Red and Blue," which has since become the Penn theme song and was leader of University of Pennsylvania Glee Club
- Jim Peterson: Major League Baseball player, 1931–1937; winner of the 1931 World Series playing for the Philadelphia Athletics (now the Oakland Athletics)
- Roy Thomas: Philadelphia Phillies player and National League leader in runs scored, base on balls, and on-base percentage
- Steve Yerkes: Wharton dropout, played Major League Baseball 1909–1916 with the Boston Red Sox and the Chicago Cubs; scored the Series-winning run in the tenth inning of Game Eight of the 1912 World Series for the Red Sox
- Elwood Otto "Woody" Wagenhorst (1863–1946), Penn Law class of 1892: played Major League Baseball as a third baseman for the Philadelphia Quakers in 1888 (in two career games, he had one hit in eight at-bats), head football coach at Penn 1888–1891, compiling a record of 39–18, while a student at Penn Law, and head coach of University of Alabama in 1896 and University of Iowa in 1897

=== Fencing ===
- Cliff Bayer: foil fencer, two-time Olympian, four-time US champion, NCAA champion, Pan Am silver medalist
- Maxine Esteban: Ivorian Olympic fencer
- Paul Friedberg: Olympic fencer, three-time NCAA champion, Maccabiah Games champion
- Shaul Gordon (born 1994) (College class of 2016): Canadian-Israeli Olympic sabre fencer for Canada
- Brooke Makler (1951–2010): Olympic fencer, NCAA champion, two-time Pan American Games champion
- Paul Makler Jr. (born 1946): Olympic fencer, NCAA champion
- Paul Makler Sr. (1920–2022): Penn Med class of 1964 and Penn undergraduate class of 1944: fenced for the University of Pennsylvania Quakers, competed in the individual and team épée events at the 1952 Summer Olympics in Helsinki, won a silver medal in the team foil event at the 1955 Pan American Games, won an Amateur Fencers League of America (AFLA) national team épée title in 1956, and was president of the American Fencing Association in 1962
- David Micahnik (born 1938), Penn College class of 1960 and Penn Law class of 1964: fenced for Penn, where he was a first-team All-Ivy selection in épée as a senior, the 1960 US National Champion and competed in the individual and team épée events at the 1960, 1964 and 1968 Summer Olympics
- Chris O'Loughlin (born 1967): Olympic fencer, NCAA champion, Maccabiah Games silver medalist, Pan American Games bronze medalist

=== Rowing/crew ===
- Joe Burk (1914–2008), Wharton class of 1934 (and Penn crew coach 1950–1969): named the "world's greatest oarsman" in 1938 by winning the Diamond Challenge Sculls at the Henley Royal Regatta in 1938 (where he set a Henley course record, which was to stand for 27 years) and 1939 (beating Roger Verey in the final), such that at the end of the 1939 season, Burk was voted the James E. Sullivan Award as the country's outstanding amateur athlete (as he also won that year the Olympic tryouts [for 1940 Olympics, which were cancelled because of World War II]; the National Regatta; and the Philadelphia Challenge Cup aka The Gold Cup)
- Susan Francia: winner of gold medals as part of the women's 8-oared boat at 2008 Olympics and 2012 Olympics
- Augustus Goetz (1904–1976), Penn College class of 1925 and Penn Law class of 1929: competed in the men's coxed pair event at the 1928 Summer Olympics
- Janusz Hooker (Wharton class of 1992): won the bronze medal in Men's Quadruple Sculls for Australia at the 1996 Summer Olympics
- John B. Kelly Jr.: son of John B. Kelly Sr., winner of three medals at 1920 Summer Olympics; brother of Princess Grace of Monaco, second Penn Crew alumnus to win the James E. Sullivan Award for being nation's best amateur athlete (in 1947), winner of a bronze medal at the 1956 Summer Olympics
- Ted A. Nash (former Penn coach): 1960 (gold medal) and 1964 (bronze medal) US Olympic teams and US Olympic coach 1968–2008
- Harry Parker, class of 1957: 1960 US Olympic Team member and US Olympic coach 1964–1984
- John Anthony Pescatore: competed in the 1988 Seoul Olympic Games for the US as stroke of the men's coxed eight, who won a bronze medal; later competed at the 1992 Barcelona Olympic Games in the men's coxless pair
- Regina Salmons: member of 2021 US team

=== Other sports ===
- Sam Burley: track and field record holder
- Edward Bushnell: track and field athlete who competed at the 1900 Summer Olympics
- Danny Cepero: first Major League Soccer goalkeeper to score a goal from open play
- Grace "Sunny" Choi (born 1988), Wharton Undergrad class of 2011 BS in Economics: breakdancer for United States Olympic team at 2024 Summer Olympics in Paris, won the silver medal at World Games, and won first gold medal in breakdancing ever given at the Pan American Games; first American woman to qualify for breakdancing at the 2024 Olympics
- Frank B. Ellis, class of 1893: co-founder of the Penn Relays, the oldest and largest track and field competition in the US
- Alexander Grant: early 20th-century US and world champion and record holder in several track and field events
- Nelson Zwingluis Graves (1880–1918), class of 1903: while at Penn played cricket in 1898 for United States team in its game against Canada where he hit up 128 and in 1902 for Philadelphian cricket team where he was one of the stars for a team that beat teams in Great Britain
- Syed Mohammed Hadi (1899–1971) master's degree, class of 1926: played for India or one of its constituent states in cricket, tennis, field hockey, soccer, table tennis, chess, and polo (nicknamed "Rainbow Hadi" because of his expertise in these seven sports;) one of the first Indians to compete as a tennis player at the Olympics (1924 Summer Olympics); also represented India in the 1924 and 1925 Davis Cups
- Wallace F. Johnson: early 20th-century US tennis champion
- Florian Gerard Kempf (born 1956), class of 1978: played four seasons in the National Football League for the Houston Oilers and New Orleans Saints and soccer for the Philadelphia Fury of the North American Soccer League and the Pennsylvania Stoners of the American Soccer League
- Frank Villeneuve Nicholson: rugby player, University of Pennsylvania School of Dental Medicine (class of 1910); in 1904 captained the Australian national rugby team in its match against England and in 1906 reintroduced rugby union as a sport to Penn students
- George Patterson (class of 1888): still holds the North American batting record; starred for the professional Philadelphia Cricket Team
- Stan Startzell, class of 1972: played (a) on Penn men's soccer team 1969–1971 (where he was twice a second team All American and a first team All American in 1971 and was also second team All Ivy League as a placekicker on Penn football team in 1971) and (b) for the New York Cosmos of the North American Soccer League (who drafted Startzell in 1972 as the only native US player on the roster that season) and (c) for Philadelphia Atoms in 1973 (who won the league championship that year)
- John Borland Thayer, II (1862–1912 [due to sinking of the Titanic]), class of 1882: captain of the Penn lacrosse team in 1879, previously a member of Penn baseball team, when not playing on Penn cricket team was part of the Philadelphian side that visited England in 1884
- George C. Thomas Jr. (1873–1932), class of 1894: golf course architect, designed Whitemarsh Valley Country Club outside Philadelphia, and more than 20 courses in California
- William Bill Tilden Jr. class of 1915 (did not graduate): tennis player, won 10 Grand Slam titles, including 7 US Opens and 3 Wimbledons

=== Sports executives and owners ===
- Steve Baumann: president of the National Soccer Hall of Fame
- Bert Bell: former National Football League Commissioner 1946–1959; co-founder of the Philadelphia Eagles; past co-owner of the Pittsburgh Steelers
- David Blitzer: owner of several sports teams
- Mel Bridgman: former National Hockey League player and general manager of the Ottawa Senators
- Clarence Clark, class of 1878: first secretary of the United States Lawn Tennis Association; member of the Tennis Hall of Fame
- Steven A. Cohen: owner of New York Mets
- Joseph Dey: former executive director of the United States Golf Association; first commissioner of the PGA Tour; namesake of the Joe Dey Award sponsored by the USGA; member of the World Golf Hall of Fame
- Eddie Einhorn: vice chairman of the Chicago White Sox
- Otto Frenzel: co-owner of the Pittsburgh Penguins, 1975–1977
- Marvin Goldklang: minority owner of the New York Yankees
- Austin Gunsel: commissioner of the National Football League, 1959–1960
- Josh Harris: owner of the Philadelphia 76ers, New Jersey Devils, and Washington Commanders
- Ron Hines: co-founder of Black American Racers Association
- Ned Irish: founder and president of the New York Knicks, 1946–74; enshrined in the Naismith Memorial Basketball Hall of Fame
- Lee Joannes: president of the Green Bay Packers, 1930–1947
- Red Kellett: former president of the Baltimore Colts
- Craig Littlepage: director of athletics at the University of Virginia
- Jeff Luhnow: general manager of the Houston Astros
- Ed McCaskey: past chairman of the Chicago Bears
- David Montgomery: part-owner, president, and CEO of the Philadelphia Phillies
- Walter O'Malley: owner and chief executive of the Brooklyn/Los Angeles Dodgers; member of the Baseball Hall of Fame
- Carroll Rosenbloom: former owner of the Baltimore Colts and Los Angeles Rams
- Ed Stefanski: president and general manager of the Philadelphia 76ers
- Vernon Stouffer: former owner of the Cleveland Indians
- Lud Wray: founder of the Philadelphia Eagles with fellow Penn alumnus Bert Bell; first head coach of the Boston Braves (now the Washington Commanders)

== Business ==
For a more comprehensive list of notable alumni in the business world, see Wharton School of the University of Pennsylvania. (Note: Not all of the following individuals attended the Wharton School, but may be alumni of other schools within the University of Pennsylvania.)

=== Company founders ===
- William Bingham, class of 1768: a founder and director of the Bank of North America, the first modern US bank
- John Bogle: founder and retired CEO of The Vanguard Group
- Richard Bloch (class of 1942): co-founder, H&R Block
- Len Bosack: co-founder, Cisco Systems (Internet router company)
- David J. Brown: co-founder, Silicon Graphics
- Warren Buffett: CEO of Berkshire Hathaway, investor, second richest man in the world (attended for two years before transferring to the University of Nebraska)
- Jonathan Brassington: CEO and co-founder, LiquidHub
- William P. Carey: founder of W. P. Carey & Co. LLC, a corporate real estate financing firm headquartered in New York City
- Steven A. Cohen: founder and manager, SAC Capital Partners and Point72 Asset Management
- Catherine Austin Fitts: CEO and founder of Solari Inc., former United States Assistant Secretary of Housing and Urban Development for Housing
- John Grayken: founder and chairman, Lone Star Funds
- James Dinan: hedge fund manager and founder of York Capital Management
- Sam Hamadeh: founder, Vault Inc. and film producer
- Brad Handler: co-founder and chairman, Inspirato; first in-house attorney at eBay
- Josh Harris: co-founder, Apollo Global Management
- Gilbert W. Harrison: founder, chairman and CEO, Financo, Inc.
- Vernon Hill: founder, chairman, and CEO, Commerce Bancorp
- Jon Huntsman Sr.: billionaire, founder of the Huntsman Corporation
- Charlie Javice: founder, Frank; notably convicted in high-profile fraud case
- Josh Kopelman: founder, Half.com
- Kartik Kumra: fashion designer, founder of Kartik Research
- Geraldine Laybourne: founder, Oxygen Media
- Douglas Lenat: founder, artificial intelligence company Cycorp
- Michael R. Levy: founder and publisher of Texas Monthly magazine
- Ronald Li: founder and past chairman, the Hong Kong Stock Exchange
- Ken Moelis: founder, Moelis & Company
- Elon Musk: technology entrepreneur; founder, CEO and CTO of SpaceX; co-founder of PayPal; board member of Planetary Society; investor and chairman of the board of Tesla Motors
- Peter Nicholas: billionaire co-founder of the medical device firm Boston Scientific
- William Novelli: CEO, AARP; founder and past president, Porter Novelli, one of the world's largest lobbying and public relations firms, now part of the Omnicom Group
- William S. Paley: founder, CBS Corporation
- Stephen M. Peck: investor and philanthropist, co-founder of Weiss, Peck & Greer
- Mark Pincus: co-founder, Zynga (class of 1988)
- J.D. Power III: founder of marketing research firm J.D. Power & Associates
- Raj Rajaratnam: billionaire founder of the hedge fund Galleon Group
- Josh Resnick: founder and president, Pandemic Studios
- Ralph J. Roberts: co-founder, Comcast Corporation
- Michael Tiemann: co-founder, Cygnus Solutions (a GNU software company), now CTO of Red Hat
- Edward Rosenthal: founder, Riverside Memorial Chapel
- Henry Salvatori: founder, Western Geophysical; founding stockholder of the National Review magazine
- Harry Scherman: co-founder, Book of the Month Club
- Tanya Seaman: co-founder, PhillyCarShare
- Joseph Segel: founder, QVC and Franklin Mint
- Brian Sheth: co-founder and president, Vista Equity Partners
- Gregg Spiridellis: founder, JibJab Media, Inc.
- Michael Steinhardt: co-founder, hedge fund Steinhardt, Fine, Berkowitz & Co.; philanthropist
- Marc Turtletaub: founder of Big Beach
- Miranda Wang: co-founder, plastic recycler Novoloop

=== Other entrepreneurs and business leaders ===
- Laura J. Alber: president and CEO, Williams-Sonoma, Inc.
- Anil Ambani: billionaire, chairman, Anil Dhirubhai Ambani Group
- Walter Annenberg: billionaire publisher; philanthropist; former U.S. ambassador to the United Kingdom; awarded the Presidential Medal of Freedom; given the rank of Knight Commander (the second-highest rank in the Order of the British Empire) by Queen Elizabeth II
- Susan Arnold: past chairman of the Walt Disney Company; past vice-chairman of Procter & Gamble
- Morton J. Baum: president, Hickey Freeman
- David Bell: past chairman of the Financial Times
- Nariman Behravesh (born 1948): economist
- Alfred Berkeley: former president and vice-chairman, NASDAQ Stock Market, Inc.
- Nicholas Biddle: president, Second Bank of the United States
- Norman Blackwell, Baron Blackwell: chairman, Interserve and Lloyds Banking Group
- Matt Blank: chairman and CEO, Showtime
- Mitchell Blutt: executive partner, J.P. Morgan Chase
- Christopher Browne: past managing director, Tweedy, Browne Co.
- Charles Butt: billionaire, CEO and chairman, H-E-B Grocery Company
- Robert Castellini: CEO and part-owner of the Cincinnati Reds baseball team
- Arthur D. Collins Jr.: chairman and CEO, Medtronic
- Stephen Cooper: CEO, Warner Music Group
- Robert Crandall: chairman and CEO, American Airlines, Inc
- Donny Deutsch: chairman, Deutsch, Inc.
- Michael DiCandilo: chief financial officer and executive vice president, AmerisourceBergen corporation
- Alexis Irénée du Pont Jr.: business executive for DuPont
- Eugene du Pont: first head of modern-day DuPont
- Mike Eskew: chairman and CEO, UPS
- Jay S. Fishman: chairman and CEO, The Travelers Companies
- Robert B. Goergen: chairman and CEO, Blyth, Inc.
- Steven Goldstone: former chairman and CEO, RJR Nabisco
- Joel Greenblatt: hedge fund manager and author
- George H. Heilmeier: former president and CEO, Bellcore (now Telcordia)
- Charles A. Heimbold Jr.: US ambassador to Sweden, former chairman and CEO, Bristol-Myers Squibb Company
- C. Robert Henrikson: chairman, president and CEO, MetLife
- Lauren Hobart: president and CEO, Dick's Sporting Goods
- Philip B. Hofmann: past chairman and CEO, Johnson & Johnson
- Jirair Hovnanian: home builder
- Alberto Ibargüen: president and CEO of the John S. and James L. Knight Foundation in Miami, Florida; former publisher of the Miami Herald
- John Carmichael Jenkins: planter and proponent of slavery in the Antebellum South
- Reginald H. Jones: former chairman and CEO, General Electric
- Yotaro Kobayashi: chairman and co-CEO, Fuji Xerox
- Kong Dongmei: Chinese entrepreneur; granddaughter of the founder of the People's Republic of China Mao Zedong
- Leonard Lauder: chairman and CEO, Estée Lauder; billionaire investor
- Terry Leahy: CEO, Tesco
- Gerald Levin: former CEO, AOL Time Warner
- Edward J. Lewis: former chairman of the board of the Oxford Development Company, one of the largest Pennsylvania-based real estate firms
- George Lindemann: billionaire industrialist
- Joseph Wharton Lippincott: past president and chairman of the board of J. B. Lippincott Company, and grandson of industrialist Joseph Wharton, founder of the Wharton School of Business
- Robert Litzenberger: partner, Goldman Sachs
- Betty Liu: executive vice chairman, New York Stock Exchange
- John A. Luke Jr.: chairman and chief executive officer, MeadWestvaco Corporation
- Peter Lynch: investor; vice chairman, Fidelity Investments
- Harold McGraw III: president and CEO, McGraw-Hill Companies; chairman of Business Roundtable
- Michael Milken: trader, financier, pardoned felon
- Bill Miller: chairman and chief investment officer, Legg Mason Capital Management
- Jordan Mintz: Enron whistleblower
- Aditya Mittal: president and CFO, Mittal Steel Company
- Michael Moritz: venture capitalist, Sequoia Capital
- Michael H. Moskow: 8th president and CEO, Federal Reserve Bank of Chicago
- Laxman Narasimhan: former CEO, Starbucks Corporation
- Phebe Novakovic: chairman and CEO, General Dynamics
- Bruce Pasternack: president and CEO, Special Olympics International; former senior vice president of Booz Allen Hamilton Inc.
- Ronald O. Perelman: billionaire investor
- Benjamin W. Perkins Jr.: Thoroughbred racehorse trainer
- Douglas L. Peterson: CEO, McGraw Hill Financial
- Lionel Pincus: past chairman, Warburg Pincus
- Lewis E. Platt: president, CEO and chairman of the board, Hewlett-Packard
- Edmund T. Pratt Jr.: former chairman and CEO, Pfizer, Inc.
- Frank Quattrone: prominent investment banker, formerly with Credit Suisse First Boston
- Robert Rabinovitch: former president and CEO, Canadian Broadcasting Corporation
- Sylvia Rhone: former president and CEO, Eastwest Records, Elektra Records, and Motown Records; first Black woman to head a major record company
- Rich Riley: CEO, Shazam; former senior vice president and managing director of Yahoo! Europe, Middle East & Africa
- James O. Robbins: president and CEO, Cox Communications
- Brian L. Roberts: chairman and CEO, Comcast Corporation
- John P. Roberts: entrepreneur who bankrolled the Woodstock Festival
- Lucille Roberts, College for Women, class of 1964: namesake and proprietor of women's fitness clubs
- Eileen Clarkin Rominger: Goldman Sachs partner
- Frank Rooney: past CEO, Melville Corporation
- Harold Rosen: executive director, Grassroots Business Fund
- Arthur Ross: businessman and philanthropist
- Perry Rotella: senior vice president and CIO, Verisk Analytics
- J. Brendan Ryan: chairman, Foote, Cone, and Belding
- Charles S. Sanford Jr.: CEO, Bankers Trust
- Alan D. Schnitzer: CEO, the Travelers Companies
- John Sculley: former president, PepsiCo; former CEO, Apple Computer
- Paul V. Scura: former executive vice president and head of the investment bank of Prudential Securities
- Mike Sievert, Wharton School of the University of Pennsylvania (class of 1991): CEO, T-Mobile US
- Henry Silverman: COO of the Apollo Group, formerly head of Cendant Corporation
- Young Sohn: president and chief strategy officer, Samsung Electronics
- Richard Stearns: president, World Vision
- Patrick J. Talamantes: CEO, McClatchy Company
- John Ternus: CEO, Apple Inc.
- Brian Tierney: publisher of The Philadelphia Inquirer and the Philadelphia Daily News
- Donald Trump Jr.: executive of The Trump Organization, son of US president and Penn alumnus Donald Trump
- Ivanka Trump: fashion model; businesswoman; judge of NBC reality show The Apprentice 6; daughter of US president and Penn alumnus Donald Trump
- James S. Tisch: CEO, Loews Corporation
- Laurence Tisch: former CEO of CBS
- Roy Vagelos: former CEO, Merck
- James L. Vincent: past president and CEO, Biogen Idec
- George Herbert Walker IV, college and undergraduate class of 1991 and Wharton School of the University of Pennsylvania Graduate School class of 1992: Benjamin Franklin Scholar, graduated Phi Beta Kappa and received a dual degree – a B.S. and a B.A., both summa cum laude, received an MBA as a Palmer Scholar; received Harry S. Truman Scholarship, member of St. Anthony Hall fraternity; CEO of Neuberger Berman; former managing director of Lehman Brothers; former partner with Goldman Sachs & Co; co-president, Commodities Corporation
- Jacob Wallenberg: chairman, Investor
- Jeff Weiner: CEO, LinkedIn
- Dawne Williams: former CEO, St. Kitts-Nevis-Anguilla National Bank
- Joseph P. Williams: creator of the first all-purpose bank credit card, BankAmericard (now Visa)
- Gary L. Wilson: CEO and chairman, Northwest Airlines
- William Wrigley Jr. II: chairman and former CEO, Wm. Wrigley Jr. Company
- Steve Wynn: chairman and CEO Wynn Resorts; former chairman and CEO, Mirage Resorts, Inc.; responsible for the renaissance of Las Vegas
- Morrie Yohai: co-creator of Cheez Doodles
- Mark Zandi: economist
- Mortimer Zuckerman: real estate billionaire; publisher/owner of the New York Daily News; editor-in-chief, U.S. News & World Report
- Martin Zweig: stock investor and author

=== Exploration ===
- Robert Adams Jr.: Penn graduate; served as a botanist with Penn professor Ferdinand Vandeveer Hayden while exploring the northwest corner of Wyoming; their efforts led directly to the founding of Yellowstone National Park, the first national park in the United States
- Michael L. Gernhardt (Penn Engineering class of 1983 (master's) and 1991 (Ph.D.) in Bioengineering): NASA astronaut
- Charles Guillou: member of the 19th-century United States Exploring Expedition
- Isaac Israel Hayes: 19th-century Arctic explorer; Heiss Island in Franz Josef Land (Russia) was named in his honor
- Elisha Kane: Arctic explorer, received medals from the United States Congress, the Royal Geographical Society, and the Société de Géographie for his work; namesake of the naval destroyer USS Kane
- Garrett Reisman (Penn class of 1991): dual bachelor's degrees from Wharton and Engineering schools via the Jerome Fisher Program in Management and Technology; NASA Space Shuttle astronaut

== Government, politics, and law ==
=== Colonial American leaders ===
==== Members of the Continental Congress ====
- Andrew Allen (College class of 1759): Pennsylvania delegate to the Continental Congress, 1775–1776
- William Bingham (College class of 1768): Pennsylvania delegate to the Continental Congress, 1786–1788
- Elias Boudinot (attended the Academy, but did not earn a college degree): New Jersey delegate to the Continental Congress, 1778 and 1781–1783, and president of the Continental Congress in 1782–1783
- Lambert Cadwalader (College class of 1760, but did not graduate): New Jersey delegate to the Continental Congress, 1784–1787
- Tench Coxe (attended in the 1770s but did not graduate): Pennsylvania delegate to the Continental Congress, 1788–1789 (and author of many contributions to The Federalist Papers advocating for the ratification of United States Constitution)
- Philemon Dickinson (College class of 1759): Delaware delegate to the Continental Congress, 1782–1783
- Jonathan Elmer (Medical School class of 1769 (bachelor's) and class of 1771 (doctor's degree)): New Jersey delegate to the Continental Congress, 1777–1778, 1781–1783, 1787–1788
- Robert Goldsborough (College class of 1760): Maryland delegate to the Continental Congress, 1774–1776
- William Grayson (College class of 1760, but did not graduate): Virginia delegate to the Continental Congress, 1785–1787
- Whitmell Hill (College class of 1760): North Carolina delegate to the Continental Congress, 1778–1780 accessed November 4, 2021
- William Hindman (College class of 1761, but did not graduate): Maryland delegate to the Continental Congress, 1785–1786
- Francis Hopkinson (College class of 1757 with bachelor's and class of 1760 with master's degree): New Jersey delegate to the Continental Congress, 1776, who signed Declaration of Independence
- David Jackson (Medical School class of 1768): Pennsylvania delegate to the Continental Congress, 1785
- Henry Latimer (College class of 1770): Delaware delegate to the Continental Congress, 1784
- Thomas Mifflin (College class of 1760, trustee 1773–1791, and treasurer 1773–1775): Pennsylvania delegate to the Continental Congress, 1774–1775 and 1782–1784, and president of the Continental Congress, 1783–1784
- Samuel Cadwalader Morris (College class of 1760): Pennsylvania delegate to the Continental Congress, 1783–1784
- Richard Peters (College class of 1761): Pennsylvania delegate to the Continental Congress, 1782–1783
- David Ramsay (Medical School class of 1773 and honorary doctorate class of 1780): South Carolina delegate to the Continental Congress, 1782–1783 and 1785–1786, and acting president of the Continental Congress in 1785–1786
- Joshua Seney (College class of 1773): Maryland delegate to the Continental Congress, 1778
- Jonathan Sergeant (College class of 1763): New Jersey delegate to the Continental Congress, 1776–1777
- James Tilton (Medical School class of 1768 (bachelor's) and 1771 (doctor's degree)): Delaware delegate to the Continental Congress, 1783–1784
- Hugh Williamson (College class of 1757): North Carolina delegate to the Continental Congress, 1782–1785, 1787–1788

==== Signers of the US Constitution and/or Declaration of Independence ====
Sources: University of Pennsylvania Archives

- George Clymer, Penn trustee 1779–1813: elected member of the Continental Congress who was one of only six people who signed Declaration of Independence and signed (for Pennsylvania) US Constitution
- Thomas FitzSimons, Penn trustee 1789–1811: signed (for Pennsylvania) US Constitution
- Benjamin Franklin, Penn founder and trustee 1749–1790: one of only six people who signed Declaration of Independence and signed (for Pennsylvania) US Constitution
- Francis Hopkinson, Penn degrees A.B. 1757; A.M. 1760; LL.D. 1790; Penn trustee 1787–1791: signed Declaration of Independence
- Jared Ingersoll, Penn trustee 1778–1791: signed US Constitution
- Robert Morris, Penn trustee 1778–1791: one of only six people who signed Declaration of Independence and signed (for Pennsylvania) US Constitution
- Thomas McKean, Penn degrees: A.M. (hon.) 1763 and LL.D. 1785; Penn trustee 1779–1817; president of Penn Board of Trustees: signed Declaration of Independence
- Thomas Mifflin, Penn degree: A.B. 1760; Pennsylvania delegate to the Continental Congress and president of the Continental Congress; 1st governor of Pennsylvania; signed US Constitution
- William Paca, Penn degrees: A.B. 1759 and A.M. 1762; Penn trustee; Maryland delegate to the Continental Congress, 1774–79; signed Declaration of Independence; chief justice of Maryland (1788–1790)
- Benjamin Rush, Penn Med class of 1766; Penn Med professor 1769–1813: signed Declaration of Independence
- Hugh Williamson, Penn degrees: A.B. 1757, A.M. 1760, and LL.D. (hon.) 1787; tutor 1755–1758; Penn professor of mathematics 1761–1763: North Carolina delegate to the Continental Congress, signed US Constitution; representative to US Congress
- James Wilson, Penn degrees A.M. (hon.) 1766 and LL.D. 1790; Penn trustee; delegate to Continental Congress; signed Declaration of Independence and signed (for Pennsylvania) US Constitution, the first draft of which he wrote; US Supreme Court justice

=== United States government ===
==== Presidents of the United States ====
- William Henry Harrison (Penn Med during 1791 but did not graduate): 9th president of the United States
- Donald Trump, graduate of Wharton School of Finance (B.S. 1968): 45th and 47th president of the United States

==== Members of the United States Cabinet (or top-level executive branch) ====
- Robert S. Adler, College class of 1966: commissioner (and acting chair, 2013–2013) of the US Consumer Product Safety Commission
- Neil Barofsky (born 1970), Wharton Undergraduate class of 1992: special Treasury Department inspector general who supervised the Troubled Assets Relief Program
- Richard E. Besser, Penn Medical School class of 1986: served as acting director of the Centers for Disease Control
- Adolph E. Borie: US secretary of the Navy under President Ulysses S. Grant
- William Bradford: United States attorney general under President George Washington
- David Brailer: National Resource Center for Health Information Technology Coordinator; the "health information czar" under President George W. Bush
- Kenneth Braithwaite: US secretary of the Navy under President Donald J. Trump, earned a master's degree in government administration from Penn, Fels Institute of Government, in 1995
- William H. Brown, III: past chairman of the US Equal Employment Opportunity Commission
- Shirley Chater: commissioner of Social Security, 1993–97
- Richard A. Clarke: national counter-terrorism director under presidents Bill Clinton and George W. Bush
- Jay Clayton (Penn Engineering class of 1988 and Penn Law class of 1993): director of National Intelligence under President Donald Trump, 2026-, 32nd chairman of the Securities and Exchange Commission under President Donald Trump
- William T. Coleman Jr.: US secretary of transportation, 1975–1977, and recipient of the Presidential Medal of Freedom
- Alexander J. Dallas (1759–1817), Penn trustee (1794–1817): 6th United States secretary of the treasury 1814–1816 was acting United States secretary of war (March 2, 1815 – August 1, 1815) and for portion of 1815 was also acting United States secretary of state; previously U.S. attorney for the Eastern District of Pennsylvania (1801–1814)
- John Howard Dalton (Wharton Graduate School class of 1971, MBA): served as 70th secretary of the Navy 1993–1998
- John DiIulio: first director of the White House Office of Faith-Based and Community Initiatives under President George W. Bush
- George Hall Dixon: deputy secretary of the treasury under President Gerald Ford
- George Nicholas Eckert: director of the United States Mint, 1851–1853
- Myer Feldman: White House counsel to presidents John F. Kennedy and Lyndon Johnson
- William R. Ferris: chairman of the National Endowment for the Humanities, 1997–2000
- Thomas K. Finletter: US secretary of the Air Force, 1950–1953
- Lindley M. Garrison: secretary of war under President Woodrow Wilson
- Thomas S. Gates Jr. (Penn College class of 1928, A.B., and Hon. LL.D., 1956, trustee): 7th United States Secretary of Defense (1959–1961) and Secretary of the Navy
- Henry Dilworth Gilpin: US attorney general under President Martin Van Buren
- Earl G. Harrison: dean of the University of Pennsylvania Law School; commissioner of the United States Immigration and Naturalization Service, 1942–1944
- Francis J. Harvey (born 1943), Penn Graduate School of Arts and Sciences class of 1969, Ph.D. in Metallurgical Engineering and Materials Science: 19th Secretary of the United States Army 2004–2007
- Kevin Hassett: senior advisor to the president under Donald Trump
- Henry Hoyt: Penn Law class of 1881: US solicitor general, 1903–1909
- George A. Jenks, class of 1850 and 1853: US solicitor general, 1886–89
- Neel Kashkari: head of the Office of Financial Stability in the US Department of the Treasury
- Virginia Knauer (1915–2011), class of 1937: first director of the Office of Consumer Affairs under President Ronald Reagan, and special assistant to the president for consumer affairs under President Richard Nixon (1969–1977 and 1981–1989) and started her political career in 1959 when she became the first Republican woman to be elected to the Philadelphia City Council
- C. Everett Koop (University of Pennsylvania Medical School class of 1947 Doctor of Science degree in medicine): surgeon general, 1981–1989
- John F. Lehman: US Secretary of the Navy under President Ronald Reagan
- William Flynn Martin: deputy secretary of energy and executive secretary of the National Security Council under President Reagan
- Ann Dore McLaughlin: US secretary of labor
- William M. Meredith, College class of 1812, Graduate School class of 1816: appointed by President Zachary Taylor as 19th United States Secretary of the Treasury (1849–1850)
- Samuel Moore: director, United States Mint, 1824–1935
- David W. Ogden: deputy attorney general under President Barack Obama
- William Tod Otto: deputy secretary of the interior under President Abraham Lincoln, 1863–1871
- Frances Perkins (Wharton School class of 1908, no degree): served as the 4th United States secretary of labor 1933–1945, the longest serving labor secretary and the first woman ever to serve in a presidential cabinet; instrumental in developing the Social Security system
- Shira Perlmutter (Penn Law class of 1983): 14th Register of Copyrights
- Thomas M. Pettit: class of 1815 (A.B.) and class of 1818 (A.M.): 8th director of the United States Mint, term started in March 1853 and ended when he died in office in April 1853
- Caesar Augustus Rodney: US attorney general 1807–1811 under presidents Thomas Jefferson and James Madison; US senator (Delaware)
- Melissa Rogers: Penn Law class of 1991, director of the White House Office of Faith-Based and Community Initiatives under President Joe Biden
- Philip H. Rosenfelt: United States Secretary of Education under president Joe Biden
- Rajiv Shah: under secretary of agriculture for Research, Education, and Economics and administrator of the United States Agency for International Development (USAID) under President Barack Obama
- David Shulkin (Penn Med Alumnus who was Robert Wood Johnson Foundation Clinical Scholar): 9th United States Secretary of Veterans Affairs
- Gene Sperling: director of the National Economic Council under President Barack Obama
- Clifford L. Stanley: under secretary of defense for personnel and readiness under President Barack Obama
- Benjamin Stoddert: first US secretary of the Navy (attended but did not earn a degree)
- Rexford Tugwell: head of the Resettlement Administration and part of Franklin D. Roosevelt's "Brain Trust"
- Michael G. Vickers: assistant secretary of defense for Special Operations and Low-Intensity Conflict; Central Intelligence Agency's principal strategist in paramilitary operation to drive the Soviets out of Afghanistan
- Katherine Kathi Vidal (née Kelly) (Penn Law class of 1996) serves (as of June 2022) as Under Secretary of Commerce for Intellectual Property and Director of the United States Patent and Trademark Office (USPTO)
- Robert John Walker (1801–1869; class of 1819): US senator from Mississippi (1835–1845), secretary of the treasury (1845–1849), and territorial governor of Kansas (1857); responsible for drafting the 1849 bill that eventually established the United States Department of the Interior
- George W. Wickersham: US attorney general, 1909–1913
- George Washington Woodruff: acting secretary of the interior under Theodore Roosevelt
- Hubert Work: United States postmaster general, 1922–1923 under President Warren G. Harding, and US secretary of the interior, 1923–1928, under Harding and President Calvin Coolidge

==== United States senators ====
As of May 2020, 31 Penn alumni have served as senators of 16 states:

- Lewis Heisler Ball: US senator from Delaware, 1903–1905, 1919–1925; Delaware representative to the US Congress, 1901–1903
- Ephraim Bateman: US senator and congressman from New Jersey
- William Wyatt Bibb: US senator and US representative from Georgia; governor of Alabama
- William Bingham, class of 1768: namesake of Binghamton, New York, and Bingham, Maine; US senator from Pennsylvania, 1795–1801 and President pro tem of the Senate; Pennsylvania delegate to the Continental Congress, 1786–88
- Clayton Douglass Buck: US senator from Delaware, 1943–1949; governor of Delaware, 1929–1937; attended Towne School of Engineering but did not earn a degree
- Joseph Maull Carey: US senator from Wyoming, 1890–1895; governor of Wyoming, 1911–1915; Wyoming delegate to the US Congress, 1885–90
- Henry H. Chambers, Penn Med class of 1811: US senator from Alabama 1825–26
- Joseph Sill Clark: US senator from Pennsylvania, 1957–1969
- Simon Barclay Conover: US senator from Florida, 1873–1979; attended School of Medicine and graduated from the University of Nashville
- George Robertson Dennis: US senator from Maryland, 1873–1879
- Philemon Dickinson: US senator from New Jersey, 1790–1793
- James Henderson Duff: US senator from Pennsylvania, 1951–1957; attended law school but did not earn a degree
- Henry A. Du Pont: US senator from Delaware, 1906–1917, attended Penn and graduated from the United States Military Academy at West Point
- Jonathan Elmer: US senator from New Jersey, 1789–1791
- William Grayson: US senator from Virginia, 1789–1790; attended College of Philadelphia but did not earn a degree
- William Henry Harrison: US senator from Ohio, 1825–1828
- Weldon Brinton Heyburn: US senator from Idaho, 1903–1912
- William Hindman: US senator from Maryland, 1800–01; attended College of Philadelphia but did not earn a degree
- Ted Kaufman: US senator from Delaware, 2009–2011
- Henry Latimer: US senator from Delaware, 1795–1801; Delaware representative to the US Congress,
- Lewis Fields Linn: US senator from Missouri, 1833–1843; attended School of Medicine but did not earn a degree
- James Murray Mason (College class of 1818): US senator from Virginia in the early 19th century
- Gouverneur Morris: New York delegate to the Continental Congress, 1778–1779; US senator from New York, 1800–1803; attended Academy of Philadelphia but did not graduate
- John Peter Gabriel Muhlenberg: US senator from Pennsylvania, 1801; Pennsylvania representative to the US Congress, 1789–1791, 1793–1795, 1799–1801; attended College of Philadelphia but did not earn a degree
- Arnold Naudain: US senator from Delaware, 1830–1836
- George Wharton Pepper: US senator from Pennsylvania, chronicler of the Senate
- Caesar Augustus Rodney: US senator from Delaware, 1822–1823
- Arlen Specter: former US senator from Pennsylvania, former Philadelphia district attorney
- John Selby Spence: US senator from Pennsylvania 1836–1840; attended School of Medicine but did not earn a degree
- Robert John Walker, class of 1819: US senator from Mississippi, 1836–1845; introduced the bill that established the US Department of the Interior
- Joseph Rodman West: US senator from Louisiana, 1871–1877; attended the college but did not earn a degree

==== United States representatives ====
As of December 2024, at least 163 representatives from 22 states have been affiliated with Penn as detailed below:

- Ephraim Leister Acker M.D., 1852 LL.B., 1886: Pennsylvania representative to the US Congress, 1871–1873
- Robert Adams Jr. (class of 1869; member of St. Anthony Hall fraternity): Republican member of the US House of Representatives for Pennsylvania's 2nd congressional district 1893–1906 (also Envoy Extraordinary and Minister Plenipotentiary to Brazil 1889–1890; member of the Pennsylvania State Senate for the 6th district 1883–1885)
- Wilbur L. Adams: Delaware representative to the US Congress, 1933–1935
- John Archer: Maryland representative to the US Congress, 1801–1807
- James Armstrong: Pennsylvania representative to the US Congress, 1793–1795
- L. Heisler Ball: Delaware representative to the US Congress, 1901–1903
- Ephraim Bateman: New Jersey representative to the US Congress, 1826–1829
- John Milton Bernhisel: Utah delegate to the US Congress, 1851–1859, 1861–1863
- George A. Bicknell: Indiana representative to the US Congress, 1877–1881
- Richard Biddle, class of 1811: Pennsylvania representative to the US Congress, 1837–1840
- Andrew Biemiller: Wisconsin representative to the US Congress, 1945–1947 (attended the Graduate School but did not earn a degree)
- Elias Boudinot: New Jersey representative to the US Congress, 1789–1795; New Jersey delegate to the Continental Congress, 1778; attended Academy of Philadelphia but did not graduate
- Benjamin Markley Boyer: Pennsylvania representative to the US Congress, 1865–1869
- Samuel Carey Bradshaw: Pennsylvania representative to the US Congress, 1855–1857
- Charles Browne (1875–1947; Penn Med class of 1900): represented New Jersey's 4th congressional district, 1923–1925
- George Franklin Brumm: Pennsylvania representative to the US Congress, 1923–1927, 1929–1934
- Hiram R. Burton: Delaware representative to the US Congress, 1905–1909
- John Cadwalader: Pennsylvania representative to the US Congress, 1855–1857
- Lambert Cadwalader: Pennsylvania representative to the US Congress, 1789–1791, 1793–1795; Pennsylvania delegate to the Continental Congress, 1784–1787; entered College of Philadelphia in 1757 but did not earn a degree
- Greene Washington Caldwell: North Carolina representative to the US Congress, 1841–1843
- Joseph Maull Carey: Wyoming representative after statehood and delegate (before statehood) to the US Congress, 1885–1890
- Matt Cartwright: Pennsylvania representative to the US Congress, 2013–25
- E. Wallace Chadwick: Pennsylvania representative to the US Congress, 1947–1949
- Earl Chudoff: Pennsylvania representative to the US Congress 1949–1958
- George Bosworth Churchill: Massachusetts representative to the US Congress, 1925; attended graduate school 1892–1894, but did not earn a degree
- John Claiborne: Virginia representative to the US Congress, 1805–1808
- John Daniel Clardy: Kentucky representative to the US Congress, 1895–1899
- Isaiah Dunn Clawson: New Jersey representative to the US Congress, 1855–1859
- John Clopton: Virginia representative to the US Congress, 1795–1799, 1801–1816
- Bill Cobey: North Carolina representative to the US Congress, 1985–1987
- Lewis Condict: New Jersey representative to the US Congress, 1811–1817
- Joel Cook: Pennsylvania representative to the US Congress 1907–1911
- Thomas Buchecker Cooper: Pennsylvania representative to the US Congress, 1861–1862
- James Harry Covington: Maryland representative to the US Congress, 1909–1914
- William Radford Coyle: Pennsylvania representative to the US Congress, 1925–1927, 1929–1933; attended law school but did not earn a degree
- George William Crump (Penn Med class of 1812, did not graduate): member of the United States House of Representatives in the 19th United States Congress (1826–1827), US ambassador to Chile
- Willard S. Curtin (1905–1996; Penn Law School class of 1932): Pennsylvania representative to US Congress, 1957–1967
- J. Burrwood Daly: Pennsylvania representative to the US Congress, 1935–1939; attended law school but did not earn a degree
- William Darlington: Pennsylvania representative to the US Congress, 1815–1817 and 1819–1823
- Philemon Dickerson: New Jersey representative to the US Congress, 1833–1836 and 1839–1841
- Charles Djou: Hawaii representative to the US Congress, 2010
- Frank Joseph Gerard Dorsey: Pennsylvania representative to the US Congress, 1935–1939
- Charles F. Dougherty: Pennsylvania representative to the US Congress, 1979–1983
- George Eckert: Pennsylvania representative to the US Congress, 1847–1849
- Norman Eddy: Indiana representative to the US Congress, 1853–1855
- Joshua Eilberg (Wharton Undergrad class of 1941, BS in Econ): Pennsylvania representative to the US Congress, 1967–1979
- Lucius Elmer: New Jersey representative to the US Congress, 1843–1845
- Phillip Sheridan English: Pennsylvania representative to the US Congress, 1995–2009
- Thomas Dunn English: New Jersey representative to the US Congress, 1891–1895
- Chaka Fattah: US congressman representing 2nd Congressional district of Pennsylvania (Philadelphia region)
- Clare G. Fenerty: Pennsylvania representative to the US Congress, 1935–1937
- John Floyd: Virginia representative to the US Congress, 1817–29,
- Harold Ford Jr.: US representative from Tennessee, candidate for House minority leader, 2002, candidate for United States Senate from Tennessee
- Vito Fossella: New York representative to the US Congress, 1997–2009
- Oliver W. Frey: Pennsylvania representative to the US Congress, 1933–1939
- Benjamin Gilman: New York representative to the US Congress, 1973–2003
- Benjamin Golder: Pennsylvania representative to the US Congress, 1925–1933
- Josh Gottheimer: New Jersey representative to the US Congress, 2017–
- George Scott Graham: Pennsylvania representative to the US Congress, 1913–1931
- John Hahn: Pennsylvania representative to the US Congress, 1815–1817
- William Henry Harrison: Ohio representative to the US Congress, 1816–1819
- Charles Eaton Haynes: Georgia representative to the US Congress, 1825–1831 and 1835–1839
- James C. Healey: Pennsylvania representative to the US Congress, 1956–1965
- William Hindman: Maryland representative to the US Congress, 1793–1799
- George Holcombe: New Jersey representative to the US Congress, 1821–1828
- Trey Hollingsworth: Indiana representative to the US Congress, 2017–
- Joseph Hopkinson, class of 1786: Pennsylvania representative to the US Congress, 1815–1819
- Charles R. Howell, attended in 1936 and 1937, did not graduate: represented New Jersey's 4th congressional district in the United States House of Representatives, 1949–1955
- John William Jones: Georgia representative to the US Congress, 1847–1849
- Owen Jones: Pennsylvania representative to the US Congress, 1857–1859
- Albert Walter Johnson: Pennsylvania representative to the US Congress, 1947–1963
- Joseph Jorgensen: Virginia representative to the US Congress, 1877–1883
- James Kelly: Pennsylvania representative to the US Congress, 1805–1809
- William Kennedy: North Carolina representative to the US Congress, 1803–1805, 1809–1811, 1813–1815
- Everett Kent: Pennsylvania representative to the US Congress, 1923–1925 and 1927–1929
- Karl C. King: Pennsylvania representative to the US Congress, 1951–1957
- William Huntington Kirkpatrick: Pennsylvania representative to the US Congress, 1921–1923
- Thomas Kittera: Pennsylvania representative to the US Congress, 1826–27
- John A. Lafore Jr.: Pennsylvania representative to the US Congress, 1957–1961
- Conor Lamb: Pennsylvania representative to the US Congress, 2018–2023
- Henry Latimer: Delaware representative to the US Congress, 1794–95
- Caleb Layton: Delaware representative to the US Congress, 1919–1923
- James Leech: Pennsylvania representative to the US Congress, 1927–1932
- William Eckart Lehman: Pennsylvania representative to the US Congress, 1861–1863
- George Leiper: Pennsylvania representative to the US Congress, 1829–1831
- John Thomas Lenahan: Pennsylvania representative to the US Congress, 1907–1909
- Samuel Lilly: New Jersey representative to the US Congress, 1853–1855
- Lloyd Lowndes Jr.: Maryland representative to the US Congress, 1873–1875
- James McDevitt Magee: Pennsylvania representative to the US Congress, 1923–1927
- Levi Maish: Pennsylvania representative to the US Congress, 1875–1879 and 1887–1891
- Francis Mallory: Virginia representative to the US Congress, 1837–1843
- John Hartwell Marable: Tennessee representative to the US Congress, 1825–1829
- Marjorie Margolies-Mezvinsky (College for Women class of 1963): representative of Pennsylvania's 13th congressional district to the US Congress, 1993–1995
- Robert Marion: South Carolina representative to the US Congress, 1805–1810
- Alexander Keith Marshall: Kentucky representative to the US Congress, 1855–1857
- James Murray Mason: Virginia representative to the US Congress, 1837–1839
- Samuel K. McConnell Jr.: Pennsylvania representative to the US Congress, 1944–1957
- George Deardorff McCreary: Pennsylvania representative to the US Congress, 1903–1913
- Joseph McDade: Pennsylvania representative to the US Congress, 1963–1999
- Robert C. McEwen: New York representative to the US Congress, 1965–1981
- John Miller: New York representative to the US Congress, 1825–1827
- James Milnor: Pennsylvania representative to the US Congress, 1811–1813
- Dave Min: Wharton Undergrad class of 1999, BSE, and Penn College BA, class of 1999: elected representative to the US Congress for California, 2025
- George Mitchell: Maryland representative to the US Congress, 1823–1827 and 1829–1832
- John Moffet: Pennsylvania representative to the US Congress, 1869
- Samuel Moore: Pennsylvania representative to the US Congress, 1818–1822
- Edward Joy Morris: Pennsylvania representative to the US Congress, 1843–1845 and 1857–1861
- Frederick Augustus Muhlenberg: Pennsylvania representative to the US Congress, 1947–1949, architect, founder of Muhlenberg Greene Architects
- Frederick Augustus Conrad Muhlenberg (trustee 1779–1786): speaker of the United States House of Representatives, 1789–1791, 1793–1795; Pennsylvania delegate to the Continental Congress, 1779–1780; Pennsylvania representative to the US Congress, 1789–1797
- Edward de Veaux Morrell: Pennsylvania representative to the US Congress, 1900–1907
- John Murphy: Pennsylvania representative to the US Congress, 1943–1946
- Leonard Myers: Pennsylvania representative to the US Congress, 1863–1875
- William Augustus Newell, class of 1839: New Jersey representative to the US Congress, 1847–1851, 1865–1867
- Robert N.C. Nix Sr.: Pennsylvania representative to the US Congress, 1958–79
- Edson Olds: Ohio representative to the US Congress, 1849–1855
- Archibald Olpp: New Jersey representative to the US Congress, 1921–1923
- Cyrus Maffet Palmer: Pennsylvania representative to the US Congress, 1927–1929
- John Patton: Virginia representative to the US Congress, 1830–1838
- Levi Pawling: Pennsylvania representative to the US Congress, 1817–1819
- John H. Pugh: New Jersey representative to the US Congress, 1877–1879
- Robert R. Reed: Pennsylvania representative to the US Congress, 1849–1851
- Jacob Richards: Pennsylvania representative to the US Congress, 1803–1809
- Lewis Riggs: New York representative to the US Congress, 1841–1843
- Caesar Augustus Rodney: Delaware representative to the US Congress, 1803–1805
- Albert Rutherford: Pennsylvania representative to the US Congress, 1937–1941
- Leon Sacks: Pennsylvania representative to the US Congress, 1937–1941
- Benjamin Say: Pennsylvania representative to the US Congress, 1808–1809
- Mary Gay Scanlon: Pennsylvania representative to the US Congress, 2018–
- Pius Schwert: Wharton School class of 1914, B.S. econ.: professional baseball catcher; New York representative in US Congress, 1939–1941
- David Scott: Georgia representative to the US Congress, 2003–
- Hardie Scott: Pennsylvania representative to the US Congress, 1947–1953
- John Roger Kirkpatrick Scott: Pennsylvania representative to the US Congress, 1915–1919
- Joshua Seney: Maryland representative to the US Congress, 1789–1792
- John Sergeant: Pennsylvania representative to the US Congress, 1815–1823, 1827–1829 and 1837–1841
- Adam Seybert: Pennsylvania representative to the US Congress, 1809–15 and 1817–19
- Henry Marchmore Shaw: North Carolina representative to the US Congress, 1853–1855 and 1857–1859
- William B. Shepard: North Carolina representative to the US Congress, 1829–1837
- John E. Sheridan: Pennsylvania representative to the US Congress, 1939–1947
- William Simonton: Pennsylvania representative to the US Congress, 1839–1843
- Edward J. Stack: Florida representative to the US Congress, 1979–1981
- James Strawbridge: Pennsylvania representative to the US Congress, 1873–1875
- Joel Barlow Sutherland: Pennsylvania representative to the US Congress, 1827–1837
- John Swope: Pennsylvania representative to the US Congress, 1884–1887
- William Terrell: Georgia representative to the US Congress, 1817–1821
- Martin Thayer: Pennsylvania representative to the US Congress, 1863–1865
- John Chew Thomas: Maryland representative to the US Congress, 1799–1801
- John Parnell Thomas: New Jersey representative to the US Congress, 1937–1950
- Hedge Thompson: New Jersey representative to the US Congress, 1827–1828
- Philip A. Traynor: Delaware representative to the US Congress, 1941–1943 and 1945–1947
- William Troutman: Pennsylvania representative to the US Congress, 1943–1945
- Charles Turpin: Pennsylvania representative to the US Congress, 1929–1937
- Jonathan Updegraff: Ohio representative to the US Congress, 1879–1882
- Joseph Vigorito: Pennsylvania representative to the US Congress, 1965–1977
- Percy Walker, MD (University of Pennsylvania School of Medicine class of 1835): Alabama representative to the US Congress, 1855–1857
- George Wallhauser: New Jersey representative to the US Congress, 1959–1965
- John H. Ware, III: Pennsylvania representative to the US Congress, 1970–1975
- John Goddard Watmough: Pennsylvania representative to the US Congress, 1831–1835
- Anthony Wayne: Georgia representative to the US Congress, 1791–1792
- James D. Weaver: Pennsylvania representative to the US Congress, 1963–1965
- William H. Wilson: Pennsylvania representative to the US Congress, 1935–1937
- Charles A. Wolverton: New Jersey representative to the US Congress, 1927–1959

==== United States ambassadors ====
As of July 2021, Penn alumni have served as United States ambassadors to at least 51 different countries.

- Robert Adams Jr. (1849–1906) (Penn College class of 1869, A.B. and Wharton class of 1884, B.F.): Envoy Extraordinary and Minister Plenipotentiary to Brazil 1889–1890 (also served as member of Pennsylvania State Senate for 6th district 1883–1885 and member of the US House of Representatives for Pennsylvania's 2nd congressional district 1893–1906)
- Paul H. Alling (Graduate School of Arts and Sciences, master's degree, class of 1924): first U.S. ambassador to Pakistan in September 1947, with his credentials being presented in February 1948
- Leonore Annenberg (1918–2009), Penn, Hon. LL.D., 1985 (Doctor of Laws) (Penn trustee, 1982–?): chief of Protocol of the United States (1981–1982)
- Walter Annenberg (1908–2002): Wharton School of the University of Pennsylvania (class of 1931 (did not graduate)) but was a member of Zeta Beta Tau fraternity and established the Annenberg School for Communication at the University of Pennsylvania: US ambassador to the United Kingdom 1969–1974
- Wilson T. M. Beale Jr. (1909–1998), Wharton class of 1933, MBA: 3rd ambassador extraordinary and plenipotentiary of United States to Jamaica September 1, 1965 – October 13, 1965
- Robert Mason Beecroft (College class of 1962, A.B., Graduate School class of 1965, A.M.; US chief of mission and Special Envoy to the Bosnian Federation 1997–1998
- Kenneth Braithwaite: U.S. ambassador to Norway under President Donald J. Trump; in 1995 earned a master's degree in government administration from Penn, Fels Institute of Government
- George Charles Bruno (Penn Law Fellow 1968): U.S. ambassador to Belize (1994–1997)
- Peter Burleigh: US ambassador to the United Nations, the Philippines, Palau, the Maldives, and Sri Lanka; attended graduate school but did not earn a degree
- Patricia A. Butenis (College class of 1974: US ambassador to Sri Lanka, the Maldives and Bangladesh
- David L. Cohen (Penn Law class of 1981): nominated on July 21, 2021, to be U.S. ambassador to Canada and on December 7, 2021, presented his credentials to governor general Mary Simon
- William R. Crawford Jr. (Graduate School class of 1950, A.M.): US ambassador to Yemen (1972–1974) and Cyprus (1974–1978)
- Oliver S. Crosby Penn's College class of 1946: US ambassador to Guinea (1977)
- John S. Durham (College class of 1885 with bachelor's degree, class of 1888 Graduate School, master's degree in Civil Engineering and University of Pennsylvania School of Law alumnus who did not graduate): journalist (editor of Daily Pennsylvanian), author, attorney, civil engineer, and diplomat who served as U.S. resident to Haiti and consul general September 3, 1891 – November 7, 1893, and concurrently as chargé d’affaires Dominican Republic September 3, 1891 – November 18, 1893
- Thomas K. Finletter (1893–1980; College class of 1915 and Penn Law class of 1920): US ambassador to NATO and Secretary of the Air Force
- Robert A. Flaten (1934– ) (Penn Graduate School), Ph.D.: U.S. ambassador to Rwanda (1990–1993) and as chair of the executive committee of the Nobel Peace Prize Forum
- Benjamin Franklin (1706–1790), Penn founder and trustee, 1749–1789: served as minister (ambassador) of the U.S. to France (1776–1785)
- Thomas S. Gates Jr. (Penn College class of 1928, A.B., and Hon. LL.D., 1956, trustee): 3rd ambassador and chief of the US Liaison Office in Beijing (1976–1979); 7th United States secretary of defense (December 2, 1959 – January 20, 1961); 8th deputy secretary of defense
- Lloyd Carpenter Griscom (1872–1959; Penn Law class of 1891, LLB, and Penn Law class of 1907, Doctor of Laws): US ambassador to Persia, Japan, Brazil, and Italy
- Amy Gutmann: 8th president of University of Pennsylvania and ambassador to Germany 2022–present
- John E. Hamm: US ambassador to Chile
- William Henry Harrison: third ambassador to Gran Colombia and ninth president of United States
- John S. Hayes: US ambassador to Switzerland and Liechtenstein
- Charles A. Heimbold Jr., Penn Law class of 1960: US ambassador to Sweden and former chairman and CEO of Bristol-Myers Squibb Company
- Jerome Heartwell "Brud" Holland (1916–1985) (Graduate School of Arts & Sciences class of 1950, Ph.D., and class of 1983, honorary LL.D.): US ambassador to Sweden, appointed in 1970 as first African-American ambassador of the U.S. to Sweden (1970–1972)
- Jon Huntsman Jr.: US ambassador to Russia, the People's Republic of China and Singapore
- Stuart E. Jones (Penn Law class of 1986): U.S. ambassador to Jordan and Iraq
- David Jordan: US ambassador to Peru
- Tina Kaidanow (College class of 1987): US ambassador to Kosovo
- Sung Kim (College class of 1982): US ambassador to Indonesia, US ambassador to the Philippines, ambassador to Republic of Korea and US special envoy to the Six-Party Talks
- Yuri Kim (born 1972) (College class of 1993, BA): US ambassador to Albania
- Michael David Kirby, College class of 1976, BA: US ambassador to Serbia and Moldova
- Robert E. Lamb (1936– ) (Penn College class of 1962, A.B.): served as ambassador of the United States to Cyprus (1990–1993)
- Ronald Lauder (1944– ) Wharton Undergrad class of 1965, B.S. in Econ.: ambassador of the United States to Austria (1986–1987)
- Franklin L. Lavin (Wharton Graduate School class of 1996, M.B.A.): ambassador of the United States to Singapore (2001– )
- Jeffrey Lunstead Graduate School of Arts & Sciences class of 1977, Ph.D.: ambassador of the United States to Sri Lanka and Maldives, 2003–present
- James Murray Mason (1798–1871): Penn's College class of 1819, A.B.; ambassador of the Confederate States of America to the United Kingdom and France, 1862–1865
- Marilyn McAfee (1940– ), Penn's College for Women class of 1961, A.B.: US ambassador to Guatemala (1993–1996)
- Gillian Milovanovic: U.S. ambassador to Mali and 4th U.S. ambassador to North Macedonia
- Edward Joy Morris (1815–1881) attended College (1831–1832, but did not earn degree): served as chargé d'affaires (aka US ambassador) to Sicily (1850–1853) and minister resident (ambassador) of the US to the Ottoman Empire (1861–1870)
- Gouverneur Morris (1752–1816, attended Penn's Academy of Philadelphia, 1761, but did not earn a degree): Minister of the United States to France (1792–1794)
- John H. Morrow (1910–2000), Penn Graduate School of Arts & Sciences class of 1952, Ph.D.: US ambassador to Guinea, 1959–1961
- Phil Murphy (Wharton MBA class of 1983): US ambassador to Germany
- Wanda L. Nesbitt Penn College class of 1978, A.B.: ambassador of the United States to Madagascar, Ivory Coast, and Namibia
- Condy Raguet: 1st US ambassador to Brazil
- Gautam A. Rana: US ambassador to Slovakia
- William Bradford Reed: US minister to China
- Caesar Augustus Rodney (1772–1824): Penn College class of 1789, A.B., 1789; plenipotentiary (ambassador) of the US to Argentina, 1823–1824
- Thomas J. Scotes: US ambassador to Yemen
- Charles S. Shapiro: US ambassador to Venezuela
- Thomas P. Shoesmith: US ambassador to Malaysia
- Martin J. Silverstein: US ambassador to Uruguay
- Susan N. Stevenson: US ambassador to Equatorial Guinea, nominated by President Trump on September 13, 2018, and was confirmed as ambassador on January 2, 2019
- Robert Strausz-Hupé: US ambassador to Sri Lanka, Belgium, Sweden, NATO, and Turkey; founder of the Foreign Policy Research Institute; prolific scholar of international relations and geopolitics
- Henry J. Tasca: US ambassador to Greece and Morocco
- Nicholas F. Taubman: US ambassador to Romania
- Marilyn Ware: US ambassador to Finland
- Faith Ryan Whittlesey: US ambassador to Switzerland

==== Other federal government officials ====
- Hannah August: press secretary for First Lady of the United States Michelle Obama

=== State government ===
==== Governors ====
As of May 2020, 48 Penn alumni or trustees have served as governors of 24 different states, Puerto Rico and American Samoa as detailed below:

- Amos W. Barber: 2nd governor of Wyoming, 1890–93
- Gunning Bedford Sr.: governor of Delaware, 1796–97
- John C. Bell Jr. (1892–1974; class of 1917): 18th lieutenant governor of Pennsylvania (1943–1947) before becoming the 33rd and shortest-serving governor of Pennsylvania, serving for 19 days in 1947
- William Wyatt Bibb: first governor of the state of Alabama, 1819–1820; served as governor of the Alabama Territory, 1817–1819
- Martin G. Brumbaugh (Ph.D. earned in 1894): governor of Pennsylvania, 1911–1915; first professor of pedagogy in Penn's Department of Philosophy
- C. Douglass Buck: governor of Delaware, 1929–37
- William Burton: governor of Delaware, 1859–1863
- Joseph M. Carey, class of 1864, governor of Wyoming, 1911–1915
- Thomas King Carroll: governor of Maryland, 1829–1831
- Joshua Clayton: governor of Delaware 1793–1798, attended Academy of Philadelphia but did not graduate
- Philemon Dickerson: governor of New Jersey, 1836–1837
- James Henderson Duff: governor of Pennsylvania (1947–1951); studied law at Penn Law before graduating from University of Pittsburgh
- James B. Edwards, post-graduate student at Penn: governor of South Carolina, 1975–79
- John Floyd, class of 1804 of Penn Med: 25th governor of Virginia, 1830–1834 Virginia representative to the US Congress
- George F. Fort: governor of New Jersey, 1851–1854
- William Gilpin, class of 1833: first governor of the Territory of Colorado, 1861–1862
- Charles Goldsborough: governor of Maryland, 1819
- James Hamilton (trustee 1755–1783; president of board 1764, 1771–1773): governor of province of Pennsylvania and Pennsylvania Provincial Council (May 4 – October 16, 1771)
- William Henry Harrison: first governor of Indiana Territory, 1800–12
- John Hubbard: governor of Maine, 1850–1853
- Jon Huntsman Jr.: governor of Utah, 2005–2009
- George Izard, class of 1792: second governor of Arkansas Territory, 1825–1828
- Lawrence M. Judd: governor of Hawaii (1929–1934), and American Samoa (1954)
- William Carr Lane (Penn Med attended 1815–1816 academic year): 2nd governor of Territory of New Mexico, 1852–1853, and first mayor of St. Louis, Missouri, 1823–1829
- George M. Leader (Penn College class of 1940, BA, and Penn Fels Institute of Government class of 1941, MGA): 36th governor of Pennsylvania, 1955–1959
- Lloyd Lowndes Jr.: governor of Maryland, 1895–1899
- George B. McClellan: general-in-chief of the Union Army during the US Civil War; unsuccessful Democratic candidate for president 1864; later governor of New Jersey; attended law school for two years at the age of 12 before transferring to the US Military Academy, from which he graduated at the age of 16
- John G. McCullough, attorney general of California during the Civil War; governor of Vermont, 1902–1904
- Alexander McNair: first governor of Missouri
- Thomas Mifflin, class of 1760: first governor of Pennsylvania, 1790–1799; signatory to the US Constitution; brigadier general in the Continental Army during the American Revolution
- Charles R. Miller, 54th governor of Delaware, 1913–1917
- Wayne Mixson: governor of Florida, 1987
- Phil Murphy (Wharton MBA class of 1983): 56th governor of New Jersey
- William Augustus Newell: 18th governor of New Jersey, 1857–1860; governor of the Washington Territory, 1880–1884
- John M. Patton: acting governor of Virginia, 1841; great-grandfather of World War II General George S. Patton Jr.
- Samuel W. Pennypacker: governor of Pennsylvania, 1903–1907
- Jesús T. Piñero: governor of Puerto Rico, 1946–49
- Ed Rendell: governor of Pennsylvania, former mayor of Philadelphia and former Democratic National Committee chairman
- Gove Saulsbury: governor of Delaware, 1865–1871
- Hulett C. Smith: governor of West Virginia
- Rexford Tugwell: governor of Puerto Rico
- Robert John Walker (1801–1869; class of 1819) served briefly as governor of Kansas in 1857 (when he resigned due to his opposition to the administration-sponsored pro-slavery Kansas Lecompton Constitution) and also served as a member of the US Senate from Mississippi 1835–1845 (where he was responsible for drafting the 1849 bill that eventually established the United States Department of the Interior), and as secretary of the treasury 1845–1849
- Matthew E. Welsh Wharton Undergrad class of 1934 (BS in economics): 41st governor of Indiana
- James Wilkinson Penn Med class of 1779 (did not graduate): first governor of the Louisiana Territory

==== State legislators ====
At least 60 Penn alumni and/or trustees have served in state legislatures in at least 19 states (at least five of whom have served as speaker of their respective houses of representatives [in Maine, New Jersey, Oregon, and Pennsylvania] and one of whom served as President of New Jersey Senate) as detailed below:

- Robert Adams Jr. (1849–1906; class of 1869, member of St. Anthony Hall fraternity): Republican member of the Pennsylvania State Senate for the 6th district 1883–1885 (also served as a member of the US House of Representatives for Pennsylvania's 2nd congressional district 1893–1906 and served as the envoy extraordinary and minister plenipotentiary to Brazil April 1, 1889 – June 1, 1890)
- Charles Carmine Antonio Baldi Jr. (1890–1962), class of 1912 (did not graduate): elected and served nine terms as a Republican in the Pennsylvania House of Representatives (1917–1935)
- Joseph F.M. Baldi (1893–1970), Wharton class of 1916 (B.S. in economics), Penn Law class of 1919 (did not graduate): elected and served two terms as a Republican in the Pennsylvania House of Representatives (1929–1933)
- Harry W. Bass (Penn Law class of 1896): first African American member of the Pennsylvania House of Representatives, 1911–1914
- Jennifer Beck (Fels Institute of Government, MGA): Republican politician, served in the New Jersey State Senate representing the 11th Legislative District 2012–2018 and prior to redistricting, served in the Senate 2008–2012 representing the 12th Legislative District, serving portions of Monmouth and Mercer counties, and represented the 12th District in the New Jersey General Assembly 2006–2008
- Arthur L. Bell MBA 1976: Maine state representative
- William Bingham (1752–1804): first speaker of the Pennsylvania House of Representatives
- Louis A. Bloom: Republican member of the Pennsylvania House of Representatives for Delaware County (1947–1952) and Judge Pennsylvania Court of Common Pleas for Delaware County
- Karen Boback: Republican member of the Pennsylvania House of Representatives (2007–2022)
- Stacy Brenner: Democratic member of the Maine State Senate (2020– )
- John F. Byrne Jr.: Pennsylvania state senator for the 6th district (1967–1970)
- Martha Hughes Cannon, BS, MD, Penn Med post-doc education class of 1882; Penn College class of 1882: Utah state senator; first female state senator elected in the US
- John B. Chase: member of Wisconsin State Senate
- Robert J. Clendening: Republican member of the Pennsylvania House of Representatives (1949–1952)
- Herbert B. Cohen (1900–1970; Wharton class of 1922 and University of Pennsylvania Law School class of 1925): served as Democratic member of the Pennsylvania House of Representatives for four consecutive terms, 1933–1940, twice as majority leader, once as minority leader; attorney general of Pennsylvania 1955–1956; justice of Pennsylvania Supreme Court 1957–1970
- Mark B. Cohen: Democratic member of the Pennsylvania House of Representatives
- Eckley Brinton Coxe: Pennsylvania state senator for the 21st district 1881–1884
- Jean B. Cryor: former Maryland delegate
- Glenn Cummings: Democratic member of the Maine House of Representatives, including one term as speaker of the House (2000–2008)
- John Warren Davis: former member of the New Jersey State Senate; United States attorney for the District of New Jersey; judge for the United States District Court for the District of New Jersey and United States Court of Appeals for the Third Circuit
- Dan Debicella: member of the Connecticut Senate
- William K. Dickey: speaker of the New Jersey General Assembly and chairman of the Delaware River Port Authority
- Marie Donigan (Penn School of Design, MS in Landscape Architecture): Democratic member of the Michigan State House of Representatives (2004–2011)
- Frank Farry, III (1975– ) (Wharton class of 1995, BS in economics): Pennsylvania State Senate, 6th Senate District (2023– ), previously served in the Pennsylvania House of Representatives representing the 142nd legislative district (2009–2022)
- Ed Flanagan: member of the Vermont Senate (2005–2011); first openly gay person ever elected to statewide office in the United States when he was elected Vermont state auditor (1993–2001) in 1995 when he was re-elected
- David Frockt (born 1969) Penn, B.A. in Political Science (class of 1991): first elected to the Washington State House of Representatives in 2010 and in 2011, after the death of Senator Scott White, the Metropolitan King County Council voted unanimously to appointed for the 46th legislative district of Washington State Senate, which includes North Seattle, Lake Forest Park, and Kenmore Washington State Senate and in 2012 was retained by voters to serve the remaining two years of the open Senate term and in 2014 was re-elected to a full term in the State Senate, where he is a member on the Ways & Means, Law & Justice, and Human Services committees
- Michael F. Gerber: Democratic member of the Pennsylvania House of Representatives
- Michael U. Gisriel: former member of the Maryland House of Delegates
- Robert M. Gordon Wharton MBA Class of 1978: Democratic member of the New Jersey Assembly (2004–2008) and New Jersey Senate (2008– 2018) also served as mayor of Fair Lawn, New Jersey
- Stewart Greenleaf: Republican member of the Pennsylvania State Senate (1978– )
- Bernard M. Gross (1935–2024) (Wharton School of Finance class of 1956, Penn Law class of 1959) elected twice as Democratic member of the Pennsylvania House of Representatives from the 200th district for years 1967–1970
- John J. Hafer: former Maryland state senator
- James Hamilton (trustee 1755–1783; president of board 1764, 1771–1773): member of Assembly of Province of Pennsylvania (1735–1740) and member of Pennsylvania Provincial Council (1746–1747)
- Phil Hart (Wharton MBA, class of 1984): Republican senator in Idaho Senate (2022– ) who previously served in the Idaho House of Representatives for Legislative District 3B 2004–2012
- Charlie Brady Hauser: member of the North Carolina General Assembly
- Jon Hinck: member of the Maine House of Representatives (2006– )
- Scott Hutchinson: Wharton Undergrad class of 1983: Republican member of Pennsylvania State Senate 21st District and member of Pennsylvania House of Representatives 64th District
- Constance N. Johnson: Democratic member of the Oklahoma State Senate (2005–2014); United States Senate Democratic nominee of Oklahoma (2014)
- Eric Johnson: Democratic member of the Texas House of Representatives (2010– )
- Movita Johnson-Harrell: Democratic member of the Pennsylvania House of Representatives (2019– )
- Tony Jordan: member of the New York State Assembly (2009– )
- Steve Katz: member of the New York State Assembly and Candidate for New York State Senate
- John Manners: president of the New Jersey Senate (1852)
- John Hartwell Marable: University of Pennsylvania School of Medicine (class of 1814) but with no record of graduation; member of the Tennessee Senate (1817–1818)
- Bruce Marks: Republican member of the Pennsylvania 2nd senatorial district 1994–1995
- Albert Dutton MacDade: Pennsylvania state senator, 1921–1929, judge, Pennsylvania Court of Common Pleas (Delaware County), 1942–1948
- Dave Min: Penn College and Wharton Undergrad class of 1999 (BA and BSE) elected state senator for California's 37th Senate district (which includes portions of Orange County) and ia now California representative elect to the US Congress, 2025-
- Charles B. Moores: University of Pennsylvania Law School (class of 1874) speaker of the Oregon House of Representatives (1895–96)
- Raj Mukherji: Assemblyman of the New Jersey State Legislature
- James Newsom (W'95): Democratic member of the New Hampshire House of Representatives, 2025–present
- Jennifer O'Mara (Penn Graduate School of Arts & Sciences, class of 2017): represents the 165th Legislative District
- Joseph J. Roberts: former speaker and assemblyman of the New Jersey State Legislature
- Ronald B. Russell (Penn College class of 1982): Democratic member of the Maine House of Representatives (2022– )
- Richard Peters Jr., class of 1761: Pennsylvania delegate to the Continental Congress, 1782–1783; Commissioner for the Board of War for the Continental Army; speaker of the Pennsylvania House of Representatives; served in the Pennsylvania Senate; appointed as judge of the US District Court for the Eastern District of Pennsylvania (1815–1828)
- James N. Robertson: Republican member of the Pennsylvania House of Representative (1949–1952)
- Vaughn Stewart: Democratic member of the Maryland House of Delegates (2019– )
- David W. Sweet: Democratic member of the Pennsylvania House of Representatives (1978–1988)
- Chris Taylor: Democratic member of the Wisconsin State Assembly (2011– )
- Eric Turkington: Democratic member of the Massachusetts House of Representatives
- Charles R. Weiner: Democratic Leader of the Pennsylvania Senate
- "Buck" Charles Wharton (1868–1949), Wharton School of Finance class of 1897: selected as an All-American guard in 1896; played on Penn teams that were undefeated and won back-to-back national championships in 1894 and 1895; Delaware state senator 1914–1917; in 1963, posthumously inducted into the College Football Hall of Fame
- Constance H. Williams: Democratic member of the Pennsylvania State Senate
- Robert C. Wonderling: Republican member of the Pennsylvania State Senate
- Bob Ziegelbauer: Democratic member of the Wisconsin State Assembly

==== Mayors ====
At least 50 Penn alumni or trustees have served as mayors of cities in at least 23 states, and the Commonwealth of Puerto Rico (including following large cities: Atlanta, Dallas, Las Vegas, Nashville, New Orleans, Philadelphia (10), Phoenix, Pittsburgh, Saint Louis, Saint Paul, Salt Lake City, San Antonio (2), San Francisco (2))

- Edward Bader: 29th mayor of Atlantic City, New Jersey, 1920–1929
- Joseph F. Battle Jr.: mayor of Chester, Pennsylvania, 1979–1986
- Ralph Becker Jr.: 34th mayor of Salt Lake City, 2008–2015
- John S. Brenner (Fels Institute of Government MGA): 23rd mayor of York, Pennsylvania, 2002–2010
- Peter Brownell: 39th mayor of Burlington, Vermont, 1993–1995
- Joseph M. Carey: 14th mayor of Cheyenne, Wyoming, 1881–1885
- John B. Chase: mayor of Oconto, Wisconsin
- Joseph S. Clark: 90th mayor of Philadelphia, 1952–1956
- Donald S. Coburn: mayor of Livingston, New Jersey, 1977–1978
- Janet Cowell: College, Wharton School and Lauder Institute graduate (B.A., M.A., M.B.A.): 63rd mayor of Raleigh, North Carolina (2024– ), previously North Carolina state treasurer (2009–2017), two-term member of the Raleigh City Council, and two-term Democratic member of the North Carolina Senate, representing Wake County
- Elisha C. Dick (University of Pennsylvania School of Medicine class of 1782): mayor of Alexandria, Virginia, 1804–05
- Stephen Dilts: mayor of Hampton, New Jersey
- Walter Drumheller: Penn Dental School Class of 1902: first mayor of Sunbury, Pennsylvania
- Mark Farrell (Penn Law class of 2001): 44th mayor of San Francisco (January–July 2018)
- Shirley Franklin: M.A. in sociology: mayor of Atlanta, 2002–10
- Katherine Sarah Kate Gallego née Widland (born 1981): Master of Business Administration from the Wharton School of the University of Pennsylvania, 62nd mayor of Phoenix 2019–
- Wilson Goode: first African-American and 95th mayor of Philadelphia, 1984–1992
- Oscar Goodman: 21st mayor of Las Vegas, Nevada, 1999–2011
- Robert M. Gordon: mayor of Fair Lawn, New Jersey, 1988–1991
- Henry Winfield Haldeman: mayor of Girard, Kansas, 1895–1899
- James Hamilton (trustee 1755–1783; president of board 1764, 1771–1773) 28th mayor of Philadelphia
- John E. Hamm: mayor of Zanesville, Ohio, 1815
- Paul Heroux: Master's in criminology, elected state representative in Massachusetts and in 2018 as mayor of Attleboro, Massachusetts
- George Hewston: 16th mayor of San Francisco, 1875
- Eric Johnson (Penn Law JD class of 2003): 60th mayor of Dallas, Texas, 2019–present
- Judith Flanagan Kennedy (Penn Law, JD class of 1987): 56th mayor of Lynn, Massachusetts (2010–2018) through a write-in campaign; Lynn's first female mayor
- Michael Keppele (College class of 1788): 54th mayor of Philadelphia, 1811–12
- William Kerr: mayor of Pittsburgh, 1845–1847
- William Carr Lane (Penn Med, attended 1815–1816 academic year): first mayor of St. Louis, Missouri, 1823–1829
- Harry Arista Mackey: 85th mayor of Philadelphia, 1928–1931
- Hannah McKinney: mayor of Kalamazoo, Michigan, 2005–2007
- Morton McMichael: 70th mayor of Philadelphia, 1866–1869
- Marc Morial: mayor of New Orleans, 1994–2002; president of the United States Conference of Mayors, 2001–2002; president and CEO of the National Urban League, 2003–
- Magnus Miller Murray: mayor of Pittsburgh
- Ron Nirenberg: mayor of San Antonio, Texas, 2017–
- Michael Nutter (Wharton class of 1979, BS in economics): 98th mayor of Philadelphia, 2007–2016
- Cherelle Parker (Fels Institute of Government class of 2016, MGA) 100th mayor of Philadelphia 2024–present
- Thomas R. Potts: first mayor of St. Paul, Minnesota, 1850–1851
- Samuel Powel, class of 1759: 45th mayor of Philadelphia and speaker of the Pennsylvania Senate
- Ed Rendell: 96th mayor of Philadelphia, 1992–1999
- Felix Robertson: mayor of Nashville, Tennessee, 1818–1819, 1827–1829
- Alan Schlesinger: mayor of Derby, Connecticut, 1994–1997
- Edward J. Stack: mayor of Pompano Beach, Florida, 1965–1969
- Nao Takasugi: mayor of Oxnard, California, 1982–1992
- Ivy Taylor: mayor of San Antonio, Texas, 2014–2017; first female African-American mayor of a city with a population of more than one million
- J. Parnell Thomas: mayor of Allendale, New Jersey, 1926–1930
- Victor Yarnell: mayor of Reading, Pennsylvania, 1968–1972
- Francisco Zayas Seijo: mayor of Ponce, Puerto Rico, 2004–2008

==== State supreme court justices ====
As of July 23, 2023, 31 Penn alumni have served as justices of supreme courts of 11 states and the District of Columbia, and 12 have served as chief justices of a state supreme court, as detailed below:

- William Allen, a founder of Pennsylvania Hospital and trustee of Penn, funded the state house (Independence Hall), mayor of Philadelphia, appointed judge of the Orphans' and Common Pleas courts of Philadelphia, chief justice of Supreme Court of Pennsylvania (1750–1767)
- Rachel Wainer Apter, College class of 2002: New Jersey Supreme Court associate justice
- John C. Bell Jr. (1892–1974), class of 1917: justice of Pennsylvania Supreme Court (1950–1972), chief justice of Pennsylvania Supreme Court (1961–1972)
- Alexander F. Barbieri (1907–1993), Penn College class of 1929, Penn Law class of 1932: justice of Pennsylvania Supreme Court; judge of Commonwealth Court of Pennsylvania; one of the original members of the Commonwealth Court in 1970 (appointed to the Pennsylvania Supreme Court in 1971, but was defeated for election in 1971 and returned to the Commonwealth Court as a senior judge (1983–1993))
- William J. Brennan, Wharton Undergrad class of 1928: justice of New Jersey Supreme Court (1951–1956) (later justice of United States Supreme Court)
- William Bradford: justice of Pennsylvania Supreme Court (1791–1794), and attorney general of Pennsylvania (1780–91); attended Penn for three years before graduating from Princeton University
- Elissa F. Cadish (born August 8, 1964) (College class of 1986): justice, Nevada Supreme Court (2019– ) former chief justice (2024-2025)
- Joseph M. Carey: Penn's Law Department class of 1867 attorney general of Wyoming (1869–1871); justice, Wyoming Supreme Court (1871–1876)
- Herbert B. Cohen (1900–1970), Wharton (class of 1922) and University of Pennsylvania Law School (class of 1925): served as Representative of Pennsylvania State House of Representatives for four consecutive terms, 1933–1940, twice as majority leader, once as minority leader; attorney general of Pennsylvania 1955–1956; and justice of Pennsylvania Supreme Court 1957–1970
- James Harry Covington, chief justice of Supreme Court of the District of Columbia (1914–1918); and co-founder of Covington & Burling
- Lucius Elmer: former justice of New Jersey Supreme Court and attorney general of New Jersey
- Arthur J. England Jr. (Wharton Undergraduate class of 1955 and Penn Law class of 1961): served on the Florida Supreme Court (1975–1981); chief justice of Florida Supreme Court (1978–1980)
- Richard L. Gabriel, Penn Law class of 1987 (born 1962): appointed in 2015 (continues to serve after being retained in 2018) as associate justice of Colorado Supreme Court; previously served on Colorado Court of Appeals 2008–2015
- Randy J. Holland, justice of Delaware Supreme Court (1986–2017)
- Edwin Ames Jaggard, Penn Law class of 1882: judge on Minnesota District Court (Ramsey County, Minnesota) (1898–1905); justice on Minnesota Supreme Court (1905–1911)
- Benjamin Rowland Jones Jr. (1906–1980) Penn Law class of 1930: justice of Supreme Court of Pennsylvania 1957–1972 and chief justice 1972–1977
- William H. Lamb (born 1940), Penn Law class of 1965): former justice of Pennsylvania Supreme Court (2003–2004)
- Daniel J. Layton: chief justice of Delaware Supreme Court (1933–1945), and attorney general of Delaware (1932–33)
- Robert N. C. Nix Jr.: former chief justice of Pennsylvania Supreme Court (1984–1996), he was the first African-American chief justice of any state's highest court; justice of Pennsylvania Supreme Court (1971–1984)
- Joseph B. Perskie (1885–1957; class of 1907), associate justice of New Jersey Supreme Court 1933–1947
- Deborah T. Poritz, chief justice of New Jersey Supreme Court (1996–2006) (previously attorney general of New Jersey 1994–1996, in both cases the first woman to serve in that position
- Albert Rosenblatt: judge on New York Court of Appeals, the highest court in New York state (1998–2006)
- George Sharswood: former chief justice of Pennsylvania Supreme Court, and dean of Penn School of Law
- Thomas Smith (University of Pennsylvania Medical School (class of 1829): justice of Indiana Supreme Court (January 29, 1847, – January 3, 1853)
- Horace Stern (Penn Law class of 1890): chief justice of Pennsylvania Supreme Court (1952–56) and Justice of Pennsylvania Supreme Court (1932–1952)
- Leo E. Strine Jr. (Penn Law class of 1988): Chief Justice of Delaware Supreme Court (2014–2019) and judge and vice-chancellor of the Delaware Court of Chancery
- Richard B. Teitelman: chief justice of the Missouri Supreme Court (2011–2013)
- William Tilghman: chief justice of Pennsylvania Supreme Court (1805–1827); attended Penn but did not earn a degree
- Jasper Yeates (College class of 1758): delegate to the Pennsylvania convention that ratified the United States Constitution in 1787, appointed as justice of Pennsylvania Supreme Court in 1791, served until his death in 1817
- Karen L. Valihura (Penn Law class of 1986), justice of the Delaware Supreme Court (appointed June 6, 2014)

=== US federal judges ===
As of February 2024 there are at least 84 Penn alumni and/or faculty who have been appointed judges in United States federal court system (3 of whom have served on the Supreme Court, at least 23 of whom have served on Courts of Appeals, and at least 50 of whom have served on District Courts)

==== United States Supreme Court justices ====
- William J. Brennan: US Supreme Court justice; recipient of the Presidential Medal of Freedom
- Owen J. Roberts, Justice, Supreme Court of the United States
- James Wilson, Penn's first Professor of Law: appointed by George Washington as one of first Supreme Court Justices who taught Washington and his cabinet (as a Penn Professor) a course on the United States Constitution, which Wilson helped draft

==== United States courts of appeals judges ====
At least 23 judges who served in nine different circuit courts of appeal are alumni of Penn.

- Arlin Adams (1921–2015), judge, Penn Law class of 1947 United States Court of Appeals for the Third Circuit 1969–1987
- Edward R. Becker (1933–2006), Penn College class of 1954: former chief judge of the United States Court of Appeals for the Third Circuit
- Andre M. Davis (born 1949), Penn College class of 1971: judge for the United States Court of Appeals for the Fourth Circuit (2009–14)
- Ronald M. Gould (born 1946): Penn class of 1968 judge for the United States Court of Appeals for the Ninth Circuit
- James Hunter III (1916–1989), Penn Law class of 1939: judge, US Court of Appeals for the Third Circuit, 1971–1989
- Harry Ellis Kalodner (1896–1977), Penn Law class of 1917: chief judge, US Court of Appeals for the Third Circuit, 1946–1977
- Phyllis A. Kravitch: judge on the United States Court of Appeals for the Eleventh Circuit
- Robert Lowe Kunzig (1918–1982), Penn College class of 1939, Penn Law class of 1942, judge, US Court of Claims, 1971–1982
- Alan David Lourie (born 1935), Penn Graduate School of Arts and Sciences class of 1965, Ph.D. in Chemistry: judge on the United States Court of Appeals for the Federal Circuit
- John Bayard McPherson (1846–1919), Penn Law Professor (1890–?): judge, US Court of Appeals for the Third Circuit, 1912–1919
- Florence Y. Pan (1965– ), class of 1988, college, BA, and Wharton, BS, Economics: Judge of the United States Court of Appeals for the District of Columbia Circuit
- Arthur Raymond Randolph, judge, United States Court of Appeals for the District of Columbia Circuit
- Marjorie Rendell: judge for the United States District Court for the Eastern District of Pennsylvania (1994–97), and for the United States Court of Appeals for the Third Circuit (1997– )
- L. Felipe Restrepo (Penn College class of 1981): United States Circuit Judge of the United States Court of Appeals for the Third Circuit (2015 to present) and former United States District Judge of the United States District Court for the Eastern District of Pennsylvania (2006–2014)
- Paul Hitch Roney: chief judge for the United States Court of Appeals for the Eleventh Circuit (1986–1989)
- Max Rosenn, judge, US Court of Appeals for the Third Circuit, 1970–2006
- Patty Shwartz, Penn Law class of 1986: judge, United States Court of Appeals for the Third Circuit
- Dolores Sloviter, judge, United States Court of Appeals for the Third Circuit
- Joseph Whitaker Thompson, judge, United States Court of Appeals for the Third Circuit (1931–1946)
- Henry Galbraith Ward, Penn College (BA and MA class of 1870), judge, US United States Court of Appeals for the Second Circuit (1907–1924)
- Helene White, judge, US Court of Appeals for the Sixth Circuit
- Scott Wilson: judge, United States Court of Appeals for the First Circuit (1929–1943)

==== Other United States court judges (district courts, and other federal courts) ====
- Guy K. Bard (1895–1953), Penn Law class of 1922: judge, United States District Court for the Eastern District of Pennsylvania
- Harvey Bartle III (born 1941), Penn Law class of 1965: judge, United States District Court for the Eastern District of Pennsylvania
- Michael Baylson: judge, United States District Court for the Eastern District of Pennsylvania
- Ralph C. Body: judge, United States District Court for the Eastern District of Pennsylvania, 1965–1973
- Raymond J. Broderick: judge, United States District Court for the Eastern District of Pennsylvania
- Margo Kitsy Brodie (née Williams born 1966; Penn Law class of 1991): chief judge, United States District Court for the Eastern District of New York
- Allison D. Burroughs (born 1961), Penn Law class of 1988: United States district judge of the United States District Court for the District of Massachusetts received her federal judicial commission on December 19, 2014, and sworn in on January 7, 2015; began her legal career as a law clerk for fellow Penn Law alumna Judge Norma L. Shapiro of the United States District Court for the Eastern District of Pennsylvania 1988–1989; also assistant U.S. attorney in the Eastern District of Pennsylvania 1989–1995 and served in the District of Massachusetts 1995–2005
- James C. Cacheris: judge on the United States District Court for the Eastern District of Virginia
- A. Richard Caputo: judge, United States District Court for the Eastern District of Pennsylvania
- Tanya Chutkan, Penn Law class of 1987: judge, United States District Court for the District of Columbia; judge overseeing the criminal trial of former US president Donald Trump related to the events leading up to the January 6, 2021 United States Capitol attack
- Rudolph Contreras: judge, United States District Court for the District of Columbia.
- James Harry Covington: judge, United States District Court for the District of Columbia; co-founder of Covington & Burling
- James C. Cacheris: judge on the United States District Court for the Eastern District of Virginia
- Stewart Dalzell (1943–2019): graduated from the University of Pennsylvania, Wharton School of Business with a Bachelor of Science degree in 1965 and received his Juris Doctor from the University of Pennsylvania Law School in 1969, United States district judge of the United States District Court for the Eastern District of Pennsylvania
- John Morgan Davis: United States district judge of the United States District Court for the Eastern District of Pennsylvania 1964–1984
- John Warren Davis: former United States district judge of the United States District Court for the District of New Jersey and the United States Court of Appeals for the Third Circuit
- Paul S. Diamond: United States district judge of the United States District Court for the Eastern District of Pennsylvania
- John William Ditter Jr.: United States district judge of the United States District Court for the Eastern District of Pennsylvania
- Susan J. Dlott: judge for the United States District Court for the Southern District of Ohio (1995– )
- Herbert Allan Fogel: United States district judge of the United States District Court for the Eastern District of Pennsylvania, 1973–1978
- James S. Halpern: judge, United States Tax Court (1990–2005)
- Michael Harvey, Penn Law class of 1993, Magistrate Judge for District of Columbia
- Francis Hopkinson, class of 1757: Founding Father and signatory to the Declaration of Independence; judge of the Admiralty Court of Pennsylvania in 1779 and reappointed in 1780 and 1787; judge in the US District Court for the Eastern District of Pennsylvania, 1789–1791; considered to have played a key role in the design of the first American flag, and is credited with writing the first secular American song
- Daniel Henry Huyett III: United States district judge of the United States District Court for the Eastern District of Pennsylvania, 1970–1998
- William Huntington Kirkpatrick: United States district judge of the United States District Court for the Eastern District of Pennsylvania 1927–1958
- Abdul Kallon: United States district judge of the United States District Court for the District of Alabama
- John C. Knox: judge, United States district judge of the United States District Court for the Southern District of New York, 1948–55
- Charles William Kraft Jr.: United States district judge of the United States District Court for the Eastern District of Pennsylvania, 1956–2002
- Caleb Rodney Layton III: United States district judge of the United States District Court for the District of Delaware, 1957–1988
- Paul Conway Leahy: judge for the United States District Court for the District of Delaware (1942–66 -judge)(1948–57 -chief judge)
- James Russell Leech: judge, United States Tax Court (1932–1952)
- Joseph Simon Lord III: United States district judge of the United States District Court for the Eastern District of Pennsylvania, 1961–1992; Chief Judge of the United States District Court for the Eastern District of Pennsylvania (1971–82)
- Alfred Leopold Luongo: United States district judge of the United States District Court for the Eastern District of Pennsylvania (1961–1986); Chief Judge of the United States District Court for the Eastern District of Pennsylvania (1982–86)
- Thomas Ambrose Masterson: judge, United States district judge of the United States District Court for the Eastern District of Pennsylvania, 1967–1973
- James Focht McClure Jr.: United States district judge of the United States District Court for the Middle District of Pennsylvania
- Barron Patterson McCune: United States district judge of the United States District Court for the Western District of Pennsylvania
- Joseph Leo McGlynn Jr.: United States district judge of the United States District Court for the Eastern District of Pennsylvania, 1974–1999
- Gerald Austin McHugh Jr.: United States district judge of the United States District Court for the Eastern District of Pennsylvania, 2014–
- Charles Louis McKeehan: United States district judge of the United States District Court for the Eastern District of Pennsylvania, 1923–1925
- Roderick R. McKelvie: United States district judge of the United States District Court for the District of Delaware, 1991–2002
- Mary A. McLaughlin: United States district judge of the United States District Court for the Eastern District of Pennsylvania
- Howard G. Munson: chief judge for the United States District Court for the Northern District of New York (1980–88)
- John W. Murphy: Judge of the United States District Court for the Middle District of Pennsylvania (1946–1962); Chief Judge (for portion of 1945–1962)
- Thomas Newman O'Neill Jr.: United States district judge of the United States District Court for the Eastern District of Pennsylvania
- Richard Peters Jr., class of 1761: Pennsylvania delegate to the Continental Congress, 1782–83; Commissioner for the Board of War for the Continental Army; Speaker of the Pennsylvania House of Representatives; served in the Pennsylvania Senate; appointed by George Washington as judge of the US District Court for the Eastern District of Pennsylvania (1815–1828)
- Gene E. K. Pratter: United States district judge of the United States District Court for the Eastern District of Pennsylvania
- Bruce E. Reinhart (Penn Law class of 1987): United States magistrate judge for the Southern District of Florida sworn in on March 14, 2018, law clerk for fellow Penn Law graduate Judge Norma L. Shapiro of the United States District Court for the Eastern District of Pennsylvania 1987–1988; also served as an Assistant United States Attorney; known for approving search of former president's private residence
- Sue Lewis Robinson: United States district judge of the United States District Court for the District of Delaware
- Juan Ramon Sánchez: United States district judge of the United States District Court for the Eastern District of Pennsylvania
- Ralph Francis Scalera: United States district judge of the United States District Court for the Western District of Pennsylvania
- Allen G. Schwartz: United States district judge of the United States District Court for the Southern District of New York, 1993–2003
- Murray Merle Schwartz: chief United States district judge of the United States District Court for the District of Delaware, 1974–
- Norma Levy Shapiro: United States district judge of the United States District Court for the Eastern District of Pennsylvania
- Jerome B. Simandle: United States district judge of the United States District Court for the District of New Jersey
- Jonathan R. Steinberg (1940–2015), Penn Law Class of 1963: appointed by President George H.W. Bush in 1990 as federal judge for the United States Court of Appeals for Veterans Claims, retired in 2005 but stayed on as a senior judge until his death in 2015
- Charles Swayne, judge, United States district judge of the United States District Court for the Northern District of Florida, 1890–1907
- Donald West VanArtsdalen: United States district judge of the United States District Court for the Eastern District of Pennsylvania 1970–1985
- Jay Waldman: United States district judge of the United States District Court for the Eastern District of Pennsylvania 1988–2003
- Gerald Joseph Weber (Penn Law class of 1939): senior judge, chief judge, and judge, United States District Court for the Western District of Pennsylvania (1964–1988) (Chief Judge 1976–1982)
- Victor John Wolski: judge, United States Court of Federal Claims
- Harold Kenneth Wood: United States district judge of the United States District Court for the Eastern District of Pennsylvania 1959–1971

==== State attorneys general ====
As of January 2023 there are at least 20 Penn alumni who have been attorneys general in five states and the District of Columbia.

- Andrew Allen, class of 1759: last colonial attorney general of Pennsylvania, represented Province of Pennsylvania at the Second Continental Congress (later attained of treason for his Tory sympathies), elected to the Pennsylvania Assembly in 1766, and appointed by his brother in law John Penn to Governor's Council in 1770
- Thomas J. Baldrige, attorney general of Pennsylvania, judge and president judge of Superior Court of Pennsylvania
- Beau Biden: 44th attorney general of Delaware (2007–2015)
- William Bradford: justice of Pennsylvania Supreme Court (1791–1794), and attorney general of Pennsylvania (1780–91); attended Penn for three years before graduating from Princeton University
- Joseph M. Carey: attorney general of Wyoming (1869–71); justice, Wyoming Supreme Court (1871–1876) (also Mayor of Cheyenne, Wyoming, US attorney for the Territory of Wyoming, Governor of Wyoming, US Representative for Wyoming, US senator for Wyoming)
- Hampton L. Carson, attorney general of Pennsylvania, 1903–1907
- Paula Dow: 52nd attorney general of New Jersey (2010–2012)
- Lucius Elmer: former justice of New Jersey Supreme Court; 13th attorney general of New Jersey (1850–1852)
- William F. Hyland (Wharton class of 1944): 37th attorney general of New Jersey
- Daniel J. Layton (Penn Law class of 1901): chief justice of Delaware Supreme Court (1933–45); 29th Attorney General of Delaware (1932–33)
- John G. McCullough: attorney general of California during the American Civil War
- William M. Meredith: attorney general of Pennsylvania (1861–1867); president of the Philadelphia City Council (1834–1849)
- Karl Racine (College class of 1985): 15th attorney general of the District of Columbia (2015–2023)
- William Bradford Reed: attorney general of Pennsylvania (1838)
- Grover C. Richman Jr. (Penn Law class of 1934): 33rd attorney general of New Jersey (1954–1958)
- David Samson: 47th attorney general of New Jersey
- William A. Schnader: attorney general of Pennsylvania (1930–1934)
- Jonathan Sergeant, class of 1763: attorney general of Pennsylvania; member of the Continental Congress; framer of the New Jersey Constitution
- George Washington Woodruff: former attorney general of Pennsylvania

==== Other state, or local executive or judicial branch officials ====
- Branch Tanner Archer: Penn Medical School class of 1808: secretary of war for the Republic of Texas, 1840–1841
- Geoffrey Berman (born 1959): U.S. attorney for the Southern District of New York 2018–2020
- Kathryn Kathy Boockvar (born 1968), Penn College class of 1990: secretary of the Commonwealth of Pennsylvania and thus head of the Pennsylvania Department of State since 2019; previously senior adviser to the governor of Pennsylvania on Election Modernization; named co-chair of the Elections Committee of the National Association of Secretaries of State
- Raymond Broderick: lieutenant governor of Pennsylvania (1967–1971)
- Peter Brown: at-large Houston City Council member
- Robert Butkin: state treasurer of Oklahoma (1995–2005)
- David Byerman: secretary of the Nevada Senate (2010– )
- James Cannon, class of 1767: Scottish-born American mathematician; one of the principal draftsmen of the State of Pennsylvania Constitution of 1776; often described as the most democratic in America
- Harold L. Ervin, Pennsylvania Superior Court judge 1954–1967
- Mary Pat Clarke: first female president of the Baltimore City Council
- Bill Cobey: chairman of the North Carolina Republican Party (1999–2003)
- Margaret E. Curran: United States attorney of Rhode Island (1998–2003)
- John Morgan Davis: lieutenant governor of Pennsylvania (1959–1963)
- Stephen Dilts: commissioner of the New Jersey Department of Transportation
- Charles Djou: member of the Honolulu City Council
- Josiah E. DuBois Jr.: US State Department official highly instrumental in Holocaust rescue
- Norman Eddy: secretary of state of Indiana (1870–1872)
- Thomas J. Ellis: county commissioner of Montgomery County, Pennsylvania
- Jack Evans: Ward 2 member of the Council of the District of Columbia, resigned after several ethics violations (1991–2020)
- Mark Farrell: member of the San Francisco Board of Supervisors representing District 2 (2011–2018); became mayor of San Francisco for a few months in 2018
- James A. Finnegan: president of the Philadelphia City Council (1951–1955)
- F. Emmett Fitzpatrick: district attorney of Philadelphia (1974–1978)
- Daniel Garodnick: New York City Council member (2006– )
- Gary Gensler: chairman of the U.S. Commodity Futures Trading Commission (2009–2014); chairman of the U.S. Securities and Exchange Commission (2021–2025)
- Gerald Garson: New York Supreme Court justice (1998–2003); convicted in 2007 of accepting bribes
- Robert Gleason Jr.: chairman of the Republican State Committee of Pennsylvania
- Jonathan L. Goldstein: U.S. attorney for the District of New Jersey (1974–1977)
- W. Wilson Goode Jr.: city councilman at-large in Philadelphia (1999– )
- George Scott Graham: district attorney for Philadelphia County (1880–1899)
- David A. Gross: US coordinator for International Communications and Information Policy in the Bureau of Economic and Business Affairs
- Helen Gym: Philadelphia City council member (2016–2022)
- Morton Charles Hill (1936–2021) (Penn Law class of 1960, JD, Penn Graduate School class of 1961, MA): Yale University diplomat in residence and lecturer and United States State Department Foreign Service diplomat
- James Hutchinson, Medical School class of 1774: Penn trustee (1779–1781), Penn professor of materia medica and chemistry (1789–1791), Penn professor of chemistry (1791–1793), surgeon general of Pennsylvania (1778–1784)
- Barbara Judge: chairman of the Pension Protection Fund (2010–2016); chairman emeritus of UK Atomic Energy Authority; business ambassador for UK Trade and Investment
- Mike Kaplowitz: vice chairman of the Westchester County Board of Legislators in New York
- Virginia Knauer (1915–2011; class of 1937): first woman elected to the Philadelphia City Council (1960–1968), appointed head of Pennsylvania Bureau of Consumer Protection, President Richard Nixon's special assistant for consumer affairs in 1969 (which at the time made her the highest-ranking woman in the administration (1969–1977)), and was appointed by President Ronald Reagan as director of Office of Consumer Affairs (where she mentored her top assistant, Elizabeth Hanford and introduced her to her future husband, Robert Dole (1981–1989))
- Peter B. Krauser: chief judge on the Court of Special Appeals for the state of Maryland, and past chair of the Maryland Democratic Party
- Joseph L. Kun (Penn Law class of 1904): president judge, Court of Common Pleas of Philadelphia
- Stephen P. Lamb: judge and vice-chancellor of the Delaware Court of Chancery
- Tulio Larrínaga: resident commissioner of Puerto Rico (1904–1911)
- Frederica Massiah-Jackson: president judge on the Philadelphia County Court of Common Pleas (2000–2006)
- Robert Marion: justice of the peace for Charleston, South Carolina
- Robert McCord: treasurer of Pennsylvania (2009– )
- John G. McCullough: attorney general of California during Civil War
- Sybil Moses: prosecutor of the "Dr. X" Mario Jascalevich murder case; New Jersey Superior Court judge
- Eva Moskowitz: New York City Council member (1999–2005)
- David Norcross: past chairman of the New Jersey Republican State Committee
- Rai Okamoto: architect and director of planning for the City and County of San Francisco (1975–1980)
- John Robert Procter: president of the United States Civil Service Commission (1893–1903)
- Walter N. Read: chairman of the New Jersey Casino Control Commission (1982–1989)
- Laurie O. Robinson: former U.S. assistant attorney general; U.S. Department of Justice (1994–2000, 2009– )
- Doha Mekki, former acting assistant assistant attorney general for the Antitrust Division
- Rod J. Rosenstein: former U.S. deputy attorney general
- David Samson: former attorney general of New Jersey
- David M. Satz Jr.: US attorney for the District of New Jersey (1961–69)
- Michelle Schimel: Democratic member of the New York State Assembly (2007– )
- Bradley Schlozman: former head of the Civil Rights Division of the United States Department of Justice
- William E. Simkin: past director of the Federal Mediation and Conciliation Service, appointed by John F. Kennedy
- Edward Skyler: deputy mayor for Operations for New York City
- Martin Russell Thayer: president judge on the Philadelphia County Court of Common Pleas (1874–1896)
- Alex Wan: member of the Atlanta City Council (2010–2018)
- Joseph R. West: president of the Board of Commissioners of Washington, D.C. (1882–1883)
- Charles A. Waters (Penn Law class of 1916), Pennsylvania state treasurer and auditor general
- Hubert Work: chairman of the Republican National Committee (1928–1929)

=== Foreign governments ===
==== Heads of state and government ====
Penn alumni have served as heads of state of 11 different countries (in addition to the United States).

- Nnamdi Azikiwe: first president of Nigeria, 1963–1966
- Ernesto P. Balladares (MBA Wharton, 1970): president of Panama, 1994–1999
- Toomas Hendrik Ilves (University of Pennsylvania School of Arts and Sciences class of 1978, master's in Psychology): fourth president of Estonia, 2006–16
- Arturs Krišjānis Kariņš (born 1964), College class of 1988, BA, and Graduate School class of 1996, Ph.D., in linguistics where he graduated summa cum laude: in 2019 elected 14th prime minister of Latvia
- Vincas Krėvė-Mickevičius (1882–1954): prime minister of Lithuania June 24, 1940 – July 1, 1940 (de facto as he was appointed by unelected president not recognized by modern Lithuanian republic), former associate professor of Slavic Languages and Literatures
- Bongbong Marcos: seventeenth president of the Philippines
- Kwame Nkrumah (1909–1972; MS Ed., 1942; A.M., 1943): first president of Ghana, previously first prime minister of Ghana
- Alassane D. Ouattara (b. 1942; Ph.D. Econ., 1972): president of Côte d'Ivoire 2010–, prime minister of Côte d'Ivoire, 1990–1993
- Francisco Sagasti (Doctor of Philosophy degree in operational research and social systems science from the Wharton School of the University of Pennsylvania): 62nd president of Peru 2020–2021
- Cesar Virata (born 1930; MBA Wharton, 1953): 4th prime minister of the Philippines, 1981–1986
- William Walker (University of Pennsylvania School of Medicine class of 1843): president of the Republic of Nicaragua, 1856–1857

==== Mayors in cities not part of US ====
- Wayne Chiang Wan-an (Penn Law LLM class of 2004, JD class of 2006): 24th mayor of Taipei
- Ron Huldai: mayor of Tel Aviv (1998– )
- Mauricio Rodas: mayor of Quito (2014–2019)

==== Legislators, members of parliaments not part of the United States ====
- Yoginder K Alagh (MS, PhD): member of upper house of the bicameral Parliament of India, Rajya Sabha, also known as the Council of States (1996–2000)
- Douglas Alexander: Member of Parliament (United Kingdom) (1997–2015), served as chancellor of the Duchy of Lancaster, Scottish secretary, transport secretary and international development secretary in the cabinet under Prime Ministers Tony Blair and Gordon Brown, served Ed Miliband's shadow cabinet as shadow foreign secretary
- David Campbell Bannerman: member of the European Parliament for East of England (2009– )
- Suchan Chae (University of Pennsylvania School of Arts and Sciences class of 1985, Ph.D. in economics): former member of the National Assembly of Korea (2004–2008)
- Aziz Dweik (Penn Architecture School, Ph.D., class of 1988): speaker of the Palestinian Legislative Council of the Palestinian National Authority and interim president of the Palestinian National Authority
- Irving Gerstein: member of the Senate of Canada (2009–2016)
- John Wallace de Beque Farris: Canadian politician, member of the Senate of Canada (1937–1970), attorney general of Vancouver (1917–1920)
- Rajeev Gowda (Wharton PhD): member of Parliament, Rajya Sabha (2014–2020) from the Indian National Congress party
- George Hollingbery: British member of parliament (MP) (2010– )
- Edward Jenkin: Liberal Party member of Parliament in Great Britain; Agent-General of Canada
- Bongbong Marcos: senator from the Philippines
- Simón Gaviria Muñoz: president of the Chamber of Representatives of Colombia (2011– )
- Lindsay Northover, Baroness Northover: British politician in the House of Lords
- Philip Norton, Baron Norton of Louth: British member of the House of Lords (1998– )
- Douglas Peters: member of the Canadian Parliament (1993–1997)
- Sachin Pilot (Wharton MBA): member of Parliament, Lok Sabha (2004–2014) from the Indian National Congress party
- Mar Roxas: senator of the Philippines (2004–2010)
- Jayant Sinha (Engineering MS): member of Parliament, Lok Sabha (2014– ) from the Bharatiya Janata Party party
- Conrad Sangma (Wharton BS): member of Parliament, Lok Sabha (2016–2018) from the National People's Party party
- Puma Shen (LLM, 2007): member of the Taiwanese parliament
- Ashwini Vaishnaw (Wharton MBA class of 2010): member of Bharatiya Janata Party elected to be in Parliament of India representing Odisha State in the Rajya Sabha, the upper house in June 2019
- Mark Villar: senator of the Philippines (2022–present), secretary of Public Works and Highways (2016–2021), member of the House of Representatives from Las Pinas (2010–2016)

==== Foreign judiciary ====
- Peter Jacobson: judge of Federal Court of Australia (2002–15)
- Yvonne Mokgoro: judge for Constitutional Court of South Africa
- Ayala Procaccia: justice of Israel Supreme Court
- Sir Peter Marcel Roth, Penn Law LLM class of 1977): British High Court judge
- Sir Clive Sheldon: High Court judge
- Sir Ronald Wilson: former justice of High Court of Australia

==== Foreign ambassadors ====
- Patrick Dele-Cole (Penn Assistant Professor of History at the University of Pennsylvania, 1969–1973 and visiting professor of history, 1997): ambassador of Nigeria to Brazil, 1987–1991
- Ron Dermer: 18th Israeli ambassador to the United States (2013–2021)
- Shen Lyu-shun (Penn Graduate School of Arts and Sciences, MA, class of 1979, Ph.D. class of 1981: Republic of China representative to the US
- Roy Ferguson (Penn Graduate School of Arts and Sciences, MA in International Relations, class of 1973, as a Fulbright scholar): 15th New Zealand ambassador to the United States, New Zealand ambassador to South Korea, and New Zealand ambassador to North Korea
- Alfredo Toro Hardy (Penn Law LLM class of 1979), former ambassador of Venezuela to the United States, the United Kingdom, Spain, Brazil, Chile, Ireland and Singapore and former director of Venezuela's Diplomatic Academy
- Toomas Hendrik Ilves (born 1953), Penn Graduate School class of 1979, A.M.; ambassador of Estonia to the US, Canada, and Mexico, 1993–1996; Foreign Minister of Estonia, 1996–2001
- Andrés Rozental Gutman (born 1945), Penn Graduate School class of 1967, A.M.: ambassador of Mexico to Organization of American States (1971–1974); Sweden (1983–1988); United Kingdom (1995–1997); ambassador-at-large and special envoy of the president of Mexico (2000– )
- Bernardo Vega (born 1938) Wharton class of 1959, B.S. in Econ., Dominican ambassador to United States (1997–1999), governor of the Central Bank of the Dominican Republic (1982–1984)

==== Foreign government finance officials ====
- Zeti Akhtar Aziz: governor of the Central Bank of Malaysia
- Boediono: vice president of the Republic of Indonesia, 2009–2014
- Pridiyathorn Devakula: governor, Bank of Thailand, and former minister of finance
- Farouk El Okdah: governor of the Central Bank of Egypt (2003– )
- Eduardo Sojo Garza-Aldape: Mexican secretary of economy under President Felipe Calderón
- Alfonso Prat Gay: former president of the Central Bank of Argentina (2002–2004); former minister of economy of Argentina (2015–2016)
- C. Rangarajan: governor of the Reserve Bank of India (1992–1997), governor of Andhra Pradesh (1997–2003), additional governor of Orissa (1998–1999), additional governor of Tamil Nadu (2001–2002)
- Ignazio Visco: governor of the Bank of Italy (2011– )
- Ashwini Vaishnaw (Wharton MBA class of 2010): member of Bharatiya Janata Party who was appointed minister of railways, communications and electronics & information technology of India (2021– ) as cabinet minister in charge of railways and information iechnology, member of the Parliament of India representing Odisha State in the Rajya Sabha, 2019–
- Bernardo Vega (born 1938): Wharton class of 1959, B.S. in Econ., Dominican ambassador to United States (1997–1999), Governor of the Central Bank of the Dominican Republic (1982–1984)

==== Other foreign officials ====
- Yoginder K Alagh: past Union Minister of the Government of India
- John William Ashe: president of the United Nations General Assembly at its 68th session
- Luis Donaldo Colosio: Mexican politician and PRI presidential candidate assassinated while on the campaign trail
- Raymond Ch'ien Kuo Fung: member of the Executive Council of Hong Kong, 1992–2002; non-executive chairman, MTR Corporation Limited, 2003–present; chairman, Hang Seng Bank (2007– )
- Donald Duke: governor of Cross River State, Nigeria (1999–2007)
- Stefán Jón Hafstein Penn Annenberg School of Communications class of 1975: Icelandic writer and statesman in charge of Malawi
- Toomas Hendrik Ilves (born 1953), Penn Graduate School class of 1979, A.M.; foreign minister of Estonia, 1996–2001
- Chris Higgins: former secretary of the Department of Treasury for Australia (1989–1990)
- Ahsan Iqbal: past federal minister for Education for Pakistan
- Philip Jaisohn: prominent figure in Korean independence movement; first Korean to become a naturalized US citizen
- Cardozo M. Luna: 35th vice chief of staff of the Armed Forces of the Philippines
- Emilio Núñez (University of Pennsylvania School of Dental Medicine class of 1893): vice president of Cuba (1917–21); former Cuban minister of agriculture, commerce and labor; general in Cuban Liberation Army; civil governor of the province of Havana (1899–1902)
- Sachin Pilot: minister of state (Independent Charge) for Corporate Affairs in the Indian government (2012–2014); former minister of State for Communications and Information Technology (2014–2016)
- Taleb Rifai: secretary-general of the World Tourism Organization; past Minister of Information and Planning of Jordan; past minister of tourism and antiquities of Jordan
- Raul Roco: former presidential candidate and secretary of education in the Philippines
- Conrad Sangma: chief minister of the Indian state of Meghalaya; former Minister of Finance, Power and Tourism (Government of Meghalaya)
- Nabil Shaath: Wharton alumnus, former deputy prime minister and information minister of the Palestinian National Authority; foreign minister
- Sicelo Shiceka: minister of cooperative governance and traditional affairs under President Jacob Zuma in South Africa (2009–2012)
- Jayant Sinha: minister of state for civil aviation in the Indian government (2016– ); former minister of State for Finance (2014–2016)
- Ashwini Vaishnaw: minister of railways, communications, and electronics and information technology in the Indian government (2021– )

=== Lawyers, advisors, and civil rights leaders ===
- Sadie Tanner Alexander: first African-American woman to receive a Ph.D. in economics in the United States, to graduate from Penn Law, and to be admitted to the Pennsylvania Bar; civil rights activist; appointed to the Civil Rights Commission by President Harry S. Truman
- Gloria Allred: lawyer, feminist
- Wharton Barker: class of 1866: banker and publicist; financial advisor to the Russian government; 1900 Populist Party presidential candidate (receiving more than 50,000 votes)
- Ashley Biden: social worker, social justice activist, and daughter of President Joe Biden
- Gilbert F. Casellas: general counsel of the Air Force, 1993–1994; chair of the Equal Employment Opportunity Commission, 1994–97
- E. Wallace Chadwick: chief counsel to the United States Senate committee which investigated Senator Joseph R. McCarthy
- James Harry Covington: co-founder of Covington & Burling, a firm with more than 1,000 lawyers
- Henry Drinker: original name partner in Drinker Biddle & Reath, a firm with more than 650 lawyers
- Howard Gittis: Ron Perelman's corporate attorney
- Keith Gottfried: general counsel for the United States Department of Housing and Urban Development (HUD), 2005–2006
- Josh Gottheimer: speechwriter for Bill Clinton, strategist, member of the United States House of Representatives
- Charlie Brady Hauser: African-American arrested and jailed for refusing to move to back of a Greyhound bus in 1947; the case was thrown out of court
- Caroline Burnham Kilgore, 1838–1909: first woman to be admitted to the bar in the Commonwealth of Pennsylvania
- Martin Luther King Jr., 1950–1951: primary figure in the civil rights movement of the 1960s (took graduate courses, no degree)
- Kiyoshi Kuromiya: Japanese-American civil rights and anti-war activist; personal aide to Martin Luther King Jr.; co-founder of the LGBTQ activist groups Gay Liberation Front and ACT UP
- E. Grey Lewis: General Counsel of the Navy, 1973–1977
- William Draper Lewis: founder and first director of the American Law Institute
- Edwin Feulner: co-founder and former president of The Heritage Foundation
- Martin Lipton: founder of law firm Wachtell, Lipton, Rosen, & Katz
- Frank Luntz: Republican pollster and political strategist
- William M. Meredith, College class of 1812, Graduate School class of 1816: United States attorney for the United States District Court for the Eastern District of Pennsylvania, United States secretary of the treasury, attorney general of Pennsylvania, chief presiding officer and delegate to 1872 Pennsylvania state constitutional convention
- Paul Steven Miller: disability rights expert; EEOC Commissioner; professor at the University of Washington School of Law; special assistant to the president
- Juanita Jackson Mitchell: first black woman to practice law in Maryland, civil rights lawyer and activist with the NAACP
- Charles Eldridge Morgan Jr., class of 1864: co-founder of Morgan, Lewis & Bockius, one of the world's largest law firms, with about 1,900 lawyers
- John W. Nields Jr.: chief counsel for the House committee which investigated the Iran-Contra scandal
- Sheldon Oliensis: past president of the Legal Aid Society and the New York City Bar Association
- Alice Paul: women's suffrage leader, led a successful campaign that resulted in granting the right to vote to women in the US federal election in 1920
- George Wharton Pepper: founder of Pepper Hamilton LLP, a firm with more than 1,200 lawyers
- Steven P. Perskie: judge and politician
- Irving Picard: trustee of assets seized by the court from Bernard Madoff
- Eli Kirk Price II: founder, Philadelphia Museum of Art
- Howard J. Rubenstein: public relations lawyer and executive
- William A. Schnader: former attorney general of Pennsylvania; co-founder of Schnader, Harrison, Segal and Lewis (dissolved in 2023)
- Mitchell D. Silber: former director of intelligence analysis for the New York City Police Department 2007–2012; executive director of the Community Security Initiative, and expert in political risk, intelligence, and security analysis
- Bernard Segal: former president of the American Bar Association
- David Shrager: former president of the Association of Trial Lawyers of America
- Conrad Tillard (BA 1988): Baptist minister, radio host, author, civil rights activist, and politician
- Marietta Peabody Tree: US representative to the United Nations Commission on Human Rights under President John F. Kennedy
- George W. Wickersham: attorney general of the United States, name partner in Cadwalader, Wickersham & Taft, the oldest continuously operated law firm in the US; president of the Council on Foreign Relations (1933–1936)
- Maggie Williams: campaign manager for Hillary Clinton's 2008 presidential campaign

== Journalism ==
- Howard Arenstein: CBS News national correspondent
- Benjamin Franklin Bache, class of 1787: journalist, printer and publisher, grandson of Benjamin Franklin, early champion of the First Amendment
- Peter Barnes: senior Washington, D.C., correspondent for the Fox Business Network
- Willow Bay: former CNN and ABC anchorwoman, and fashion model
- Bruce Beattie: nationally syndicated political cartoonist and past president of the National Cartoonists Society
- Jeffrey Birnbaum: journalist and digital managing editor of the Washington Times
- Max Blumenthal (B.A. 1999): journalist
- Jim Braude: Emmy-winning news journalist
- Jean Chatzky: journalist, financial expert, best-selling author and motivational speaker on NBC's Today Show
- Nancy Cordes: CBS News chief White House correspondent
- Lisa DePaulo: journalist for national magazines (George, Elle, New York Magazine, Vanity Fair)
- Yochi Dreazen: journalist, The Wall Street Journal and National Journal
- Sabrina Erdely: reporter known for the discredited Rolling Stone article "A Rape on Campus"
- Stanley Fish: The New York Times op-ed columnist
- Adam Garfinkle: editor of The American Interest
- Stephen Glass: former reporter for The New Republic, author of The Fabulist
- Jeffrey Goldberg: journalist, Atlantic and The New Yorker
- John M. Goshko: B.A. in English; journalist, The Washington Post
- Mark Haines: CNBC business news anchor
- Evelyn Hockstein: photographer and photojournalist
- Abby Huntsman: journalist, reporter for Fox News Channel and co-host of Fox & Friends Weekend, host and producer at HuffPost Live; political commentator on MSNBC, CNN and ABC News; daughter of 2012 presidential candidate Jon Huntsman Jr.
- Joe Klein: columnist and political analyst for Time magazine
- Andrea Kremer: multi-Emmy Award-winning sports journalist
- Erik Larson: journalist and author of nonfiction books
- Betty Liu: anchorwoman for Bloomberg Television
- Megan McArdle: blogger and Washington Post columnist
- Sia Michel: journalist, newspaper and magazine editor
- Andrea Mitchell (B.A. 1967): NBC chief foreign affairs correspondent
- Amna Nawaz: Emmy-winning broadcast journalist
- Charles Ornstein: Pulitzer-winning journalist for the Los Angeles Times
- Christina Park: Fox News Channel anchorwoman
- Ashley Parker: Pulitzer-winning journalist for The Washington Post
- Maury Henry Biddle Paul: journalist credited with coining the term "café society"
- Norman Pearlstine: past editor-in-chief of Time Inc.
- Beth Reinhard: Pulitzer Prize-winning journalist for The Washington Post
- Alan Richman: journalist and food writer
- Tom Rinaldi: ESPN reporter and winner of 16 Sports Emmy Awards
- Alan Schwarz: Pulitzer Prize-nominated reporter for The New York Times
- Jamil Smith: winner of 3 Sports Emmy Awards
- I.F. Stone: journalist and commentator from the 1940s through the 1960s
- Bill Tomicki: journalist and travel writer
- Josh Tyrangiel (class of 1994): journalist, previously deputy managing editor of TIME magazine and editor at Bloomberg Businessweek
- Cenk Uygur: former MSNBC talk show host; radio talk show host, The Young Turks, Air America Radio; columnist for Huffington Post
- Samantha Vinograd: journalist, National Security Analyst at CNN
- David A. Vise: Pulitzer Prize-winning journalist
- Sidney Zion: writer, journalist

== Medicine ==
Four alumni and two faculty members have been awarded the Nobel Prize in Physiology or Medicine.

- Ephraim Leister Acker (1827–1903) earned his M.D. (Penn Med class of 1852) and LL.B. (Penn Law class of 1886): Pennsylvania representative to the US Congress, 1871–1873
- Robert Adams Jr. (1849–1906): class of 1869: member of St. Anthony Hall, studied law under preceptor George W. Biddle (and admitted to the bar in 1872 but never practiced law), served as member of the United States Geological Survey during the explorations of Yellowstone National Park; served in Pennsylvania State Senate appointed United States minister to Brazil, was elected to Congress to fill a vacancy and then served three terms as representative from the 2nd Pennsylvania district
- Pete Allen (1868–1946), Penn Med class of 1897: played one game in Major League Baseball for the Cleveland Spiders, specialized in proctology and was a member of the American Proctology Society, the American Medical Association and the Philadelphia County Medical Society, taught as an assistant professor of proctology at Jefferson Medical College
- Charles Conrad Abbott (1843–1919), Penn Med class of 1865: served as surgeon in Union Army during American Civil War and in 1876 discovered traces of human presence in the Delaware River Valley dating from the first or "Kansan" ice age, and inferentially from the pre-glacial period when humans are believed to have entered upon the North American continent
- David Hayes Agnew (1818–1892), Penn Med class of 1838: volunteered as consulting and operating surgeon when President James A. Garfield was fatally wounded by an assassin's bullet in 1881, and wrote The Principles and Practice of Surgery based on his experience of fifty active years, of practicing medicine, a three-volume set published 1878–1883
- William Wallace Anderson, Penn College class of 1846 and Penn Med class of 1849: built and partially designed National Historic Landmarks Church of the Holy Cross (Stateburg, South Carolina) and Borough House Plantation, which is the largest assemblage of high-style pisé (rammed earth) structures in the US
- John Archer, Penn Med class of 1768: first person to receive a medical degree from an American medical school; US congressman from Maryland
- John Light Atlee (1799–1885), Penn Med class of 1820: physician and surgeon, helped found Lancaster County Association of Physicians; helped organize the American Medical Association and served as its president;professor of anatomy at Franklin and Marshall College
- William Maclay Awl (1799–1876), Penn Med class of 1824 (did not graduate): acting superintendent of the Ohio "State Hospital," president of the Association of Superintendents of Asylums for the Insane of the United States and Canada, one of the founders of the Ohio State Medical Society
- Lewis Heisler Ball (1861–1932), Penn Med class of 1885: elected state treasurer of Delaware and to the US House of Representatives; appointed to US Senate for Delaware, later elected to Senate in the second popular election of a Senator in Delaware
- William P. C. Barton (1786–1856), Penn Med class of 1808: author of A Treatise Containing a Plan for the Internal Organization and Government of Marine Hospitals in the U.S.... and dean of Jefferson Medical College
- Carrie Bearden: professor, the David Geffen School of Medicine, University of California, Los Angeles.
- (Mary) Alice Bennett (1851–1925): physician; first woman to obtain a Ph.D. from the University of Pennsylvania (1880); first woman in Pennsylvania to direct a female division in a mental institution
- John Milton Bernhisel (1799–1881), Penn Med class of 1827: began practicing medicine in New York City but after became affiliated with the Latter Day Saint movement and moved to Nauvoo, Illinois, where he served as the personal physician to Joseph Smith, and living in Smith's home and delivering some of his children, followed Brigham Young west with the majority of the Latter-day Saints to Salt Lake City, Utah Territory, represented the Latter-day Saints before Congress to advocate for statehood as the State of Deseret, served in Congress, regent of the University of Utah, member of the Council of Fifty
- William Wyatt Bibb (1781–1820), Penn Med class of 1801: served one term in Georgia House of Representatives, was elected to United States Congress to fill a vacancy (an office to which he was reelected four times), was elected by the state legislature to the United States Senate to fill a vacancy, last governor of the Alabama Territory and first elected governor of Alabama
- Karin J. Blakemore: Penn College for Women class of 1974, leading medical geneticist and professor at Johns Hopkins School of Medicine, where she was director of Chorionic Villus Sampling Program and Laboratory, Alphafetoprotein (AFP) Referral Service, Prenatal Diagnostic Center, and Maternal-Fetal Medicine and that division's fellowship program; led team at the Johns Hopkins University's Institute of Genetic Medicine
- Leonard N. Boston: Medico-Chirurgical College of Philadelphia (merged into University of Pennsylvania School of Medicine), class of 1896, appointed Penn Med professor of physical diagnosis in 1912, and then associate professor of medicine in 1919, served as professor at the Women's Medical College of Pennsylvania (now part of Drexel University College of Medicine) in 1928
- Allan G. Brodie, DDS (1897–1976), University of Pennsylvania School of Dental Medicine (Penn Dental), class of 1919: dentist and orthodonist, teacher, writer, and researcher who, in 1929, was invited by Dean Frederick Bogue Noyes to the University of Illinois College of Dentistry to organize its Department of Orthodontics, one of the first graduate orthodontics departments established in the United States
- Michael S. Brown (born 1941), Penn College class of 1962 and Penn Med class of 1965: won the Nobel Prize in Physiology or Medicine in 1985 for describing the regulation of cholesterol metabolism and is also the 1985 recipient of the Albert Lasker Award for Basic Medical Research
- Hiram R. Burton (1841–1927), Penn Med class of 1868: elected to the US House of Representatives (for Delaware's at-large district) twice and served in Congress 1905–1909; also served as Delaware secretary of state
- Doc Bushong, DDS, Penn Dental class of 1882: first graduate from any school at Penn to play in Major League Baseball and since he played professional baseball during his time at Penn Dental he could not play for Penn
- Tom Cahill, Penn Med class of 1893 but left in 1891: played one season in Major League Baseball for the Louisville Colonels, died from an injury before finishing medical degree
- Charles Caldwell, Penn Med class of 1796: founder of the University of Louisville School of Medicine
- John Carson, college class of 1771: original trustee, rechartered University of Pennsylvania, and original incorporator and fellow of The College of Physicians of Philadelphia
- Samuel A. Cartwright, Penn Med alumnus from the 1810s who did not graduate: improved sanitary conditions during the Civil War and was honored for his investigations into yellow fever and Asiatic cholera but criticised for unscientific creation of diseases affecting enslaved and free blacks
- Henry H. Chambers, Penn Med class of 1811: US senator from Alabama
- Nathaniel Chapman (1780–1853), Penn Med class of 1800: physician who was the founding president of the American Medical Association in 1847, founded the American Journal of the Medical Sciences in 1820 where he served as its editor for a number of years, and also served as president of both the Philadelphia County Medical Society and the American Philosophical Society
- John Claiborne, Penn Med class of 1798: Virginia representative to Congress
- Lewis Condict, Penn Med class of 1794: New Jersey representative to Congress, trustee of Princeton College
- Samuel W. Crawford, Penn Med class of 1850: US Army surgeon, Union general in the Civil War
- William Holmes Crosby Jr. (1914–2005), Penn College class of 1936 and Penn Med class of 1940: a founding father of modern hematology; published more than 450 peer-reviewed papers in hematology, oncology, gastroenterology, iron metabolism, nutrition, and general medical practice; established in 1951 and was chief of the hematology and oncology specialties at Walter Reed Army Hospital until 1965; inventor of Crosby–Kugler capsule; published translator of poetry
- William Darlington, Penn Med class of 1804: War of 1812 major of a volunteer regiment, Pennsylvania representative to Congress
- William Potts Dewees, Penn Med class of 1806: obstetrician and author of System of Midwifery, a standard reference book on obstetrics
- Samuel Gibson Dixon (1851–1918): Penn Law class of 1877 and Penn Med class of 1886; also studied bacteriology at King's College London, and at Pettenkoffer's Laboratory of Hygiene in Munich before returning to Penn Med as the professor of hygiene; commissioner of the State Department of Health in Pennsylvania from 1905 until his death in 1918, during which time he worked for the prevention of tuberculosis and similar diseases by introducing sanitary and hygienic reforms that set new standards for government public health programs that saved thousands of lives
- Pliny Earle, class of 1837: physician, psychiatrist, poet; a founder of the American Medical Association, New York Academy of Medicine, Association of Medical Superintendents of American Institutions for the Insane, and New England Psychological Society
- Gerald Edelman (1929–2014), Penn Med class of 1954: biologist who shared the 1972 Nobel Prize in Physiology or Medicine for work on the immune system via research resulting in discovery of the structure of antibody molecules and was founder and director of The Neurosciences Institute
- Archibald Magill Fauntleroy: surgeon in the Confederate Army
- Clement Finley, Penn Med class of 1818: 10th surgeon general of the United States Army
- John Floyd, Penn Med class of 1804: 25th governor of Virginia, Virginia representative to Congress
- Walter Freeman Penn Med class of 1920: lobotomist who performed nearly 3500 lobotomies in 23 states; first neurologist in Washington, D.C.
- A.Y.P. Garnett (1820–1888), Penn Med class of 1842: president of the American Medical Association, and served Jefferson Davis physician to Robert E. Lee during the Civil War
- Donald Guthrie (1880–1958), Penn Med class of 1905: surgeon best known for establishing Guthrie Clinic in Sayre, Pennsylvania, in 1910, one of the earliest multi-specialty group medical practices, which he based on the principles he learned while a surgical resident (1906–1909) at Mayo Clinic in Rochester, Minnesota
- John Hahn (1776–1823), Penn Med class of 1798: elected to the Fourteenth Congress as a member of the US House of Representatives for Pennsylvania's 2nd congressional district 1815–1817
- Isaac Hays, Penn College class of 1816 and Penn Med class of 1822: ophthalmologist; first treasurer and founding member of Board of the American Medical Association and editor for over 50 years of American Journal of the Medical Sciences
- John Henry "Doc" Holliday, Dental School, class of 1872: western gambler and gunfighter
- David Jackson, Penn Med class of 1768: appointed to manage the lottery for costs of the American Revolutionary War, but resigned to become an army surgeon, Pennsylvania delegate to the Continental Congress in 1785 and 1786
- Joseph Jorgensen, Penn Med class of 1865: Virginia representative to Congress
- Martin M. Kaplan (1915–2004), virologist and WHO public health official
- Myint Myint Khin, MD (1923–2014): English major at the University of Rangoon, ultimately graduated from Penn Med with class of 1955, also did her residency at University of Pennsylvania, married (in 1953) to San Baw, a medical school classmate who received an MD and an MS from Penn Med, chair of Department of Medicine of the Institute of Medicine, Mandalay 1965–1984, consultant at World Health Organization 1985–1991, published 11 books in Burmese and two in English
- Albert Kligman, Ph.D., M.D.: University of Pennsylvania School of Arts and Sciences class of 1942 and Penn Med class of 1947; botanist and dermatologist who invented Retin-A, a popular acne medication
- Emily Kramer-Golinkoff, MBE, 2009: researcher, health activist, and cystic-fibrosis patient, founder of nonprofit Emily's Entourage
- David E. Kuhl: developer of positron emission tomography, also known as PET scanning, a nuclear medicine imaging technique
- Andrew Lam (ophthalmologist), Penn Med class of 2002: author and retinal surgeon
- Caleb R. Layton, Penn Med class of 1876: Delaware representative to Congress
- Francis Julius LeMoyne (attended Penn Med in 1821 but graduated from Jefferson Medical College): creator of the first crematory in the United States; abolitionist; founder of Washington, Pennsylvania's first public library (Citizen's Library); benefactor to LeMoyne–Owen College in Tennessee; his family house was utilized as part of the Underground Railroad and still stands today as a museum near the campus of Washington & Jefferson College in Pennsylvania
- Crawford Long, Penn Med class of 1839: surgeon and pharmacist, namesake of Emory University-operated Crawford Long Hospital
- Suzanne Mankowitz, Columbia University academic anesthesiologist
- George McClellan, class of 1819: founder of Jefferson Medical College, now Thomas Jefferson University
- Willoughby D. Miller (1853–1907), Penn Dental class of 1879 (first class to graduate): dentist and the first oral microbiologist, appointed dean of the University of Michigan School of Dentistry in 1906, but died in 1907, prior to assuming the position
- George Edward Mitchell, Penn Med class of 1805: Maryland representative to Congress
- Charles Delucena Meigs: pioneering leader in obstetrics
- John Peter Mettauer: first plastic surgeon in the US
- Nathan Francis Mossell (1856–1946), Penn Med class of 1882: first African-American graduate of Penn Med who did post-graduate training at hospitals in Philadelphia and London, first black physician elected as member of the Philadelphia County Medical Society, founder of Frederick Douglass Memorial Hospital and the Philadelphia branch of the NAACP
- Leo C. Mundy, Penn Med class of 1908 (1887–1944): physician and politician who served as a member of the Pennsylvania Senate for the 21st district and who served in the United States Army during World War I where he was placed in charge of a one-thousand-bed military hospital in France and received the distinguished service citation from General John Pershing for heroism in treating and evacuating wounded soldiers under fire
- Reuben D. Mussey, Penn Med class of 1809: wrote the first definitive history of tobacco documenting its dangers (1835); president of the American Medical Association
- Arnold Naudain, Penn Med class of 1810: served in the War of 1812 as surgeon of the Delaware Regiment, US senator from Delaware
- Arthur Percy Noyes (1880–1963), Penn Med class of 1906: served as superintendent of the Rhode Island state mental hospital and the Norristown, Pennsylvania, state mental hospital where he creating a psychiatric residency training programs for Penn Med, which lasted for over fifty years, and writing a seminal textbook, A Textbook on Psychiatry for Students and Graduates in Schools of Nursing which led to publication of his textbook Modern Clinical Psychiatry, served as president of the Philadelphia Psychiatric Society, Pennsylvania Psychiatric Society, and American Psychiatric Association
- Archibald E. Olpp (1882–1949), Penn Med class of 1908: physician and politician who was an instructor in chemistry at Lehigh University and in biological chemistry at the Columbia University College of Physicians and Surgeons; served as first lieutenant in the United States Medical Corps during the World War I; first Republican to be elected to Congress from the New Jersey's 11th congressional district
- John H. Outland, Penn Med class of 1899 (after starting at University of Kansas): one of the few men ever to win All-American football honors as both lineman and the backfield player; voted "Most Popular Man" in the entire University of Pennsylvania
- Mehmet Oz: surgeon, author and TV host
- John M. Patton, Penn Med class of 1818: Virginia representative to Congress
- William Pepper (1843–1898), Penn bachelor's degree 1862 and Penn Med class of 1864: lectured on morbid anatomy and clinical medicine and as professor at Penn and succeeded Dr. Alfred Still as professor of theory and practice of medicine; founded and editor of the Philadelphia Medical Times; elected provost of the University of Pennsylvania in 1881 and remained in that position until 1894; medical director of the United States Centennial Exhibition at Philadelphia in 1876; made Knight Commander of Saint Olaf by King Oscar II of Sweden founder of Philadelphia's first free public library
- Sidney Pestka: biochemist and geneticist; the "father of interferon"
- Philip Syng Physick, class of 1785: surgeon in post-colonial America; called "the father of American surgery"
- Stanley B. Prusiner (born 1942), Penn College class of 1964 and Penn Med class of 1968: neurologist and biochemist who discovered prions, resulting in him being awarded the Albert Lasker Award for Basic Medical Research in 1994 and the Nobel Prize in Physiology or Medicine in 1997 for prion research developed by him and his team of experts
- John H. Pugh, Penn Med class of 1852: New Jersey representative to Congress
- David Ramsay, Penn Med class of 1773, 1780 (Hon. M.D.): South Carolina delegate to the Continental Congress, one of the first major historians of the American Revolution
- Howard A. Rusk: founder of the Rusk Institute of Rehabilitation Medicine at NYU Langone Medical Center; "father of comprehensive rehabilitation"
- Jacob A. Salzmann (1901–1992), Penn Dental class of 1922: orthodontist known for developing an assessment index for determining malocclusion, which has been adopted by American Dental Association Council of Dental Health, the Council on Dental Care Programs, and by the American Association of Orthodontists
- Sandra Saouaf: earned her PhD from Penn in immunology
- Valentine Seaman: physician who introduced the smallpox vaccine to the US
- Gregg Semenza (born 1956), Penn Med class of 1982: professor of genetic medicine at the Johns Hopkins School of Medicine, where he is director of the vascular program at the Institute for Cell Engineering, is a 2016 recipient of the Albert Lasker Award for Basic Medical Research, is known for his discovery of HIF-1, which allows cancer cells to adapt to oxygen-poor environments, and shared the 2019 Nobel Prize in Physiology or Medicine for "discoveries of how cells sense and adapt to oxygen availability"
- Adam Seybert, Penn Med class of 1793: Pennsylvania representative to Congress
- Rajiv Shah, Penn Med class of 2001: former director of USAID, formerly at Bill and Melinda Gates Foundation; also alumnus of the Wharton School; president, Rockefeller Foundation
- Thomas Smith (University of Pennsylvania Medical School class of 1829): after obtaining his medical degree, was a surgeon on a merchant vessel that traveled to trade in several East Asian ports, spent nearly ten years in China and learned to speak Chinese; justice of Indiana Supreme Court (1847–1853)
- Isaac Starr (1895–1989), Penn Med class of 1920: interned at Massachusetts General Hospital, appointed Penn Med's first assistant professor in pharmacology, first Hartzell Professor of Research Therapeutics, dean 1945–1948, known as the father of ballistocardiography, and awarded the Albert Lasker Award of the American Heart Association "for fundamental contributions to knowledge of the heart and the circulation, and for his development of the first practical ballistocardiograph", Kober Medal of the Association of American Physicians, the Burger Medal of the Free University of Amsterdam, and an honorary Doctor of Science (Sc.D.) degree from University of Pennsylvania for his contributions to medicine
- Alexander Hodgdon Stevens: second president of the American Medical Association
- Alfred Stillé: the first secretary, and later president of the American Medical Association
- Joel Barlow Sutherland, Penn Med class of 1812: Pennsylvania representative to Congress, served in the War of 1812 as assistant surgeon to the "Junior Artillerists of Philadelphia"
- Wendy Sue Swanson, Penn Med class of 2003: pediatrician, social media activist, author of Seattle Mama Doc blog
- Hedge Thompson, Penn Med class of 1802: New Jersey representative to the Congress
- Edward Bright Vedder: US Army physician and noted researcher of beriberi
- Bert Vogelstein: cancer researcher at Johns Hopkins University
- Drew Weissman Penn faculty and winner of 2023 Nobel Prize in physiology (see also List of Nobel laureates by university affiliation)
- William Carlos Williams, Penn Med class of 1906, poet, pediatrician, and general practitioner
- Caspar Wistar, Penn Med class of 1782: president of the American Philosophical Society and president of the Society for the Abolition of Slavery
- George Bacon Wood, Penn Med class of 1818: compiled first Dispensatory of the United States (1833); president of both the College of Physicians of Philadelphia and American Medical Association
- Horatio C Wood Jr. [sic], Penn Med class of 1862: author of the 1874 work Treatise on Therapeutics, Special Prize from American Philosophical Society for his 1869 paper Research upon American Hemp, 1871 Warren Prize from Massachusetts General Hospital for Experimental Researches in the Physiological Action of Amyl Nitrite, 1872 Boylston Prize for Thermic Fever or Sunstroke, nephew of George Bacon Wood
- Joseph Janvier Woodward (1833–1884) (known as J.J. Woodward), Penn Med class of 1853): 34th president of the American Medical Association; pioneer in photomicrography, surgeon; performed the autopsies of Abraham Lincoln and John Wilkes Booth; attended to president James A. Garfield after he was shot

== Military ==
=== Medal of Honor recipients ===
- William R. D. Blackwood (1838–1922), University of Pennsylvania School of Medicine class of 1862: Medal of Honor recipient from the Civil War
- Cecil Clay (1842–1903), Penn class of 1864: joined fraternity St. Anthony Hall; Medal of Honor recipient and brevet brigadier general in the Civil War
- Joseph K. Corson (1836–1913)), University of Pennsylvania School of Medicine class of 1863: Medal of Honor recipient from the Civil War
- Henry A. du Pont (1838–1926): Medal of Honor recipient and lieutenant colonel from the American Civil War and elected twice by Delaware Assembly to United States Senate
- Frederick C. Murphy (1918–1945), University of Pennsylvania class of 1943: Medal of Honor recipient from World War II who attended Penn before enlisting in the United States Army

=== Air Force ===
- Thomas K. Finletter: US secretary of the Air Force, 1950–1953
- Harris Hull (1909–1993), Wharton School of Business and Finance: class of 1930 B.S. in Economics, decorated brigadier general of the United States Air Force (USAF) during World War II
- George G. Lundberg (1892–1981), Wharton School of Business and Finance: class of 1917 B.S. in Economics: appointed brigadier general of the USAF during World War II
- David G. Young III, MD (College class of 1971, BA in biology): United States Air Force brigadier general

=== Army ===
- Joseph Barnes: surgeon general (US Army) during and after Civil War
- Alexander Biddle: Union Army officer during the Civil War who fought at the Battle of Fredericksburg, the Battle of Chancellorsville, the Battle of Gettysburg (under Abner Doubleday) and the Battle of Bristoe Station; later, director of the Pennsylvania Railroad and the Philadelphia Savings Fund Society
- Jacob Brown, college class of 1790: commanding general of the US Army, 1821–1828; also major general and hero of the War of 1812
- Charles C. Byrne: US Army brigadier general
- Samuel W. Crawford: Civil War major general, one of only two officers to attain the rank of general and serve at both Fort Sumter and Appomattox
- Rolv Enge: decorated Norwegian resistance movement member from World War II (1942–1944)
- Francis J. Harvey (born 1943), Penn Graduate School of Arts and Sciences class of 1969, Ph.D. in Metallurgical Engineering and Materials Science 19th Secretary of the United States Army 2004– 2007
- Archibald Magill Fauntleroy: surgeon in the Confederate Army
- Clement Finley: 10th surgeon general of the US Army
- Lindley M. Garrison (Penn Law class of 1885, LLB): secretary of war under President Woodrow Wilson (1915–1916)
- John L. Gronski (MBA, 2003): US Army major general
- George Izard: general in the US Army during War of 1812
- David Jackson, class of 1768: surgeon in the Continental Army and delegate to the Constitutional Convention of 1785
- George B. McClellan: major general during the Civil War
- Montgomery C. Meigs: quartermaster general of the US Army with the rank of brigadier general during the Civil War; attended Penn, then graduated from the United States Military Academy
- Thomas Mifflin: major general in the Continental Army in the American Revolutionary War; President of the Continental Congress; first governor of Pennsylvania; signatory to the US Constitution
- James St. Clair Morton: Union Army brigadier general who built the Civil War's largest fort, Fortress Rosencrans in Tennessee
- Presley Neville: aide-de-camp to Major General Marquis de Lafayette during the Revolutionary War
- Robert Maitland O'Reilly: 20th surgeon general of the US Army
- Tench Tilghman, college class of 1761: lieutenant colonel and longest-serving aide-de-camp to General George Washington of the Continental Army during the Revolutionary War; Washington wrote about him: "...none could have felt his death with more regard than I did, because no one entertained a higher opinion of his worth"
- James Tilton: first titled surgeon general of the US Army; served in that capacity during the War of 1812
- Henry D. Todd Jr.: US Army major general, commanded artillery units during World War I
- Anthony Wayne: US Army general during the Revolutionary War; namesake of many towns, cities and counties across the United States; attended Penn but did not earn a degree
- William H. Winder: inspector general of the US Army during the War of 1812, later court-martialed and then acquitted
- Isaac J. Wistar: brigadier general of the Union Army during the Civil War and founder of the Wistar Institute in Philadelphia
- Dick Zeiner-Henriksen: highly decorated Norwegian resistance movement member from World War II

=== Coast Guard ===
- William Augustus Newell, class of 1839: a father of the modern-day United States Coast Guard; created the United States Life-Saving Service through the Newell Act, which merged with the Revenue Cutter Service to form the Coast Guard in 1915

=== Marine Corps ===
- William P. Biddle (class of 1875 and member of Delta Psi fraternity AKA St. Anthony Hall): major general and the 11th commandant of the United States Marine Corps
- George R. Christmas (class of 1962, B.A): retired USMC lieutenant general, and president and CEO of the Marine Corps Heritage Foundation
- Robert L. Denig (class of 1907, did not graduate): highly decorated (during World War I) brigadier general in the USMC, served as its first director of public information during World War II
- John Marston: major general during WWII
- Samuel Nicholas (Academy and College of Philadelphia class of 1759): founder and first commandant of the USMC, commissioned in 1775

=== Merchant Marine ===
- James A. Helis University of Pennsylvania School of Arts and Sciences, Master of Arts in political science: rear admiral and the 12th superintendent of the United States Merchant Marine Academy, 2012–2018
- Ted Weems: bandleader for the US Merchant Marine during World War II

=== Navy ===
- James Biddle: commodore and explorer whose flagship was the USS Columbus and whose brother was fellow Penn alumnus and financier Nicholas Biddle
- Adolph E. Borie: US secretary of the Navy under President Ulysses S. Grant
- Kenneth Braithwaite: Penn, Fels Institute of Government (class of 1995, master's degree in government administration) retired United States Navy one-star rear admiral; as of December 7, 2020, is serving as the 77th secretary of the Navy since May 29, 2020; nominated by President Donald Trump on March 2, 2020, and sworn in on May 29, 2020 and previously served as U.S. ambassador to Norway under President Donald J. Trump
- John Howard Dalton (Wharton Graduate School class of 1971, MBA): 70th secretary of the Navy 1993–1998
- Thomas S. Gates Jr. (Penn College class of 1928, A.B., and Hon. LL.D., 1956, trustee): 7th United States secretary of defense (1959–1961) and secretary of the Navy
- Stephen Decatur: commodore noted for his heroism during the First Barbary War and the War of 1812, he was the youngest man ever to attain the rank of captain in the United States Navy (USN); namesake of many communities and counties in the US
- Nancy J. Lescavage: rear admiral, 20th director of the Navy Nurse Corps
- Mary Joan Nielubowicz: director of the Navy Nurse Corps, 1983–1987
- Julie Roland: lieutenant commander and aviator
- William Ruschenberger: surgeon for the USN and president of the Academy of Natural Sciences of Philadelphia 1870–1882, and president of the College of Physicians of Philadelphia 1879–1883
- Richard Somers: naval officer and namesake of Somers, New York, and Somers Point, New Jersey
- James A. Zimble: 30th surgeon general of the USN

== Philosophy, theology, and religion ==
- Clive Orminston Abdulah: Episcopal bishop of Trinidad and Tobago (retired)
- David Werner Amram: early American Zionist
- Reverend John Andrews D.D.: minister, professor and provost of the University of Pennsylvania
- Marla Rosenfeld Barugel: one of the first two female hazzans (also called cantors) ordained in Conservative Judaism
- Frederic Mayer Bird, class of 1857: clergyman, educator, and hymnologist.
- Kirbyjon Caldwell: former pastor of the Windsor Village United Methodist Church, a 14,000-member megachurch in Houston, Texas; delivered the official benediction at the 2001 and 2005 inaugurations of President George W. Bush, and officiated at the wedding of his daughter, Jenna Bush
- John Nicholson Campbell: chaplain of US House of Representatives (1820–21)
- Thomas Clinton: religious leader instrumental in the formation of the US Presbyterian Church
- William Creighton, class of 1931: former Episcopal bishop of Washington, D.C.; Navy chaplain during World War II; participated in the funeral procession of President John F. Kennedy
- Thomas Frederick Davies Sr., class of 1871: third bishop of the Episcopal Diocese of Michigan (1889–1905)
- Kaji Douša, Immigrant rights activist; senior pastor, Park Avenue Christian Church, NYC
- Jacob Duché, class of 1757: first chaplain to the Continental Congress
- George Duffield: early Presbyterian minister and member of the Board of Regents of the University of Michigan
- Mary Fels (1863–1953) (attended for one year circa 1881–1882) philanthropist, suffragist, philosopher, economist (Georgist)
- James A. Flaherty: Supreme Knight of the Knights of Columbus (1909–27)
- Joan Friedman: first woman to serve as a rabbi in Canada (1980)
- Jeannine Gramick: Roman Catholic nun; co-founder of the activist organization New Ways Ministry
- Dmitry Grigorieff: dean emeritus of St. Nicholas Cathedral in Washington, D.C.
- Elwood Lindsay Haines: Episcopal bishop of the Diocese of Iowa (1944–49)
- William Hobart Hare: bishop of the Episcopal Church, elected in 1872
- John Henry Hobart: third Episcopal bishop of New York (1816–1830)
- Malcolm Hoenlein: executive vice chairman of the Conference of Presidents of Major American Jewish Organizations
- Naamah Kelman: first woman in Israel to become a rabbi
- Gottlob Frederick Krotel: president of the General Council of the Evangelical Lutheran Church in North America, 1870; founder of the Holy Trinity Lutheran Church in New York City
- Samuel Magaw, class of 1757 and 1760: Anglican priest and missionary of the Society for the Propagation of the Gospel
- James J. Martin: Jesuit priest, writer and culture editor of the Jesuit magazine America
- Joseph Sakunoshin Motoda: first Japanese born Bishop of Tokyo in the Nippon Sei Ko Kai, the Anglican Church in Japan
- William Augustus Muhlenberg, class of 1815 and 1818: clergyman; founded the infirmary which became St. Luke's Hospital in New York City; later superintendent and chaplain of the institution
- James De Wolf Perry: Episcopal clergyman and prelate; 7th Bishop of Rhode Island (1911–1946); 18th presiding bishop of the Episcopal Church (1930–1937)
- Ellis T. Rasmussen: Mormon scholar, missionary and dean of religious instruction at Brigham Young University
- Robert Knight Rudolph: professor of systematic theology and Christian ethics at the Reformed Episcopal Seminary in Philadelphia
- Theodore Emanuel Schmauk, class of 1883: Lutheran minister, educator, author and church theologian; president of General Council of the Evangelical Lutheran Church in North America (1903–1920)
- John George Schmucker: co-founder of the General Synod of the Lutheran Church in the United States
- Francis B. Schulte: prelate of the Roman Catholic Church who served as bishop of Wheeling–Charleston, West Virginia, 1985–1988, and archbishop of New Orleans, 1989–2001
- Frank W. Sterrett: prelate who served as Episcopal bishop of Bethlehem (Pennsylvania) (1928–54)
- William Bacon Stevens: fourth bishop of Episcopal Diocese of Pennsylvania (1865–87)
- Ernest Adolphus Sturge: general superintendent of Japanese Presbyterian Church
- Jacob Joseph Taubenhaus: founder of Hillel at Texas A & M University
- Edward Thomson: bishop of the Methodist Episcopal Church (the United Methodist Church), elected in 1864
- Philip Lindel Tsen: Anglican bishop in China in the 19th century
- Elizabeth Ursic: theologian and scholar
- Amina Wadud: Muslim theologian; activist for social justice; renown scholar of progressive Islam; one of the founding thinkers of Islamic feminism; author and academic
- William White: the first and later the fourth presiding bishop of the Episcopal Church in the US (1789; 1795–1836); first bishop of the Diocese of Pennsylvania (1787–1836); second US Senate chaplain (1790)
- Robert Watson Wood: clergyman of the United Church of Christ, early activist for LGBT rights
- Royden Yerkes: church historian and theologian, Episcopal priest

== Science and technology ==
- Charles Conrad Abbott: class of 1865: archaeologist and naturalist; assistant curator of the Peabody Museum of Archaeology and Ethnology in Cambridge, Massachusetts, to which he presented more than 20,000 archaeological specimens
- William Louis Abbott: ornithologist, namesake of numerous animal species
- Robert Adams Jr.: Penn graduate, served as a botanist with Penn professor Ferdinand Vandeveer Hayden while exploring the northwest corner of Wyoming; their efforts led directly to the founding of Yellowstone National Park, the first US national park
- Christian Anfinsen: Nobel laureate, chemist, and past Guggenheim fellow
- Charles Bachman: Turing Award winner, pioneer of database management systems
- William Baldwin, class of 1807: scientist whose personal papers are included in the collection of the Harvard University Herbarium
- Daniel Barringer (Penn Law class of 1882): first person to prove the existence of a meteorite crater on Earth; namesake of the mile-wide Barringer Crater in Arizona
- William Bartram: 18th- and 19th-century naturalist, attended Penn but did not earn a degree
- Alfred P. Boller: bridge designer and structural engineer; chief engineer of Manhattan's elevated railroad track system, the first of its kind in the world
- Gonzalo Castro de la Mata: Peruvian ecologist; promoter of free-market solutions to environmental issues; chairman of the Inspection Panel of the World Bank since 2014
- Jeffrey Chuan Chu: core member of the engineering team that designed the first American electronic computer, the ENIAC
- Edward Drinker Cope: 19th-century paleontologist who made known as many as 1,000 new species of extinct vertebrata in his lifetime, including some of the oldest known mammals, and 56 species of dinosaur, including Camarasaurus, Amphicoelias, and Coelophysis; most of his fossil collection is now with the American Museum of Natural History; his Philadelphia home is designated a National Historic Landmark
- Blossom Damania: virologist
- David DiVincenzo: theoretical physicist; with Daniel Loss, proposer of the spin qubit quantum computer (Loss–DiVincenzo quantum computer)
- J. Presper Eckert: inventor of the first general-purpose electronic digital computer (ENIAC); designed the first commercial computer in the US, the UNIVAC; National Medal of Science recipient
- William Gambel: 19th-century naturalist who discovered several new species of flora and fauna, including Gambel's quail (Callipepla gambelii), mountain chickadee (Parus gambeli) and Nuttall's woodpecker (Picoides nuttallii)
- Emil Grosswald: mathematician
- Edward Guinan: co-discoverer of Neptune's ring structure
- George Hedges: celebrity lawyer and archeologist who discovered the ancient city of Ubar
- Morton Heilig: cinematographer; inventor of the Sensorama device; "father of virtual reality"
- George H. Heilmeier: engineer; inventor of the LCD; National Medal of Science laureate;inductee of the National Inventor's Hall of Fame
- George Henry Horn: entomologist; president of Entomological Society of Philadelphia and of its successor, the American Entomological Society; his insect collections are now in the Museum of Comparative Zoology at Harvard University
- Vera Huckel was a mathematician and aerospace engineer and one of the first female "computers" at NASA
- Horace Jayne: zoologist and educator; dean of the college faculty of the Wistar Institute; trustee of Drexel University
- Jotham Johnson: past president of Archaeological Institute of America
- J. Clarence Karcher: geophysicist and businessman who invented and commercialized the reflection seismograph, the means by which most of the world's oil reserves have been discovered
- William H. Keating: 19th-century geologist, explorer, and Penn professor; co-founder of the Franklin Institute in Philadelphia
- Christian J. Lambertsen: inventor of the US Navy frogmen's rebreathers for underwater breathing, the first device to be called "SCUBA"
- Robert Lanza: chief scientific officer of Advanced Cell Technology
- Henry Carvill Lewis: geologist
- John Peter Lesley: geologist; with fellow alumni John Fries Frazer and James C. Booth, participated in the first geological survey of Pennsylvania
- John C. Lilly: researcher of consciousness; counterculture figure
- Yueh-Lin Loo: chemical engineer
- Ollie Luba: principal creator and lead designer at Lockheed Martin of the GPS III (Global Positioning System, Block IIIA)
- Henry Chapman Mercer: archaeologist whose work and museum, the Mercer Museum, inspired Henry Ford to open his own museum, The Henry Ford, in Dearborn, Michigan
- Janet Monge: curator of the physical anthropology section at the Penn Museum, named by Philadelphia Magazine as "Best Museum Curator" in 2014
- Robert Thomas Moore: namesake and benefactor of the Moore Laboratory of Zoology at Occidental College; past chair of the Galápagos Commission of Ecuador and fellow of the American Ornithologists' Union
- Ei-ichi Negishi: Nobel laureate and Herbert C. Brown Distinguished Professor of Organic Chemistry at Purdue University
- Helen Palmatary: anthropologist, expert on Indigenous ceramics from the Amazon
- Charles S. Parmenter: chemist and member of the National Academy of Sciences
- Mary Engle Pennington: pioneering bacteriologist, chemist and authority on refrigeration as a food preservative; chief of the United States Department of Agriculture Food Research Laboratory; recipient of the Garvan–Olin Medal, the highest award given to women in the American Chemical Society; inductee of the National Women's Hall of Fame, the ASHRAE Hall of Fame, and the National Inventor's Hall of Fame
- Frank Piasecki: inventor of one of the first helicopters; first to develop a tandem-rotor helicopter;received the country's highest technical honor, the National Medal of Technology, and the Smithsonian National Air and Space Museum Lifetime Achievement award
- Michael O. Rabin: Turing Award winner, attended Penn for graduate studies before transferring to Princeton University
- Susan Rigetti: software engineer and author
- Fairman Rogers: civil engineer and charter member of the National Academy of Sciences
- George E. Smith, College class of 1955: Nobel laureate and co-inventor of the charge-coupled device, the electronic eye of a digital camera
- James Mourilyan Tanner: child development expert
- Frederick Winslow Taylor (1856–1915), honorary Doctor of Science awarded October 19, 1906: mechanical engineer widely known for his methods to improve industrial efficiency, one of the first management consultants, author of The Principles of Scientific Management (which, in 2001, Fellows of the Academy of Management voted the most influential management book of the twentieth century), instrumental in the creation and development of industrial engineering and scientific management (sometimes referred to as Taylorism), elected president of American Society of Mechanical Engineers (1906) and American Philosophical Society (1912)
- Ralph Teetor: blind inventor of automotive cruise control; member of the Automotive Hall of Fame
- James Thomso: developmental biologist known for deriving the first human embryonic stem cell line in 1998; member of the National Academy of Sciences
- Ernest S. Tierkel: epidemiologist known as "Dr. Rabies" for his extensive work with the disease
- Benjamin Chew Tilghman: inventor of the patented process known as sandblasting
- James W. VanStone: anthropologist and past chair of the Anthropology Department at the Field Museum of Natural History in Chicago
- Caspar Wistar, class of 1782: professor of chemistry, anatomy and surgery at Penn; University Trustee; namesake of Wistar Institute in Philadelphia; president of American Philosophical Society; president of Society for the Abolition of Slavery (Pennsylvania Abolition Society)
- Lightner Witmer: founder of clinical psychology; co-founder of the world's first psychological clinic in 1896 at the University of Pennsylvania
- Jack Keil Wolf: computer scientist; member of the National Academy of Sciences and the National Academy of Engineering; fellow of the American Academy of Arts and Sciences
- Horatio C Wood Jr.: physician, professor, and member of the National Academy of Sciences
- Samuel Washington Woodhouse: 19th-century explorer and naturalist
- Nathaniel Wyeth: mechanical engineer, known for creating the recyclable polyethylene terephthalate (PET) semi-rigid beverage containers widely used for water and carbonated beverages today; member of the Society of the Plastics Hall of Fame; fellow of the American Society of Mechanical Engineers
- H. C. Yarrow: 19th- and 20th-century ornithologist, naturalist and surgeon; trustee of George Washington University
- Roger Arliner Young: first African American woman to receive a doctorate degree in zoology
- Ahmed H. Zewail: Nobel laureate; 1993 recipient of the Wolf Prize in chemistry; 1996 recipient of the NAS Award in Chemical Sciences
- Eliya Zulu: demographer and founder of the African Institute for Development Policy

== Other ==
- Nicole Eustace: American historian, won the 2022 Pulitzer Prize for History
- Mackenzie Fierceton, activist who has sued university over its role in investigation of her alleged abusive childhood that led to her withdrawing from her Rhodes scholarship in case still being litigated
- Alice West Fleet, educator, one of the first black women to obtain a master's degree at Penn who was first black teacher in Fairfax county, Virginia, to teach at a previously all-white school and for whom an elementary school is named
- Lee K. Frankel: social worker and insurance executive
- Helene Gayle: CEO of CARE International
- Joel Henry Hildebrand: past president of Sierra Club
- Edward Hirsch: president of John Simon Guggenheim Memorial Foundation
- Amandus Johnson: founding curator of the American Swedish Historical Museum
- Evan Kohlmann: NBC terrorism analyst
- Kiyoshi Kuromiya (1943–2000) (College class of 1966): a Benjamin Franklin scholar, born in the World War II-era Japanese American internment camp known as Heart Mountain, author and civil rights, anti-war, gay liberation, and HIV/AIDS activist who was an aide to Martin Luther King Jr. and a prominent opponent of the Vietnam War and one of the founders of the Gay Liberation Front in Philadelphia and founded the first LBGQT+ Penn funded group
- John A. Lafore Jr.: past president of American Kennel Club
- Reggie Love (M.B.A. 2012): former personal aide to 44th U.S. President Barack Obama
- Patrick Murphy Malin: past executive director of the American Civil Liberties Union
- Scott Nearing (1883–1983), Penn Law class of 1904 (dropped out) Wharton class of 1905 (BS) and class of 1909 (Ph.D.): 20th-century conservationist, peace activist, educator, writer and economist
- John Nolen, class of 1893: urban planner, designed and developed large-scale projects for dozens of US cities, including San Diego, Charlotte, North Carolina, and Madison, Wisconsin
- Lydia Nyati-Ramahobo: Motswana linguistic scholar and activist
- William Pepper: founder of Free Library of Philadelphia (the public library system of Philadelphia)
- Clyde V. Prestowitz Jr.: Reagan administration official; president of Economic Strategy Institute
- Carmen Rivera de Alvarado: Puerto Rican social worker, educator and activist
- Robert Empie Rogers: president of Franklin Institute, 1875–79
- Evelyn Ay Sempier, College for Women class of 1957: Miss America 1954
- Francis Alexander Shields: aristocrat; father of actress Brooke Shields
- Brandon Sosna: sports administrator and executive
- Andy Stern: president, Service Employees International Union
- Jack Thayer: 17-year-old first-class passenger on the RMS Titanic who provided several first-hand accounts of the disaster
- Kenneth Thibodeau: pioneer in electronic records management
- Sir Henry Worth Thornton: president, Canadian National Railway; winning Vanderbilt University football coach 1894; knighted by King George V
- Joseph M. Torsella: president and CEO of the National Constitution Center in Philadelphia; Rhodes Scholar
- Henry R. Towne: developer of the Yale lock; former president of American Society of Mechanical Engineers
- Tiffany Trump (B.A. 2016): socialite, fourth oldest child of 45th and 47th U.S. president and Penn alumnus Donald Trump
- Charles Wall: resident director of George Washington's estate at Mount Vernon on the banks of the Potomac River (1937–1976)
- Miles Taylor: public transport advocate and YouTuber for channel Miles in Transit

=== Notorious ===
- Bob Asher: chairman of the Republican State Committee of Pennsylvania; convicted of perjury, racketeering, conspiracy and bribery in 1987 in connection with a state contract award
- John Eleuthère du Pont: Penn dropout and Dupont family heir; convicted of the murder of Olympic gold medalist wrestler Dave Schultz
- Joshua Eilberg: Pennsylvania representative to the US Congress, 1967–1979; plead guilty to conflict of interest charges and was sentenced to 5 years of probation and fined $10,000
- Ira Einhorn: murderer nicknamed the "Unicorn Killer"
- Frank S. Farley: New Jersey state senator, protégé and successor of mobster and political boss Enoch L. Johnson in leading the Republican Party political machine and crime syndicate of Atlantic City (transferred to Georgetown University)
- Vince Fumo: Pennsylvania state senator convicted of 137 federal corruption charges in 2009
- Gerald Garson: former New York State Supreme Court Justice, convicted of bribery
- Kermit Gosnell: non-graduate serial killer and fraudulent physician, convicted of murdering three infants
- Carl Gugasian: bank robber
- Adam C. Hochfelder: co-founder of New York City real estate firm, Max Capital; convicted of fraud and grand larceny
- Norman Hsu: convicted pyramid scheme investment broker
- Jho Low: a financier linked to the 1Malaysia Development Berhad corruption scandal
- Luigi Mangione: suspect in the killing of UnitedHealthcare CEO Brian Thompson
- Sarma Melngailis (born 1972), Penn College and Wharton (class of 1994): vegan chef convicted of stealing $2 million from supporters, sentenced to 4 months in jail
- Michael Milken: billionaire who pleaded guilty to six counts of securities and tax violations, later pardoned by President Donald J. Trump
- Nirav Modi: Penn dropout, fraudster and fugitive wanted by the Interpol for criminal conspiracy
- Raj Rajaratnam: billionaire hedge fund manager convicted of insider trading
- J. Parnell Thomas: convicted fraudster, later pardoned by President Harry S. Truman
- Blondy Wallace: bootlegger and convicted tax evader
- Norman Tweed Whitaker: International Master of chess who served time in prison for his role in the Lindbergh kidnapping

== Honorary ==
=== U.S. presidents ===
- Dwight David Eisenhower, honorary Doctor of Law, class of 1947: 34th president of the United States
- James A. Garfield, honorary doctorate, class of 1881: 20th president of the United States
- Herbert Hoover, honorary doctorate, class of 1917: 31st president of the United States
- Franklin Delano Roosevelt, honorary Doctor of Law, class of 1940: 32nd president of the United States]
- Theodore Roosevelt, honorary doctorate, class of 1905: 26th president of the United States
- William Howard Taft, honorary doctorate, class of 1902: 27th president of the United States
- George Washington, honorary Doctor of Law, class of 1783: 1st president of the United States
- Woodrow Wilson, honorary doctorate, class of 1903: 28th president of the United States

=== Others ===
- Ebenezer Kinnersley (1711–1778), honorary master's, class of 1757: English-born scientist, inventor and lecturer, specializing in the investigation of electricity with Benjamin Franklin
- Thomas Paine: honorary master's, class of 1780

== Fictional alumni ==
- Andrew Beckett: gay, HIV-positive lawyer (notable for being one of the first mainstream Hollywood films to acknowledge a character with HIV/AIDS) in the 1993 movie Philadelphia whose former boss states he hired Beckett upon his graduation from University of Pennsylvania Law School, was portrayed by Tom Hanks (for which Hanks won the Academy Award for Best Actor at the 66th Academy Awards).
- Dr. Mark Craig: Chief of Surgery at St. Eligius Hospital in St. Elsewhere, played by William Daniels, is a Penn alumnus.
- Anthony "Tony" Judson Lawrence: portrayed by Paul Newman in the 1959 film The Young Philadelphians; graduate of the University of Pennsylvania Law School. The film is based on the 1956 novel The Philadelphian, by Richard P. Powell
- Ethan Hunt: Impossible Mission Force field agent and protagonist of the Mission: Impossible film series played by Tom Cruise. As revealed in Mission: Impossible – Fallout, Hunt double majored in Electrical Engineering from the School of Engineering and Applied Sciences and in International Relations from the College of Arts and Sciences at Penn.
- Chuck McGill: attorney in Better Call Saul (who led Penn's debate team to national championship three years running and won the Larkin Prize) played by Michael McKean
- Tom Raikes, a lawyer portrayed by Thomas Cocquerel in The Gilded Age
- Deandra Reynolds, twin sister of Dennis Reynolds and the waitress at Paddy's Pub, who did not graduate but majored in psychology, portrayed by Kaitlin Olson in the sitcom It's Always Sunny in Philadelphia
- Dennis Reynolds: narcissistic and selfish character who minored in psychology and was a brother at a fraternity, portrayed by Glenn Howerton in the sitcom It's Always Sunny in Philadelphia
- Gary Shepherd, literature professor and lead character on Thirtysomething, portrayed by Peter Horton, Penn alum
- Michael Steadman, advertising executive and lead character on Thirtysomething, portrayed by Ken Olin, graduated from Penn
- Janine Teagues, portrayed by Quinta Brunson, a Penn alum who is a second grade teacher at Abbott Elementary, a fictional public school in West Philadelphia
- Louise Wexford, portrayed by Alysia Reiner on Younger, graduated from Wharton

== Nobel laureates ==
=== Physics ===
- George E. Smith: 2009 Nobel Prize in Physics "for the invention of an imaging semiconductor circuit—the CCD sensor"
- Raymond Davis: 2002 Nobel Prize in Physics for "pioneering contributions to astrophysics, in particular for the detection of cosmic neutrinos"
- John Robert Schrieffer: 1972 Nobel Prize in Physics (first Penn faculty member to win) for the "theory of superconductivity, usually called the BCS-theory"
- Robert Hofstadter: 1961 Nobel Prize in Physics "for his pioneering studies of electron scattering in atomic nuclei and for his thereby achieved discoveries concerning the structure of the nucleons"

=== Chemistry ===
- Ei-ichi Negishi: 2010 Nobel Prize in Chemistry (earned Ph.D. at Penn School of Arts and Sciences due to having won a Fulbright Scholarship awarded in 1963) for "palladium-catalyzed cross couplings in organic synthesis"
- Irwin Rose: 2004 Nobel Prize in Chemistry "for the discovery of ubiquitin-mediated protein degradation"
- Alan MacDiarmid: 2000 Nobel Prize in Chemistry "for the discovery and development of conductive polymers"
- Hideki Shirakawa: 2000 Nobel Prize in Chemistry "for the discovery and development of conductive polymers"
- Alan J. Heeger: 2000 Nobel Prize in Chemistry "for the discovery and development of conductive polymers"
- Ahmed H. Zewail: 1999 Nobel Prize in Chemistry "for his studies of the transition states of chemical reactions using femtosecond spectroscopy"
- Christian B. Anfinsen: 1972 Nobel Prize in Chemistry "for his work on ribonuclease, especially concerning the connection between the amino acid sequence and the biologically active conformation"
- Vincent du Vigneaud: 1955 Nobel Prize in Chemistry "for his work on biochemically important sulphur compounds, especially for the first synthesis of a polypeptide hormone"

=== Medicine ===
- Katalin Karikó and Drew Weissman: 2023 Nobel Prize in Physiology or Medicine "for their discoveries concerning nucleoside base modifications that enabled the development of effective mRNA vaccines against COVID-19"
- Gregg Semenza: 2019 Nobel Prize in Physiology or Medicine "for their discoveries of how cells sense and adapt to oxygen availability"
- Harald zur Hausen: 2008 Nobel Prize in Physiology or Medicine "for his discovery of human papilloma viruses causing cervical cancer"
- Stanley B. Prusiner: 1997 Nobel Prize in Physiology or Medicine "for his discovery of Prions: a new biological principle of infection"
- Michael S. Brown: 1985 Nobel Prize in Physiology or Medicine for his discovery "concerning the regulation of cholesterol metabolism"
- Baruch Samuel Blumberg: 1976 Nobel Prize in Physiology or Medicine "for their discoveries concerning new mechanisms for the origin and dissemination of infectious diseases"
- Gerald Edelman: 1972 Nobel Prize in Physiology or Medicine for the discovery "concerning the chemical structure of antibodies"
- Haldan Keffer Hartline: 1967 Nobel Prize in Physiology or Medicine for the discovery "concerning the primary physiological and chemical visual processes in the eye"
- Ragnar Granit: 1967 Nobel Prize in Physiology or Medicine "for describing the different types of light-sensitive cells in the eye and how light interacts with them"
- Richard Kuhn: 1938 Nobel Prize in Physiology or Medicine "for his work on carotenoids and vitamins"
- Otto Fritz Meyerhof: 1922 Nobel Prize in Physiology or Medicine "for his discovery of the fixed relationship between the consumption of oxygen and the metabolism of lactic acid in the muscle"

=== Economics ===
- Claudia Goldin: 2023 Nobel Prize in Economics "for having advanced our understanding of women's labor market outcomes”
- Robert Shiller: 2013 Nobel Prize in Economics "for their empirical analysis of asset prices"
- Thomas J. Sargent: 2011 Nobel Prize in Economics "for their empirical research on cause and effect in the macroeconomy"
- Oliver E. Williamson: 2009 Nobel Prize in Economics "for his analysis of economic governance, especially the boundaries of the firm"
- Edmund S. Phelps: 2006 Nobel Prize in Economics "for his analysis of intertemporal tradeoffs in macroeconomic policy"
- Edward C. Prescott: 2004 Nobel Prize in Economics "for his part in contributing to dynamic macroeconomics: the time consistency of economic policy and the driving forces behind business cycles"
- Lawrence Robert Klein: 1980 Nobel Prize in Economics "for the creation of economic models and their application to the analysis of economic fluctuations and economic policies"
- Simon Smith Kuznets: 1971 Nobel Prize in Economics "for his empirically founded interpretation of economic growth which has led to new and deepened insight into the economic and social structure and process of development"

== See also ==
- List of Wharton School alumni

== Bibliography ==
- Johnson, Rossiter, ed. (1906). The Biographical Dictionary of America. American Biographical Society.
