= Summer stock theater =

Summer-only stage productions

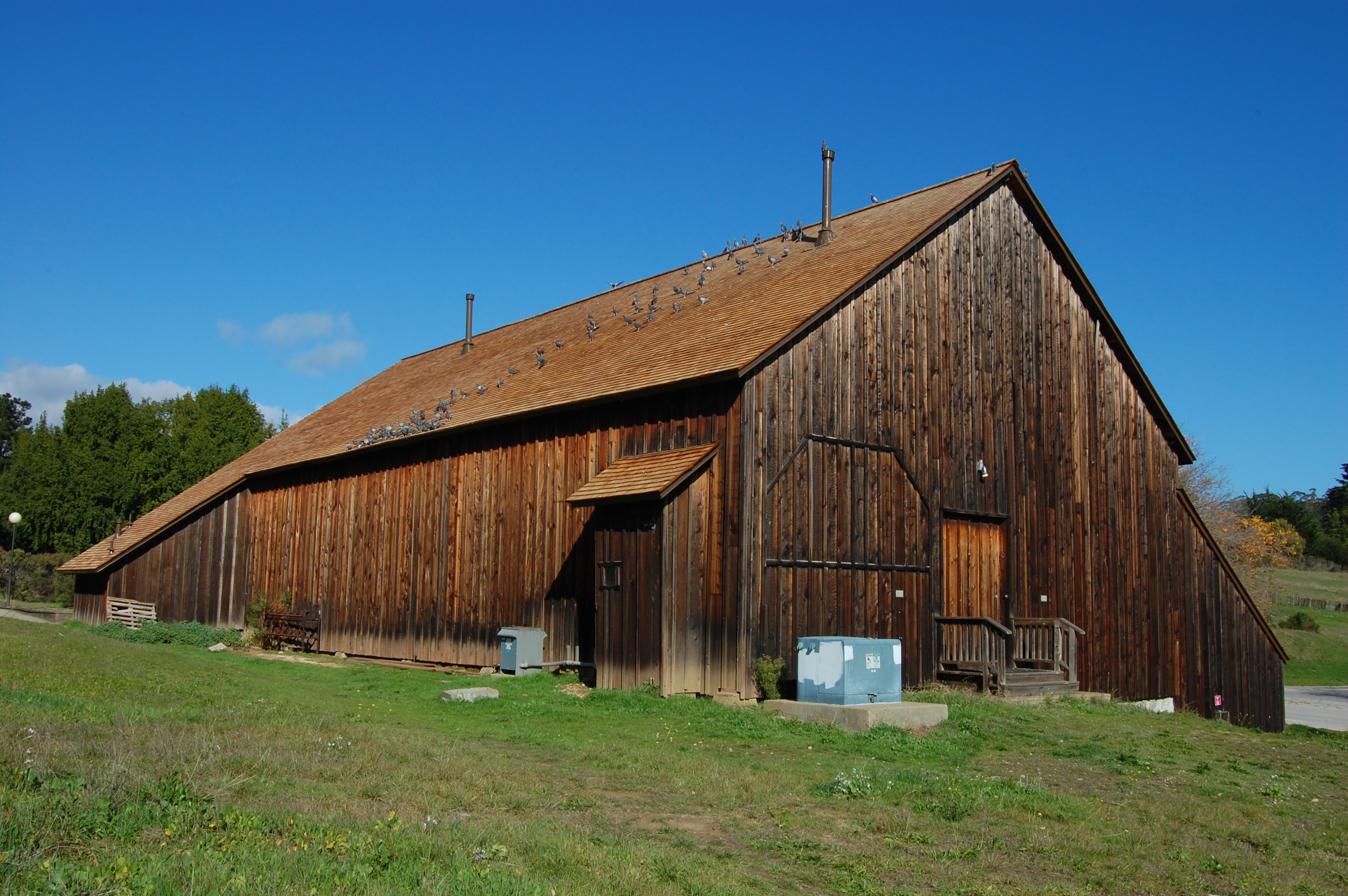
Barn Theatre of University of California, Santa Cruz

In American theater, summer stock theater is a theater that presents stage productions only in the summer. The name combines the season with the tradition of staging shows by a resident company, reusing stock scenery and costumes. Summer stock theaters frequently take advantage of seasonal weather by having their productions outdoors, under tents set up temporarily for their use, or in barns.

Some smaller theaters still continue this tradition, and a few summer stock theaters have become highly regarded by both patrons as well as performers and designers. Often viewed as a starting point for professional actors, stock casts are typically young, just out of high school or still in college.

== Elitch Theatre ==
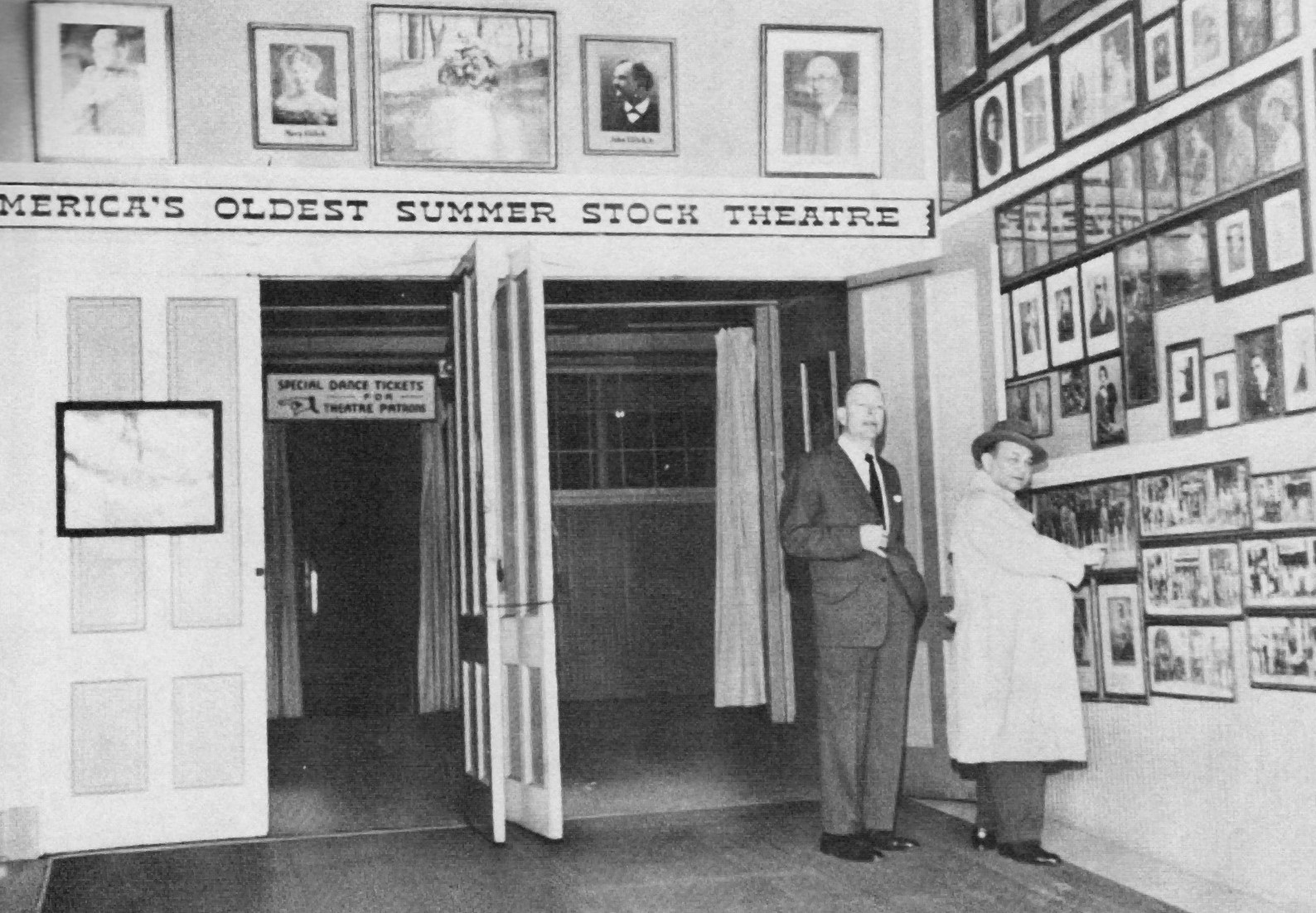
In 1958 Edward G. Robinson returned to the Historic Elitch Theatre where he had performed in the Summer Stock in 1921 & 1922.

Summer stock started in Denver, Colorado, at the Elitch Theatre (part of Elitch Gardens). A 1937 article in Time magazine reported: "Elitch's Gardens is the great-grandfather of all U. S. summer stock companies... and nearly every personage in U. S. show business, from General & Mrs. Tom Thumb to Douglas Fairbanks, has at one time or another played Elitch's."

According to the 1948 book Blueprint for Summer Theatre, "The first summer theater opened its doors at Elitch Gardens, Denver, Colorado on May 1, 1890. Plays were presented with a resident company and guest stars, a policy that has been followed with tremendous success for over fifty years."

Most sources consider 1893 to be the first year of summer stock. For that summer season, Elitch Gardens employed the Frank Norcross Company. It was the first full-length season of summer stock. The first stock play presented at Elitch Theatre was Nancy and Company by Augustin Daly. It opened on June 10, 1893. The company's roster of actors included: Lilian Dailey, Marion Earle, Alfred Hampton, Jane Kenmark, Hudson Liston, Millie Liston, Charles Lothian, Jeanette Lowrey, James F. Neill (who had organized the company), Frank E. Norcross, Bernard Reynold, and Weevie Vivian. The following year, James F. Neill and R.L. Giffen organized a company for the Manhattan Beach, Denver, with a cast list including: Anne Blancke, Kate Blancke, Alfred Burnham, Harry Corson Clarke, Henrietta Crosman, Josepha Crowell, Zula Hanes, William Ingersoll, John B. Maher, James F. Neill, and Mary Ryan as players, and with Alfred Fisher as stage director. In September 1894, Neill and Giffen also organized the first winter stock company at the Lyceum Theatre, Denver.

Another company was placed in Salt Lake City in December 1894 under the management of T. Daniel Frawley, who later purchased the Neill-Giffen interests and moved the organization to San Francisco. The roster of the combined Denver and Salt Lake City company included: Belle Archer, Blanche Bates, Robert E. Bell, H.D. Blakemore, Anne Blancke, Kate Blancke, Fanny Burt, Madge Carr Cook, Harry Corson Clarke, Jean Coyne, Henrietta Crosman, Charles Dade, Lilian Dailey, George W. Denham, Harry Gibbs, William Ingersoll, Jane Kenmark, Howard Kyle, George W. Leslie, Phosa McAllister, Cara Morlan, Robert Morris, James F. Neill, Phyllis Rankin, and Fred Trader, as players, with Walter Clark Bellow as stage director.

1896 was the second stock season and J. H. Huntley was signed to direct the resident stock company, headed by leading actress Jennie Kennark. The season opened with Rosedale, a play by Lester Wallack.

However, opinions differ on the official first year of summer stock. In a 1955 article for the Princeton University Library Chronicle, the authors suggest it was 1897:

Devotees of the straw hat circuit are usually under the impression that the summer theater movement originated when certain daft individuals began producing plays in barns. The true beginning was in the theater built by John and Mary Elitch on their ranch at Denver, Colorado, in 1891. After several seasons of vaudeville and light opera, the stock company inaugurated the 1897 season with its first dramatic performance. The director was George Edeson, with James O'Neill, father of dramatist Eugene O'Neill, as leading man. An unbroken series of successful seasons followed. This, then, is the oldest summer stock theater. In general, theatrical companies do not enjoy invariable successes, but widespread popularity has made summer theater a major industry, so that there is virtually no section of this country that does not boast at least one such dramatic group.

In his 1964 Ph.D. dissertation on stock theatre companies and James F. Neill (not to be confused with James O'Neill), William Zucchero wrote: "Denver could boast that It was the only city in the country that could and did support two summer stock companies:" He went on to quote an 1896 article stating:

The summer theatrical season Is now at its height and both Manhattan Beach and Elitch's Gardens are doing splendid business, and deservedly, too, for nowhere in the country are to be found better attractions or better Summer stock than those with which our local public is now being edified… The strength of these companies, as well as the plays presented, are way above the average.

Cecil B. DeMille, who acted in minor roles in the summer stock cast in 1905, would regularly send congratulatory telegrams to the theater on opening night. In 1926, more than two decades after his time at the theater, he sent a telegram stating: "It is a long time since I spent a very pleasant summer in stock at the Elitch Gardens. Today in Hollywood I can hardly go anywhere without meeting one or more now rather famous people who either during that summer or at other times played in what all actors and actresses consider one of the greatest cradles of the drama in American history."

== Later history ==
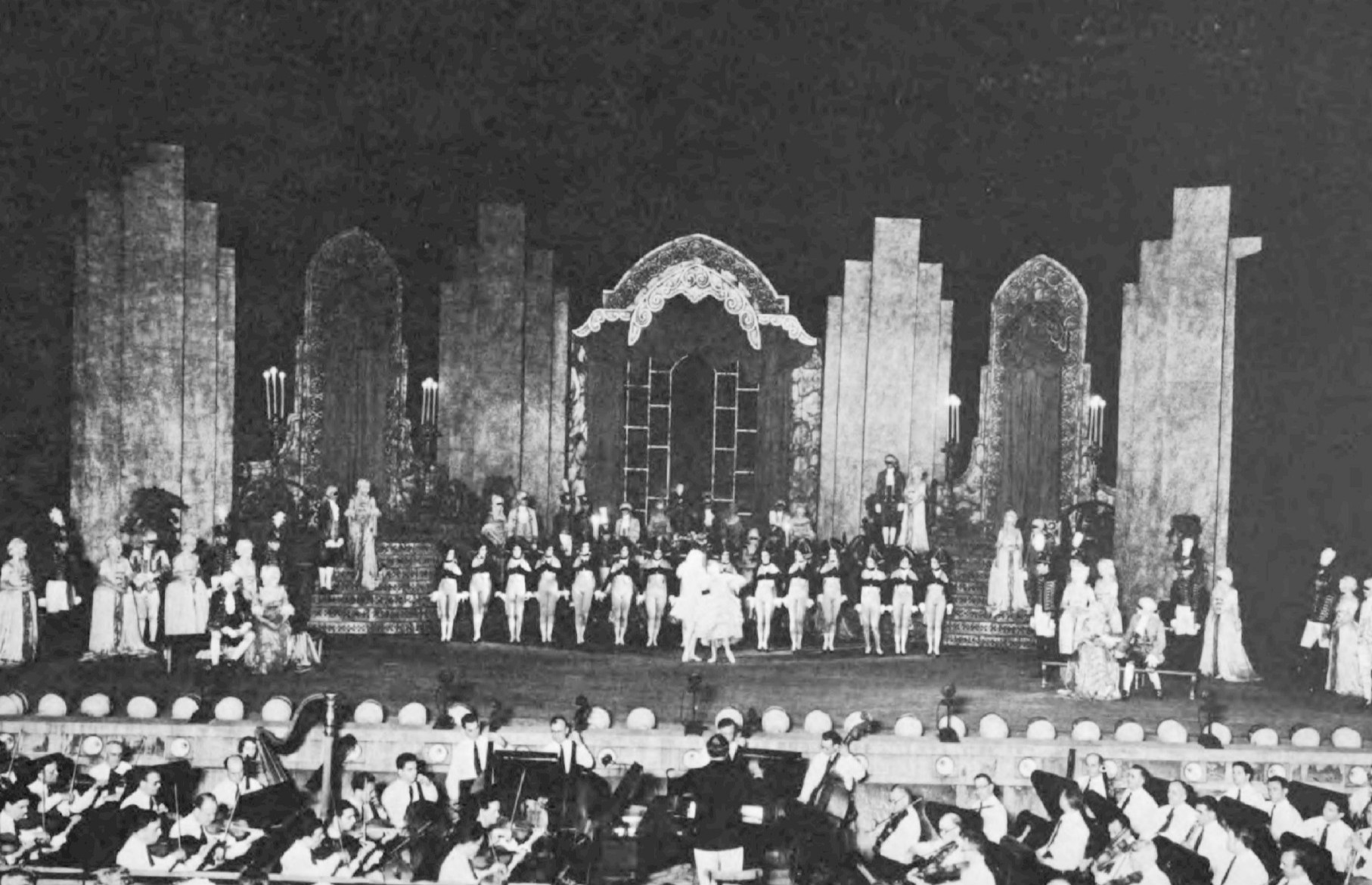
Stage of The Muny during a 1932 production

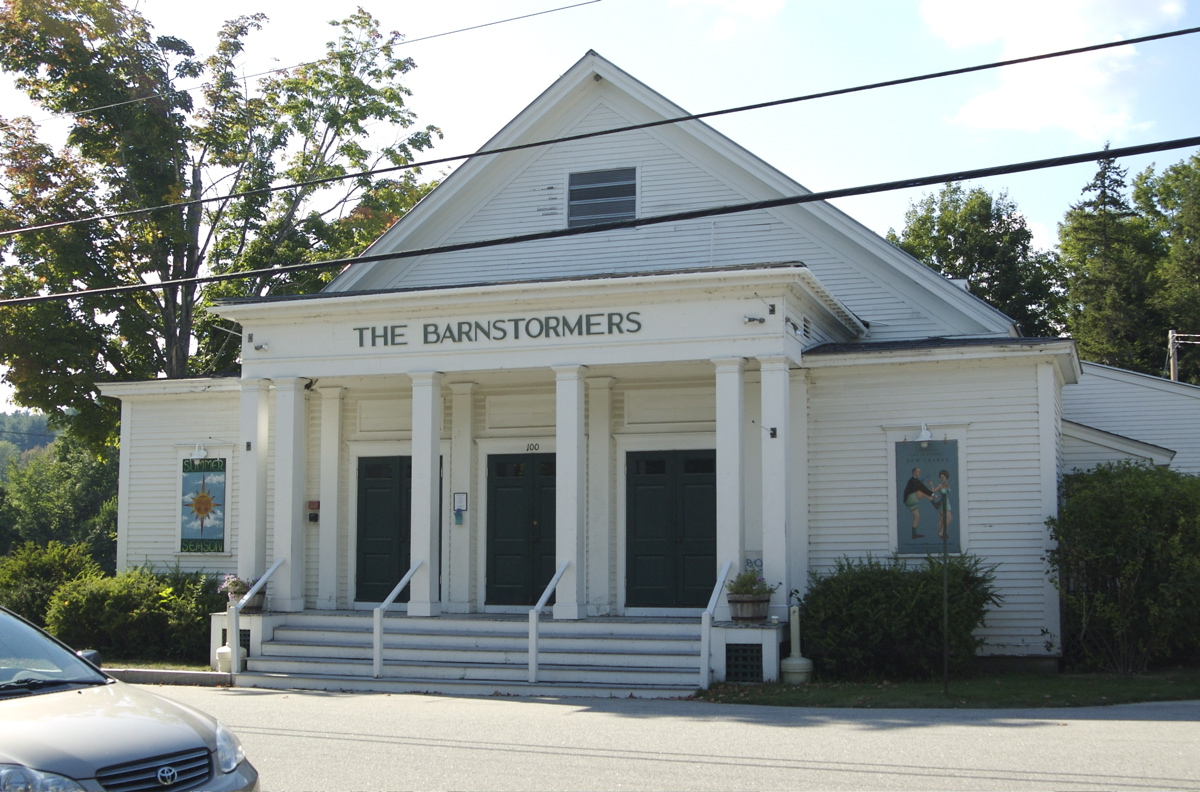
The Barnstormers Theatre building as seen in 2008

In the 1920s, summer stock expanded: The Muny, St. Louis, Missouri (1919) is the nation's oldest and largest outdoor musical theater; Manhattan Theatre Colony, first started near Peterborough, New Hampshire (1927) and moved to Ogunquit, Maine; Gretna Theatre of Mount Gretna, Pennsylvania (1927) as part of the Chautauqua movement; the Cape Playhouse in Dennis, Massachusetts (1927); the Berkshire Playhouse in Stockbridge, Massachusetts (1928); and The Barnstormers Theatre of Tamworth, New Hampshire (1931).

Many of the theaters of the heyday, the 1920s through the 1960s, were in New England. Part of the "straw hat circuit", theaters also were in New York, Pennsylvania, and Ohio, among other states. (Lakewood Playhouse near Skowhegan, Maine (1901 for summer), was an earlier theater, but it was an established stock theater that had then been used as a summer venue.)

The structure was to present different plays in weekly or biweekly repertory, performed by a resident company, generally between June and September. The usual fare consisted of light comedies, romances and mysteries. The theaters were located in rural areas. Touring companies would carry hand props and costumes to each venue, where sound, lights and set would be awaiting them.

Summer stock provided a training ground for actors and inexpensive entertainment for vacationing East Coast urbanites. Craig Mamrick describes Louis Edmonds' early summer stock experience: "Louis spent the summer of 1949 working as part of the repertory company at the Ogunquit Playhouse in Ogunquit, Maine... The Ogunquit Playhouse was affiliated with the Manhattan Theatre Colony, an apprentice program that hopeful actors could attend (paying $150 for the summer) to learn their craft and observe—and possibly work with—professionals. Such stage luminaries as Maude Adams, Ethel Barrymore, Lillian Gish, and Ruth Gordon had trod the boards here. Students took classes in acting, stagecraft, makeup, and voice, and if they were talented enough, they might be asked to appear in plays with the resident acting company." Additionally, many notable performers spent their summers on the circuit. Plays and musicals that had closed on Broadway would play the circuit.

By 1950, there were 152 Equity companies, including the Ogunquit Playhouse and Skowhegan Playhouse in Maine; the Woodstock Playhouse and the Forestburgh Playhouse in upstate New York; Falmouth Playhouse in Massachusetts (burned down in 1994); Priscilla Beach Theatre in Plymouth, Massachusetts, and the Bucks County Playhouse in New Hope (suburban Philadelphia), Pennsylvania (established in 1939). The Westport Country Playhouse in Connecticut, since renovated with the support of Joanne Woodward and Paul Newman, was also part of the summer stock circuit.

The circuit toured in Florida and the Southeast during the winter. Venues included the Beacham Theater in Orlando and the Royal Poinciana Playhouse in Palm Beach, Florida (closed since 2004) where performers from Bob Cummings in 1958 to Arlene Francis (1961) and Richard Chamberlain (1966) appeared.

== Performers ==
Stars of Broadway, film, and television would regularly spend summers performing in stock. The Council of Stock Theatres (COST) negotiated a special contract with Actors Equity to cover the work of actors and stage managers.

Summer Stock at the Historic Elitch Theatre in Denver was the proving-grounds for a number of would-be stars. For the 1905 season, a 20-something Cecil B. DeMille was a minor player in the stock cast. Denver-natives, such as Douglas Fairbanks, Maude Fealy, and Antoinette Perry, all got their start in summer stock at the Elitch Theatre. Additionally, Fredric March, Minnie Maddern Fiske, Beulah Bondi, Edward G. Robinson (see photo above), and Sylvia Sidney were all stock cast members at one time. In the summer of 1951, a young Grace Kelly (just 21-years old) was the ingénue for the stock company. While performing at the theater she received a telegram from Fred Zinnemann asking her to come to Hollywood to star in his film High Noon as Gary Cooper's wife. She initially thought she had to decline because of her contract that lasted through the end of the summer, but her director at the theater quickly reminded her that she only had to give two-weeks notice and she could head to Hollywood.

John Kenley, an Ohio-based producer, ran his own summer stock circuit, Kenley Players, in Columbus, Dayton, Warren, the Carousel Theatre in Akron, and Canton, Ohio, and sent many of the shows to an affiliated theater in Flint, Michigan. Starting in 1958 performers such as Dan Dailey in Guys and Dolls, Barbara Eden in Lady in the Dark, and Howard Keel in Kismet appeared. Kenley cast "movie stars and television personalities" who were nationally known. During Gypsy Rose Lee's engagement in Auntie Mame at the Warren theater, Erik Preminger wrote: "Working for him [John Kenley] was a joy. Everything about his operation was first-class from the director and supporting cast he had assembled through the scenery, props, and costumes...He was attentive, supportive." Performers such as Paul Lynde, Bill Bixby, Karen Morrow, Phyllis Diller, Andy Devine, Gordon MacRae and Patrice Munsel starred in Kenley stock productions. Ethel Merman performed in Call Me Madam at the Kenley Players in 1968 (as well as appearing at the Parker Playhouse and Coconut Grove Playhouse in Miami earlier that year).

The Cape Playhouse in Dennis, Massachusetts opened in 1927 with The Guardsman, starring Basil Rathbone, and has continued through the 2009 season with Hunter Foster and Malcolm Gets.

Gretna Theatre, opened in 1927 in the Pennsylvania Chautauqua community of Mount Gretna, and has hosted performers such as Bernadette Peters, Faith Prince, Tommy Tune, Kim Zimmer, Charlton Heston.

The Ogunquit Playhouse, begun in 1933, attracted performers such as Maude Adams, Ethel Barrymore, and Laurette Taylor in the early years and more recently, Sally Struthers, Lucie Arnaz, and Lorenzo Lamas.

Performers such as Ginger Rogers, Douglas Fairbanks Jr., Angela Lansbury, Bob Hope, Sergio Franchi, Zero Mostel, Ann Miller, Jane Powell, and Debbie Reynolds performed at the Cape Cod Music Circus and its sister theater, the South Shore Music Circus.

Colleen Dewhurst wrote of her experiences in summer stock as a new actress: "My first professional jobs were in summer stock, in small, medium and large companies that presented ten plays in ten weeks from June until Labor Day...At that time, the core of each summer stock company was made up of a stage manager and six resident actors: a leading man and woman, a character man and woman, and an ingenue and a juvenile. In some cases, five or six of the summer plays would be 'star vehicles', featuring a familiar actor or actress."

William Shatner performed in summer stock after the cancellation of Star Trek.

== Notable theaters ==
Some summer theaters specialize in a particular type of production, such as Shakespearean plays, musicals, or even opera. Some notable summer theaters include: the New York Shakespeare Festival (better-known as Shakespeare in the Park, although a number of other summer stock Shakespearean series use this name); the Gretna Theatre, Mount Gretna, Pennsylvania, Rocky Mountain Repertory Theatre, Grand Lake, Colorado, Summerstock Conservatory, Calgary Utah Shakespearean Festival, Cedar City, Utah, Santa Fe Opera, Jacob's Pillow Dance Festival, Becket, Massachusetts, Williamstown Theatre Festival, Williamstown, Massachusetts, Berkshire Theatre Festival, Stockbridge, Massachusetts, Glimmerglass Festival, Cooperstown, New York, Vancouver's Bard on the Beach, and the Tent Theatre (John Goodman Amphitheatre) in Springfield, Missouri.

The Historic Elitch Theatre is still standing today, and after several phases of restoration, the foundation running the theatre hopes to have regular productions again in the next few years.

== Circus tent theater ==
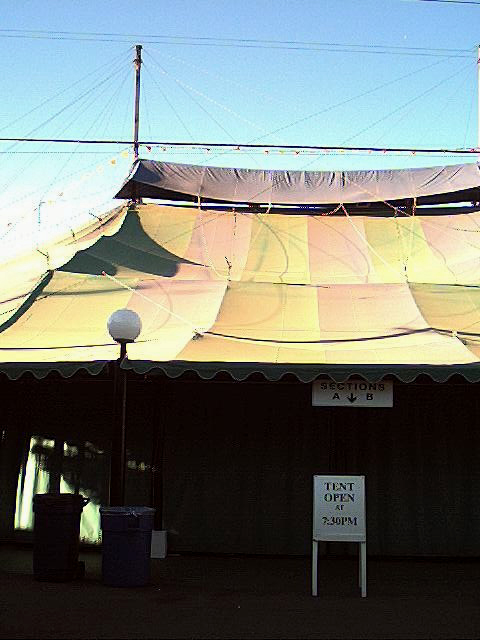
The Sacramento Music Circus tent in 2001

In 1949, St. John Terrell began a new experience presenting summer stock theater under an arena-type (circus) tent in Lambertville, New Jersey, the Music circus. This began a new period of outdoor theater. In 1951 this new style of summer stock made its way west with the addition of the Sacramento Music Circus.

The Cape Cod Music Circus (now the Melody Tent) in Hyannis, Massachusetts opened in 1950, the third tent theater to open, and The South Shore Music Circus in Cohasset, Massachusetts followed in 1951. A tent theater had opened earlier in Florida.

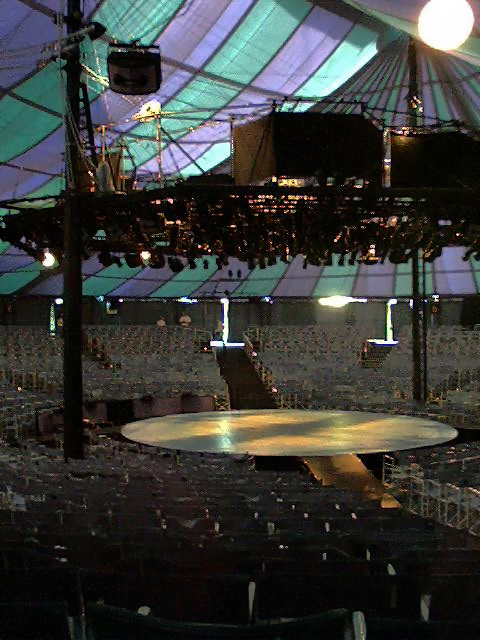
The Sacramento Music Circus stage in 2001

Another theater in the round, the Valley Forge Music Fair (which closed in 1996), in Devon, Pennsylvania, was opened in 1955 by Shelly Gross, Lee Guber and Frank Ford. They then opened other theaters in the round, including Shady Grove Music Fair in Washington, DC, Painters Mill Music Fair in Maryland (closed in 1991), and the Westbury Music Fair on Long Island, opened in 1956. By 1957, there were 19 tent theaters, many located in Massachusetts, New York, and New Jersey, and all presenting musicals only. (The musical The Pajama Game was the major show making the tent circuit in the summer of 1957.)

The theatre-in-the-round concept brought Broadway-style musicals to northern California under a big top tent each summer. Original producers Russell Lewis and Howard Young presented their first production, Show Boat, the same opening production at both the Lambertville and the South Shore Music Circus. The original Lambertville theater closed in 1970, and both the Sacramento and South Shore theaters continue to thrive today. In Sacramento, live musicals in the round are presented in a new permanent complex, The Wells Fargo Pavilion. The South Shore Music Circus and Cape Cod Melody Tent now serve primarily as intimate settings for musical acts including popular singers, oldies groups, and orchestras.

== See also ==
- Regional theatre in the United States
- Repertory
