= Devon Preparatory School =

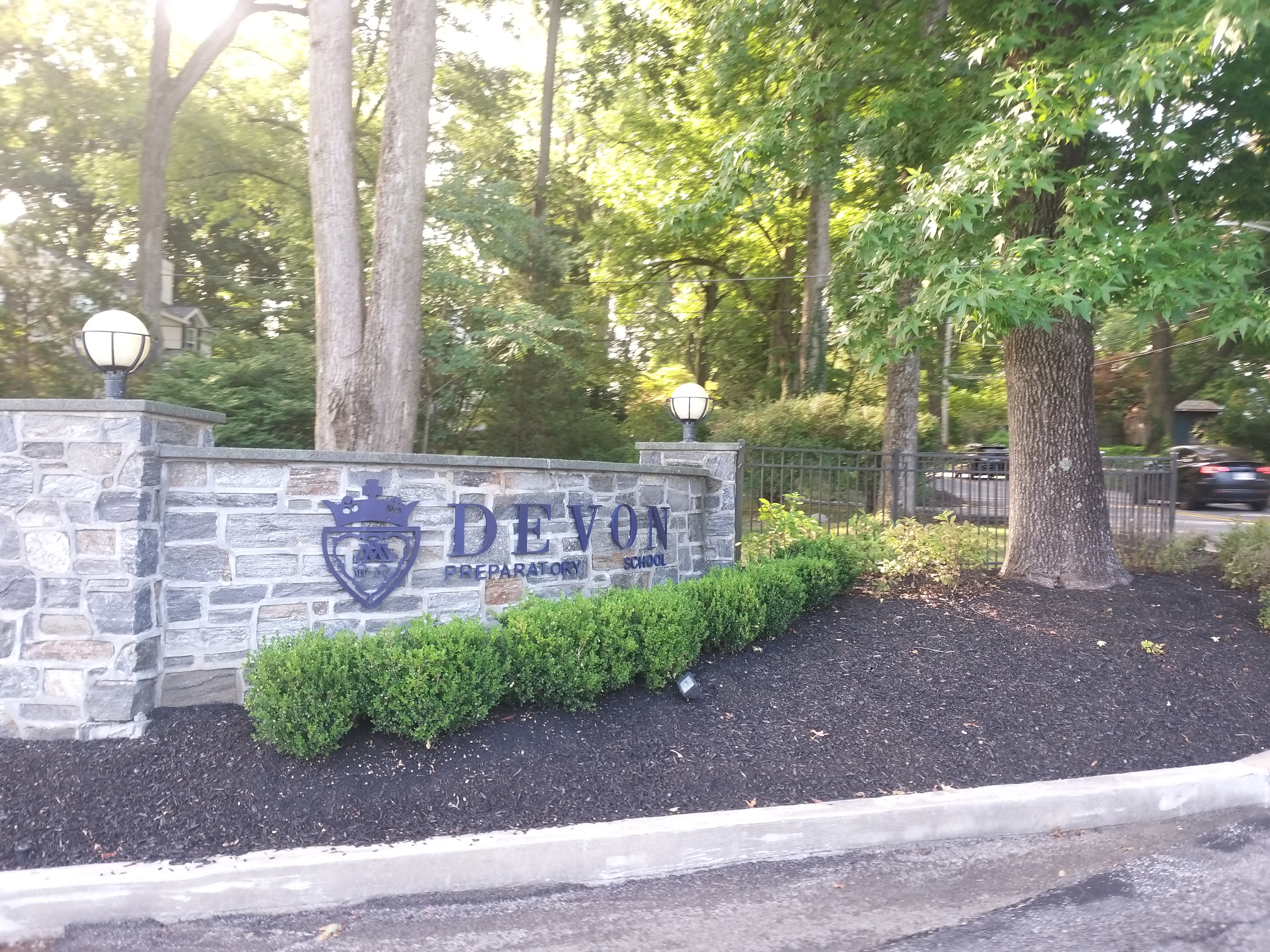

Location
- 363 North Valley Forge Road; Tredyffrin Township (Devon postal address), Chester County, Pennsylvania 19333-1299; United States; 40°3′19″N 75°25′16″W

Information
- School type: Independent Catholic College-preparatory school
- Motto: Education for Life
- Religious affiliation: Roman Catholic
- Denomination: Piarist
- Established: 1956
- Status: Open
- Local authority: Roman Catholic Archdiocese of Philadelphia
- CEEB code: 391005
- NCES School ID: 01184834
- Headmaster: Nelson Henao
- Faculty: 55.9 (on an FTE basis)
- Grades: 6–12
- Gender: All-male
- Enrollment: 333 (2023–2024)
  - Grade 6: 17
  - Grade 7: 26
  - Grade 8: 35
  - Grade 9: 66
  - Grade 10: 63
  - Grade 11: 67
  - Grade 12: 59
- Average class size: 12
- Student to teacher ratio: 6.0
- Hours in school day: 6.7
- Campus size: 20 acres (8.1 ha)
- Campus type: Suburban
- Colors: Blue and gold
- Athletics conference: Philadelphia Catholic League
- Sports: Baseball, Basketball, Bowling, Cross Country, Golf, Ice hockey, Lacrosse, Soccer, Tennis, Track and field, Wrestling
- Nickname: Tide
- Accreditation: MSA
- SAT average: 1320
- Publication: Devon Prep Tidings
- Newspaper: The Devon Dialogue
- Yearbook: The Calasanctian
- Annual tuition: $32,050 (Upper School) $29,050 (Middle School)
- Website: www.devonprep.com

Devon Preparatory School is a Catholic all-male college preparatory school in Tredyffrin Township, Pennsylvania, in the United States, with a Devon postal address. Founded in 1956 by Piarists, it is divided into a middle school (grades 6–8) and an upper school (grades 9–12), both located on the same 20 acres (8.1 ha) campus. The school operates independently under the auspices of the Roman Catholic Archdiocese of Philadelphia.

== History ==
The Devon Preparatory School site was originally owned by Thomas F. Wright in the 1890s, and later sold to Philadelphia publisher, art collector, and socialite Charles Matthew Lea. Lea, son of historian Henry Charles Lea, inherited his fortune from the Lea & Febiger publishing firm, the oldest publishing company in the United States (1785–1990). The firm's best-known title was the American edition of Gray's Anatomy, which they began publishing in 1859. In 1920, the Lea Family expanded the original 20 acres (8.1 ha) tract on the east side of Valley Forge Road by purchasing an additional 83 acres (34 ha). This consolidated property was known as Westthorpe Farm.

The main entrance to Westthorpe Farm was at the intersection of Conestoga Road, Valley Forge Road, and Hunters Lane, where large stone pillars still stand. Several stone pillars that initially formed a southern fence line remain partially in place along West Conestoga and Upper Gulph Roads. The current entrance to Devon Preparatory School, on Valley Forge Road, was the service entrance to the mansion. An outbuilding from Westthorpe Farm still stands northeast of the intersection of Upper Gulph and Hunters Lane.

The 25-room Westthorpe mansion, designed by Brockie & Hastings, was the home of Charles M. Lea until he died in 1927. His widow, Charlotte Augusta Lea, remained at the mansion until she died in 1945.

The property was then sold to Alexander Shand, a developer who built one of the first post-World War II home developments, known as the Shand Tract, on Steeplechase Road and Hunters Lane. Shand sold the mansion to Joseph Lerner, who had hoped to make it a psychiatric hospital. Because of neighborhood opposition to his project, Lerner sold the property to the Piarist Fathers in 1955.

In 1994, Father James J. Shea became the school's headmaster. He retired on July 31, 2015. In August 2023, the school announced that Father Francisco Aisa would be stepping down as headmaster to return to his home country of Spain. The current headmaster is Father Nelson Henao.

== Admissions ==
=== Demographics ===
Enrollment by Race/Ethnicity 2023–2024
White	Asian	Black	Hispanic	American/Alaskan Native
278	26	19	9	1

== Programs ==
Previously, the school had a boarding program. This ended in 1970.

== Campus ==
The campus is in Tredyffrin Township, Pennsylvania. It is adjacent to, but not inside, the Devon census-designated place. Prior to 2010, Devon was in the Devon-Berwyn CDP.

== Extracurricular activities ==
=== Athletics ===
Devon Prep's athletic teams compete in the Philadelphia Catholic League (12 teams).

- Fall: Cross Country, Soccer (Varsity, Junior Varsity, and Freshmen), Golf (Varsity and Junior Varsity), and Crew.
- Winter: Basketball (Varsity, Junior Varsity, and Freshmen), Indoor Track, Bowling, Squash, Ice Hockey, and Swimming.
- Spring: Baseball (Varsity and Junior Varsity), Lacrosse, Track and Field, Tennis, and Crew.

==== PIAA Championships ====
Devon Prep has won multiple championships, which include the following:

- Golf:
  - 2023 PIAA 2A GOLF
  - 2022 PIAA 2A INDIVIDUAL GOLF
  - 2021 PIAA 2A GOLF
- Basketball:
  - 2022 PIAA 3A BASKETBALL
  - 2024 PIAA 3A BASKETBALL
  - 2025 PIAA 4A BASKETBALL
  - 2026 PIAA 4A BASKETBALL
- Baseball:
  - 2014 PIAA 1A BASEBALL
  - 2019 PIAA 2A BASEBALL
- Tennis:
  - 2021 2A PIAA DOUBLES

=== Clubs and activities ===
Devon Prep has over 50 different extracurricular activity groups. Some of them include: Mock Trial, Model United Nations, DECA, Film Club, Devon Dialogue (newspaper), Calasanctian (yearbook), Art Club, and many more. There is an elected Student Council, honor societies, and an Academic Competition Team. Musical groups for students include Jazz Band, Rock Band, Choral Tide, and Middle School Ensemble. There are annual Fall Drama and Spring Musical performances.

==== Devon Prep Esports ====
The Esports team at Devon Prep, founded in 2023, has won multiple Splatoon 3 championships, including the 2024 HSEL Winter Blitz, 2024 HSEL Spring Major, 2024 HSEL Fall Major, and 2024 PlayVS Mid-Atlantic Championship. The team was one of five finalists (from over 11,000 eligible teams) for the 2025 PlayVS Esports Team of the Year award after a 26-match winning streak from 24 September 2024 to 18 March 2025. In addition to championships, the program has produced one Coca-Cola All Star for VALORANT (2024) and alumni have attended the University of Notre Dame, Duke University, Northeastern University and more. The team has also run an esports charity event called "Play With Purpose" in collaboration with local all-girls Catholic school Villa Maria Academy, playing in-person at Uplink Studios in King of Prussia and raising over $1,700 from over 200 donors for Extra Life and the Children's Hospital of Philadelphia in 2026.

==== Summer enrichment program ====
In the summer, Devon Prep hosts a Summer Enrichment Program. Students participate in sports and dramatic arts camps, as well as various other courses, throughout the two sessions. They attend classes including algebra readiness, digital photography, painting and sculpting, video production, study skills, web building, and history explorations. The sports camps include baseball, soccer, track, golf, and basketball.

== Notable alumni ==
- Keith Dunleavy, MD ('87), physician, entrepreneur, and philanthropist; founder and former CEO of Inovalon; director of Dunleavy Foundation; and board member at Harvard Medical School and Dartmouth College
- Raymond Geuss, philosopher, professor at Cambridge University
- Mark Malseed, co-author, The Google Story and a named collaborator, with author Bob Woodward, on the #1 New York Times non-fiction bestsellers Plan of Attack and Bush at War.
- Francis X. Diebold ('77), American economist and professor at the University of Pennsylvania, one of the most cited economists in the world.
- Daniel L. Shields ('80), former American Ambassador, served at United States embassies in the Philippines, Japan, China, Singapore and Brunei

== See also ==
- Piarists
- St. Joseph Calasanz – founder of the Pious Schools and the Order of the Piarists
- List of high schools in Pennsylvania
