= Bring Back Birdie =

1981 Broadway musical

- Original cast album
- Music: Charles Strouse
- Lyrics: Lee Adams
- Book: Michael Stewart
- Basis: Sequel to Bye Bye Birdie
- Productions: 1981 Broadway

Bring Back Birdie is a 1981 musical with music by Charles Strouse, lyrics by Lee Adams, and a book by Michael Stewart. It is a sequel to the 1960 musical Bye Bye Birdie, which was written by the same team.

Taking place twenty years after Bye Bye Birdie, it focuses on a scheme for rock 'n' roller Conrad Birdie, who had disappeared after being discharged from the U. S. Army, to make a comeback on a Grammy Awards broadcast.

== Background ==
In 1980, according to Charles Strouse, Bye Bye Birdie was "still the most produced musical in America and a top moneymaker for the company [Tams-Witmark] that licensed the amateur rights[.]" The idea of a sequel originated with Tams-Witmark; the writers agreed, under the plan that it would only be available for amateur licensing. However, when Broadway producers Lee Guber and Shelly Gross read the sequel's script, they decided to produce it for Broadway. During Broadway previews, two songs, "Shape Up" and "Don't Say F-A-T in Front of Conrad", were cut.

== Synopsis ==
=== Act 1 ===
A story teller begins: "Once upon a time, so long ago that New York City hadn't even been bankrupt once, there lived a young man in the music business named Albert Peterson, who loved his secretary, Rose. His only client, a rock-n-roll idol known as Conrad Birdie, was being drafted into the army, and Rose wanted Albert to give up the music business, marry her, and become...an English teacher! Alas, Albert's mother--a frail and gentle old lady with many of the same endearing qualities as Snow White's stepmother--opposed the match. But love triumphed, Conrad vanished, the mother was banished, Albert married his Rose and became an English teacher and they all lived happily ever after. (Ominous chord.) Till now."

Albert and Rose are burglarizing their old office, looking for the contract that will put them on the trail of Conrad Birdie. Birdie disappeared 18 years ago, and Albert has been offered $20,000 if he can get him to perform on a TV Grammy Award special, along with other giant recording stars of yesterday. Albert is eager to return to the music business, but Rose is unhappy about it ("Twenty Happy Years"). Albert is almost convinced to give up. Then Mtobe, the fly-by-night detective appears, and to Rose's disgust finds the old contract. Albert notes that Birdie is at the El Coyote Club, Bent River Junction, Arizona, and tells Rosie that they will head for Arizona immediately.

In Forest Hills, Jenny, the Petersons' 16-year-old daughter, has her own plan for leaving home ("Movin' Out" and "Half of a Couple".) Albert Jr., 14, is a budding guitarist. Rose is in the kitchen, contentedly doing her housewifely chores laden with boxes of "Cheer," "Joy," and "Yes" ("I Like What I Do").

Rose reluctantly agrees to help Albert find Conrad, but for ten days, and tells the children that they will stay in New Jersey while they are away.

In the bus terminal Albert has arranged "a spontaneous demonstration by the youth of America demanding the return of Conrad Birdie." Mtobe, who will do anything for a fee, appears to sing "Bring Back Birdie", the song Albert has written for the occasion. Rose and Albert board their bus to Tucson, believing that Jenny and Albert Jr. are on their bus to Cousin Alice's. Instead, Jenny, angry that her mother has vetoed her plan to live with her boyfriend, is intrigued by a saffron-robed lady, who says, "Come march with the Reverend Sun, sister, and find fulfillment." Jenny does. And her brother joins a punk rock band and takes off to fulfill his destiny.

In the black desert rear Bent River Junction, Arizona, while Rose struggles with their luggage, Albert assures her ("Baby, You Can Count on Me").

They find the El Coyote Club, a noisy Western saloon, site of Conrad's last gig, and the bartender turns out to be Mae Peterson, Albert's long-lost mother, who, true to form, insults Rose at every opportunity. Mae seems to know something about Conrad's whereabouts, so Albert leaves with her to consult "her files." Rose has a drink with the resident cowboys and explains why she puts up with Albert in "A Man Worth Fightin' For". After Rose does a rousing dance with the boys, Albert returns to report that Mayor C. B. Townsend might be able to help in the search.

The Mayor, a dignified, paunchy Western politician can't recall Mr. Birdie. He is sorry to cut the interview short, but he must meet with the Citizen's Committee to draft him for the Senate. As Albert and Rose turn to leave, the Mayor burps. Albert rushes back into the office. It is revealed that Conrad is the Mayor as he sings "You Can Never Go Back".

Albert manages to convince Conrad to try a comeback. They book him to appear at a rock concert the following night at University Stadium, and manage to cram the corpulent Conrad into the old gold suit and shove him on-stage, where he begins one of his old numbers. But the 1981 kids boo him off the stage - they've come to hear the new punk rock group Filth and don't want a 1962 retread like Birdie. Conrad, hurt, runs out.

Meanwhile, Rose has learned that her children are not at Cousin Alice's and is worried. Her concern deepens when she discovers that, disguised in pink hair and dark glasses, the guitarist for Filth is none other than Albert Jr.! Grabbing her son and interrupting the concert, Rose angrily tells Albert she's going to find Jenny, "who's gone off ringing bells somewhere," reunite the family, and go home. Albert, delighted to be back in show biz, scarcely hears her, and blithely ignores threats of million-dollar lawsuits from the concert manager and an NBC executive who is counting on Conrad for the Grammy show. Albert explains his euphoria in "Back in Show Biz Again". The first act ends with Albert in deep trouble and without Rose to help get him out of it.

=== Act 2 ===
Albert suddenly realizes the mess he's in: he's signed a contract to deliver Conrad, who has run away, he's being sued right and left ("Middle Age Blues").

Mae appears with a tall, beautiful young woman, "I need Rose," Albert wails. "She's the only one who can help me." "Call me Rose Number Two," says the young woman, who is a combination of lawyer, financial expert, and Wonder Woman. She quickly disperses Albert's adversaries with legal skill, fast talk, and karate. Albert, rationalizing that, after all, Rose has left him, starts to fall for Rose Two.

At the compound of Reverend Sun a group of spaced-out acolytes chant and sing "Inner Peace". Rose has infiltrated their midst to rescue Jenny, and by dancing them into a frenzy manages to grab Jenny and escape.

Back in Bent River Junction, Rose Two has faked the death of Conrad to evade NBC's wrath. She fends off skeptical reporters. The "dead" Conrad sits up, drinks a beer, says he's decided to announce his passing was a mistake. But first, he's going to observe his own funeral pageant. Rose Two prevents this by locking Conrad in a closet, and we hear the Tucson Tabernacle Choir, led by Mtobe, in "There's a Brand New Beat in Heaven".

Rose returns with Jenny to find Albert completely smitten with the gorgeous and efficient Rose Two. He tells his astonished wife he's trading her in for the newer model. Instead of falling apart, Rose shows her mettle by singing and dancing the defiant "Well, I'm Not!".

Albert Jr., Jenny and their young friends comment on the craziness of their elders ("When Will Grown-Ups Grow Up?"). Albert hears this and realizes he's made a mistake. Rushing to the motel where Mae and Rose are staying, he finally stands up to his mother and demands to see Rose. "I was a jackass to ever waste my time with that other Rose, when there's only one Rose in the world I love, worship and adore," he tells her. "Just help me get Conrad through the Grammy Show and it's back to Forest Hills forever." Rose accepts. They kiss. "Rose," he yells, "I'm a tiger again!" Albert sings and dances "Young".

At the TV studio, near airtime, Conrad announces he's not going to appear. It seems that after his "funeral" he called a press conference to announce his recovery and millions of letters poured in. "The Citizens Committee decided not to nominate me for the Senate. They're gonna let me run for President instead! And it wouldn't be proper for the next President to shake it up on TV!" Consternation ensues. The NBC executive demands that Conrad Birdie "or a reasonable facsimile" be on that stage in 20 minutes or else. But no old record stars are available. Mae appears. "Would you take Delores Zepol?" she asks. "Zepol!", says Mr NBC, "the toast of the Twenties? Sure I'd take her, but she disappeared fifty years ago." Mae coyly says, "She's back." A shocked Albert says, "Mamma -- you, in show biz?" "Only until I married your father, sonny boy."

And Mae steps in and saves the Grammy show with her singing and dancing rendition of her 1925 hit, "I Love 'Em All". Albert gets his twenty thousand dollars. One surprise remains. "Zepol," muses Rose, "Unusual name." "Hungarian, I think," replies Mae. "Spelled backwards-Lopez!", says Rose. "Mae, you're - Spanish!" Mae, trapped, admits it. She embraces a very reluctant Rose as Conrad rushes on. "Albert, I couldn't let you down, old buddy! It means giving up the Presidency, but if the country can take it, so can I!"

Conrad appears on the show ("Bring Back Birdie") while Rose and Albert sing "Twenty Happy Years", followed by "Rosie", the same song that brought down the curtain twenty years ago on Bye Bye Birdie.

== Original cast and characters ==
Character	Broadway (1981)
Albert Peterson	Donald O'Connor
Rosie Alvarez	Chita Rivera
Mae Peterson	Maria Karnilova
Mtobe	Maurice Hines
Rosie II	Lynnda Ferguson
C.B. Townsend	Marcel Forestieri
Jenny	Robin Morse
Albert Jr.	Evan Seplow
Gary	Jeb Brown
Sunnie	Betsy Friday
Effie	Zoya Leporska

== Songs ==
Act 1

- "Twenty Happy Years" – Rose and Albert
- "Movin' Out" – Jenny, Gary and Kids
- "Half of a Couple" – Jenny and Girlfriends
- "I Like What I Do" – Rose
- "Bring Back Birdie" – Mtobe and Company
- "Movin' Out (Reprise)" – Kids
- "Baby, You Can Count On Me" – Albert
- "A Man Worth Fightin' For" – Rose and Cowboys
- "You Can Never Go Back" – Mayor Townsend
- "Filth" – Filth
- "Back in Show Biz Again" – Albert

Act 2

- "Middle Age Blues" – Albert
- "Inner Peace" – Rose, Reverend Sun and Sunnies
- "There's A Brand-New Beat in Heaven" – Mtobe and the Tucson Tabernacle Choir
- "Twenty Happy Years (Reprise)" – Albert
- "Well, I'm Not" – Rose
- "When Will Grown-ups Grow Up" – Kids
- "Middle Age Blues (Reprise)" – Albert
- "Young" – Albert
- "Show Girls" – Zepol Sisters and Stage Door Johnnies
- "Bring Back Birdie (Reprise)" – Conrad and the Birdettes
- "Twenty Happy Years (Reprise)" – Albert and Rose

An original cast album was released on the Original Cast label as an LP and subsequently re-issued on CD by Varèse Sarabande.

== Production history ==
Bring Back Birdie opened on Broadway on March 5, 1981 at the Martin Beck Theatre and closed on March 7, 1981 after 4 performances and 31 previews. Directed (and with original conception) by Joe Layton, the set design was by David Mitchell, costume design by Fred Voelpel, lighting design by David Hays, choreography by Frank O'Dowd, musical direction by Mark Hummel, and principal orchestrations by Ralph Burns.

Rivera was nominated for a Tony Award for Best Actress in a Musical and a Drama Desk Award as Outstanding Actress in a Musical.

== Response ==
In his review for The New York Times, Frank Rich wrote that the musical was "depressing" and "tired", while praising Chita Rivera: "far more effective" and noting that the score had "a few sprightly melodies."

In his book Not Since Carrie: Forty Years of Broadway Musical Flops, theater historian Ken Mandelbaum wrote that the show "may rank as the worst Broadway musical ever to be created by top-level professionals," with, among other things, a "tasteless and ridiculous" book and a score that contained "grotesque gospel and punk numbers" and "retreads of songs from the original [Bye Bye Birdie]." Similarly, theater historian Ethan Mordden described it as "the worst musical ever written by people you'd heard of", writing that its book "recalled the excesses of brainless twenties musicals", and that "very little" of the score was "even slightly listenable."
