= Mark Malseed =

Mark Malseed is an author, information industry consultant and investigative reporter. Malseed graduated from Devon Preparatory School in suburban Philadelphia in 1993 and from Lehigh University in 1997 where he majored in architecture and urban studies. After graduation, Malseed continued to volunteer at Lehigh, via the Young Alumni Council, promoting alumni education and networking. After Lehigh University, he also studied at the DIS – Danish Institute for Study Abroad in Copenhagen.

Along with David A. Vise, he coauthored The Google Story, a national bestseller published in over 25 languages. Prior to that, Malseed did research and reporting on government, intelligence and national security, including three years as the lead researcher for Bob Woodward. He was a named collaborator on the #1 New York Times non-fiction bestsellers Plan of Attack and Bush at War, as well as numerous front-page stories in The Washington Post. He also collaborated on the 2001 nonfiction bestseller The Bureau and the Mole about FBI spy Robert Hanssen.

He has appeared on the BBC, ABC, FOX, NPR, CBS, Bloomberg TV, Al Jazeera, and elsewhere, speaking about the information industry, and has also lectured at universities across the U.S. and abroad.

== Works cited ==
- Vise, David A., and Mark Malseed. The Google Story. Paperback ed. Dell Pub., 2006.
