= Noah Shachtman =

American journalist (born 1977)

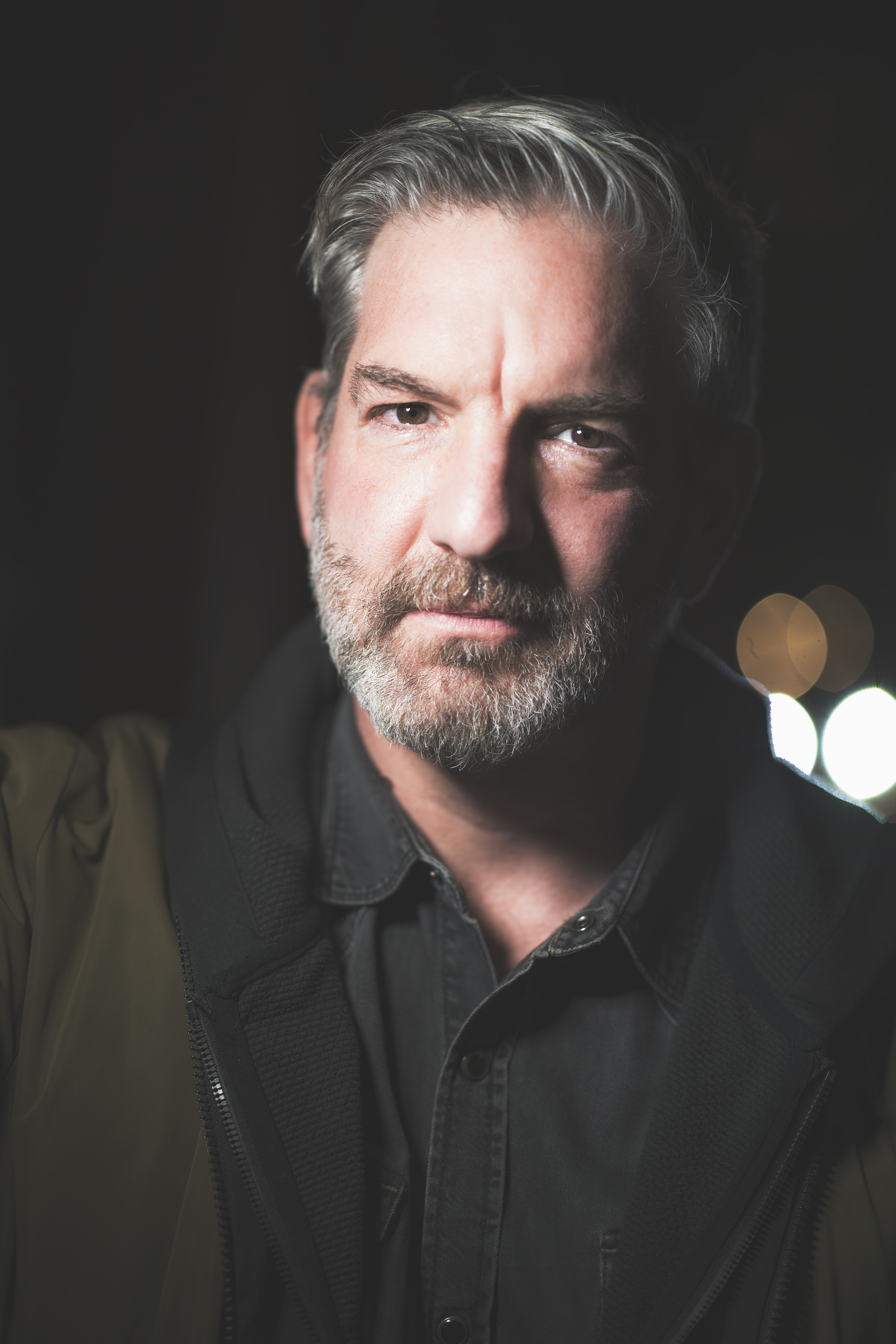
- Shachtman in 2022
- Education: Georgetown University (BA); Hebrew University of Jerusalem
- Occupation: Journalist
- Title: Editor-in-chief of Rolling Stone
- Relatives: Lee Guber (grandfather)
- Awards: Online Journalism Awards for Beat Reporting (2007) and National Magazine Award for Reporting, Digital Media (2012) and Best Digital Design (2023)

Noah Shachtman (born September 15, 1970) is an American journalist. From 2021 to 2024, he was the editor-in-chief of Rolling Stone. From 2018 to 2021, he was the editor-in-chief of The Daily Beast. He previously was the executive editor of the site. A former non-resident fellow at the Brookings Institution, he also worked as executive editor for News at Foreign Policy and as a contributing editor at Wired.

== Early life and education ==
Born to a Jewish family, Shachtman graduated from Georgetown University and attended the Hebrew University of Jerusalem. His grandfather was theater impresario Lee Guber, his step-grandmother was broadcast journalist Barbara Walters, and his father and stepmother worked at CBS News.

== Career ==
Shachtman was a staffer on the Bill Clinton 1992 presidential campaign. He played bass in a number of ska and reggae bands, in venues such as CBGB and the 9:30 Club. He started working in journalism as a way to make money between gigs.

In 2003, Shachtman founded Defensetech.org. The site was acquired by Military.com the following year. In 2006, he became a contributing editor at Wired. He co-founded the Danger Room blog, focused on national security, which won the 2007 Online Journalism Award for Beat Reporting and the 2012 National Magazine Award for reporting in digital media. Shachtman joined The Brookings Institution in 2013 as a non-resident fellow in its Center for 21st Century Security and Intelligence in 2013.

Shachtman left Wired to join Foreign Policy in 2013. He joined The Daily Beast as its new executive editor in 2014. Noted journalism school and research organization, the Poynter Institute, would later say Shachtman helped turned the Daily Beast into "a journalistic scoop factory."

When John Avlon left The Daily Beast in May 2018, Shachtman was promoted to editor-in-chief. The Hollywood Reporter named Shachtman one of the 35 most powerful people in New York media in 2019.

Shachtman has contributed to The New York Times Magazine, The Wall Street Journal, The Washington Post, Slate, and the Bulletin of the Atomic Scientists. He has also appeared as a guest on CNN, NPR, MSNBC, and Frontline. Shachtman has spoken before audiences at West Point, the Army Command and General Staff College, the Aspen Security Forum, the O’Reilly Emerging Technology Conference, Harvard Law School, Yale Law School, National Defense University and the Center for a New American Security Conference.

Shachtman has reported from Afghanistan, Israel, Iraq, Qatar, Kuwait, Russia, the Pentagon, and the Los Alamos National Laboratory. Prior to his career in journalism, Shachtman was a campaign staffer in the Bill Clinton 1992 presidential campaign, a book editor, and plays bass guitar. Shachtman continues to work as a contributing writer for Rolling Stone and the New York Times.

=== Rolling Stone ===
Shachtman was named editor-in-chief of Rolling Stone in July 2021.

In October 2022, Rolling Stone broke the news that the FBI had raided the home of ABC News producer James Gordon Meek, but left out the detail that the raid was carried out because of child pornography, instead suggesting that "Meek appears to be on the wrong side of the national-security apparatus" and that the raid had been instigated by the government because of Meek's reporting on national security issues. It was later revealed that the article was originally to include the child pornography details, but Shachtman, who personally knows the accused Meek and is considered friendly with him, had personally intervened to remove the charges and rewrote the article to give it a different spin.

In February 2024, Shachtman announced he would be stepping down as Rolling Stone's editor-in-chief. During his tenure, the magazine won a National Magazine Award and was nominated for an Emmy Award

== Personal life ==
Shachtman lives in Brooklyn with his wife and two children.

== Selected works ==
New York Times - Dead Athletes. Empty Stands. Why Are We Paying Billions to Keep This Sport Alive?

Intelligencer - Inside the Crisis at the Anti-Defamation League

Rolling Stone - Trump’s White House Was ‘Awash in Speed’ — and Xanax

Wired - The Secret History of Iraq’s Invisible War

Wired - They Cracked This 250-Year-Old Code, and Found a Secret Society Inside
