= Theatre at Westbury =

Entertainment venue in the hamlet of Jericho, outside of Westbury, New York

Coordinates: 40°46′24″N 73°33′30″W

Flagstar at Westbury Music Fair
- Interactive map of Flagstar at Westbury Music Fair
- Former names: Westbury Music Fair (1956-2005); North Fork Theatre in Westbury (2005-08); Capital One Bank Theatre at Westbury (2008-09); Theatre at Westbury (2009-10); NYCB Theatre at Westbury (2010-18); NYCB at Westbury Theatre (2018-24)
- Address: 960 Brush Hollow Rd; Westbury, NY 11590-1733
- Owner: Live Nation Entertainment
- Capacity: 1,800 (1956-66); 2,870 (1966-present)
- Type: In the round

Construction
- Opened: June 18, 1956
- Renovated: 1965, 1992
- Cost: $120,000 ($1.44 million in 2025 dollars)

Website
- Official website

The Flagstar at Westbury Music Fair (originally known as the Westbury Music Fair) is an entertainment venue located in the hamlet of Jericho, outside of Westbury, New York. It was constructed as a theatre in the round, with seating for 2,870. It was one of many similar venues, was originally developed by Shelly Gross and Lee Guber as a means to present top performers and productions of popular theatrical musicals at a series of venues located in suburban locations on the East Coast of the United States.

== History ==
In 1954, radio broadcaster Frank Ford and nightclub owner Lee Guber were returning home with their wives after attending a 1954 musical performance presented in a tent. After the two commented on how they could improve the show they had just seen, Ford's wife told them, "Well, why don't you". They went ahead with the idea, leading to the creation of Music Fair Enterprises, Inc. Together with Shelly Gross, a television news anchor who had become disenchanted with his profession, the three raised $100,000 to lease the Devon, Pennsylvania, site of what they named the Valley Forge Music Fair, which brought in profits exceeding $50,000 in its inaugural season in 1955.

In 1956, a second facility was built on a portion of the grounds of the L. Lordi Sand and Gravel pit in Westbury, New York. This industrial origin accounts for the theater's unique subterranean position within an otherwise level landscape. Furthermore, the food and beverage stores adjacent to the theater's entrance road originally served as the maintenance bays for the site's excavation fleet.

They named it the Westbury Music Fair. The original facility was an uninsulated blue-and-beige-striped tent erected in 1956 that could accommodate 1,850, one of many similar tent-based theaters that existed nationwide in the mid-1950s. The tent was erected for $120,000 at a central Nassau County location conveniently located near the Northern State Parkway and the Wantagh State Parkway, although it was also on an approach path for planes landing at what later became John F. Kennedy International Airport, with occasional noise from overhead engines of planes muffling performers.

After Ford left, Gross and Guber constructed a theater on the site in 1966 that could fit 3,000 attendees. The new, permanent facility was a concrete building with carpeted floors and 3,000 metal director's chairs. Soon, fully upholstered seats were installed. The facility was also climate controlled with heating and air conditioning. The building continued the theater-in-the-round format used in the original tent, which offered clear and close views from all seats and a more intimate proximity to performers, while keeping production costs down, as sets could be minimally designed.

In its first year, which featured performances such as a production of The King and I, the theater grossed $230,000. By 1976, revenue had grown more than 50-fold, to $13 million. Ticket prices that had started at $2.50-to-$4.50 when the theater opened, had climbed to an average price of $8.75 by 1976.

SFX Entertainment acquired the facility in 1998, and it is now owned and operated by Live Nation. In 2005, North Fork Bank acquired three-year naming rights to the venue; becoming the North Fork Theatre in Westbury. In 2008, the bank was taken over by Capital One. On March 24, 2008, the theater was renamed the Capital One Bank Theatre at Westbury. After one year, Capital One dropped naming rights and the venue briefly became known as the Theatre at Westbury. New York Community Bank purchased naming rights in May 2010, with the theater being known as the NYCB Theatre in Westbury starting in July 2010. As of March 2024, the venue has restored part of its original name and is now Flagstar at Westbury Music Fair.

Among the stars and groups who performed at the suburban theater are The Doors, The Who, Alanis Morissette, The Supremes, The Jackson 5, The Pointer Sisters, Janis Joplin, Nina Simone, Chicago, Peter Cetera, Linda Ronstadt & the Stone Poneys, Sam the Sham & the Pharaohs, Eric Burdon & the Animals, Roger Whittaker, Johnny Mathis, Tony Bennett, Jack Benny, Milton Berle, George Carlin, Ray Charles, Bill Cosby, Johnny Carson, Sammy Davis Jr., Sergio Franchi, Alan Jones, Connie Francis, The Carpenters, Bobby Sherman, Steve Vai, Sam Kinison, Britney Spears, 'N Sync, Judy Garland, Bob Hope, Jonas Brothers, Liza Minnelli, Don Rickles, George Maharis, Vivian Blaine, Frankie Valli, Smokey Robinson, Kenny Rogers, John Serry Sr., Frank Sinatra, Jim Norton, Bruce Springsteen, Don Imus, Barry Manilow,Mike Tyson, Lena Horne, Stevie Wonder, Ringo Starr & His All-Starr Band, Bob Weir, RatDog, Chris Isaak, Jerry Seinfeld, Bob Saget, James Hunter, Styx, Vince Gill, Helen Reddy, Joan Rivers, Olivia Newton-John, Vanessa Williams, Dionne Warwick, Gladys Knight, Stray Cats, Mitzi Gaynor, Barbara Eden, Dom DeLuise, Paul Anka, Engelbert Humperdinck, Howie Mandel, Weird Al Yankovic, The Wiggles & Video Games Live among others. The live tracks on Nina Simone's 1968 album 'Nuff Said! were recorded at the theater three days after the assassination of Martin Luther King Jr.

As a theater in the round, it is considered a suitable arena for professional wrestling, as Total Nonstop Action Wrestling has performed shows at the theater.

== See also ==
- House Of Blues
