= Jenkins Arboretum =

Nonprofit botanical garden in Devon, Pennsylvania, United States

Coordinates: 40.06166°N 75.4326°W

Jenkins Arboretum & Gardens
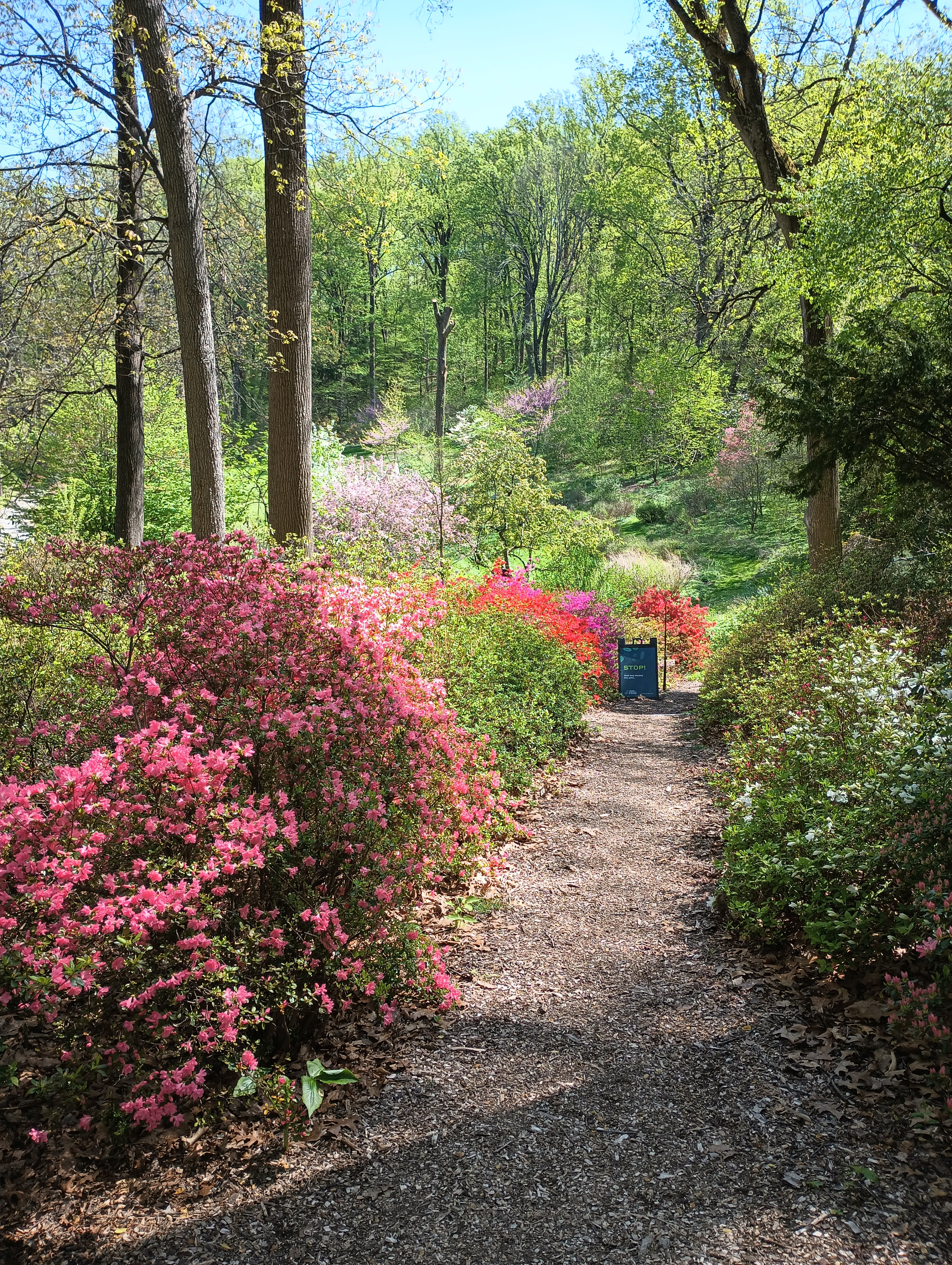
- Interactive map of Jenkins Arboretum & Gardens
- Location: Devon, Pennsylvania
- Area: 48 acres (19 ha)
- Founder: H. Lawrence Jenkins
- Open: Open daily, free admission.
- Website: Official website

Jenkins Arboretum & Gardens is a 48 acres (19 ha) nonprofit botanical garden located at 631 Berwyn Baptist Road, Devon, Pennsylvania. The grounds are open to the public daily with free admission. Hours change seasonally and are listed on the Arboretum's website.

== History ==
The Arboretum was established by H. Lawrence Jenkins in 1968 as a living memorial to his wife Elisabeth Phillippe Jenkins. In his will, Jenkins designated that the 20-acre property become a "public park, arboretum, and wildlife sanctuary for use by the public and responsible organizations engaged in the study of arboriculture, horticulture, and wildlife for educational and scientific purposes". In 1972 Louisa P. Browning donated 26 acres (110,000 m^{2}) of adjoining property to the Arboretum, more than doubling its size.

Early surveys of the property determined that the best plants to grow in the rocky, acidic soil would be those in the heath family (Ericaceae). Rhododendrons and azaleas were chosen as the primary collection. The Arboretum officially opened to the public in 1976 and today has one of the most significant collections of azaleas and rhododendrons in the country.

In addition to the Rhododendron collection, the Arboretum features numerous native trees, shrubs, ferns, and wildflowers that can be found in several different garden areas. The botanical diversity of the site also supports many varieties of wildlife. Foxes, turtles, hawks, small mammals, and nearly 100 species of songbirds frequent the Arboretum.

In 2009, the Arboretum completed construction of the John J. Willaman Education Center, which is a LEED Gold Certified building that serves as an activity hub for staff, volunteers, and visitors.

== Gallery ==
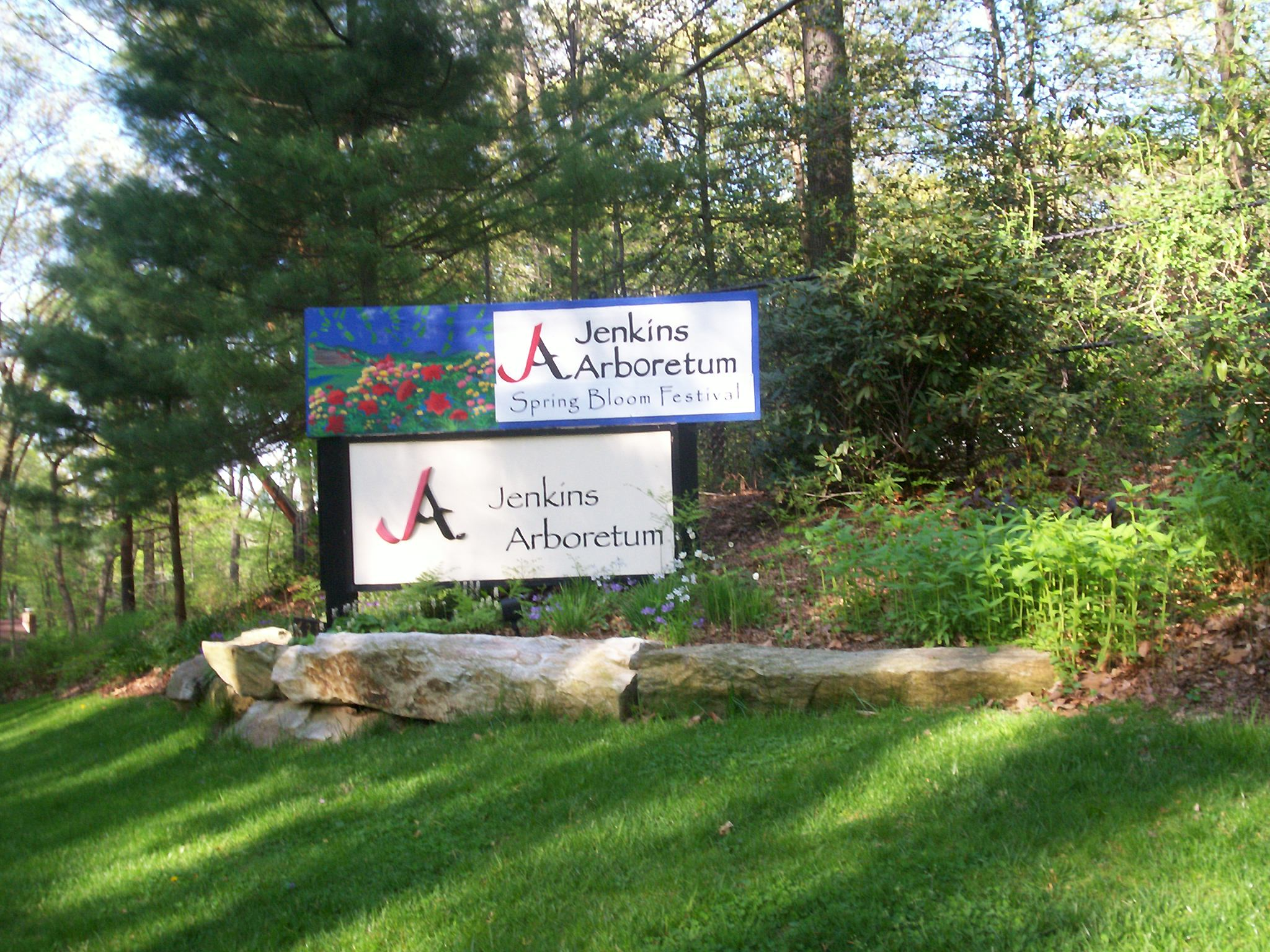

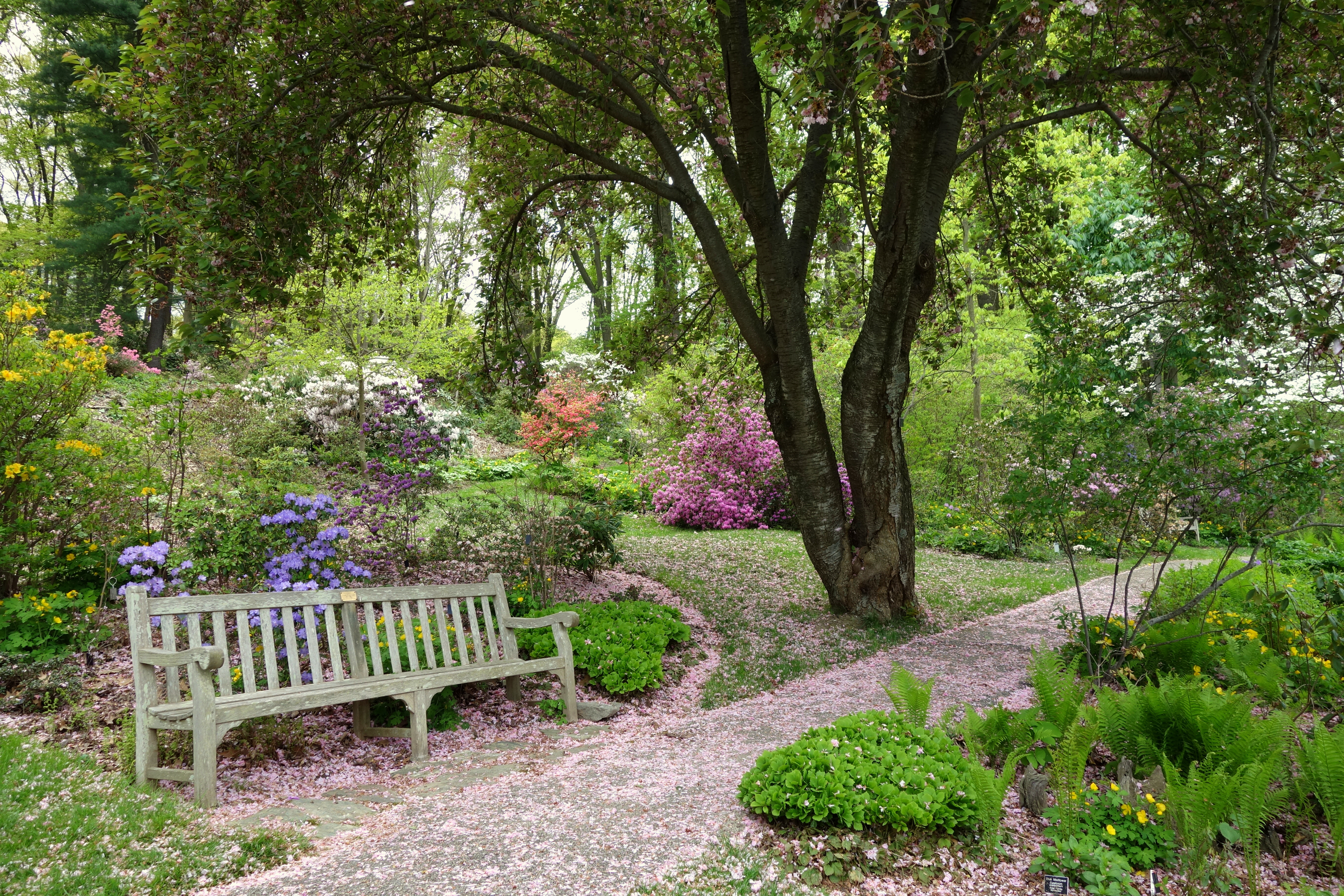

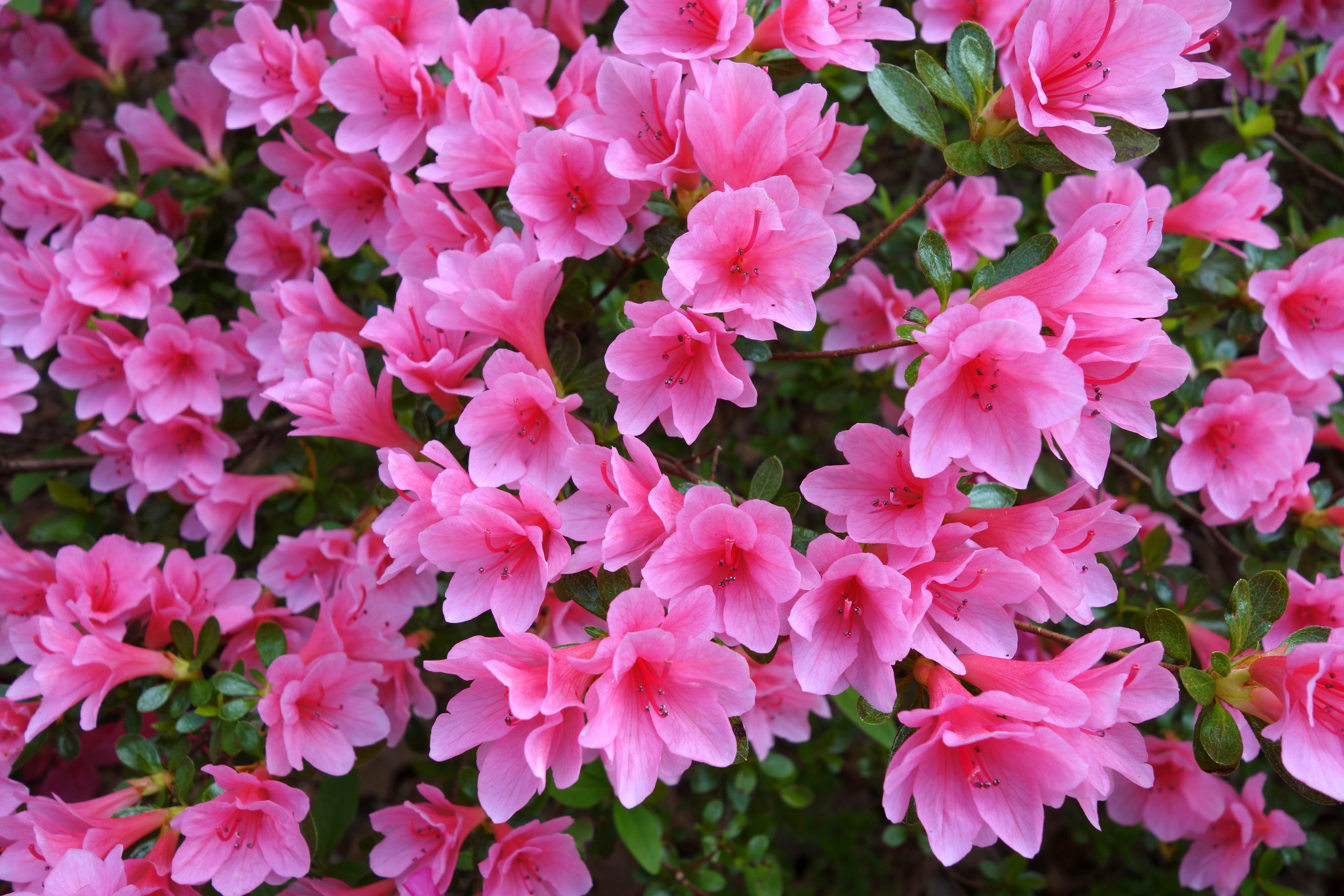

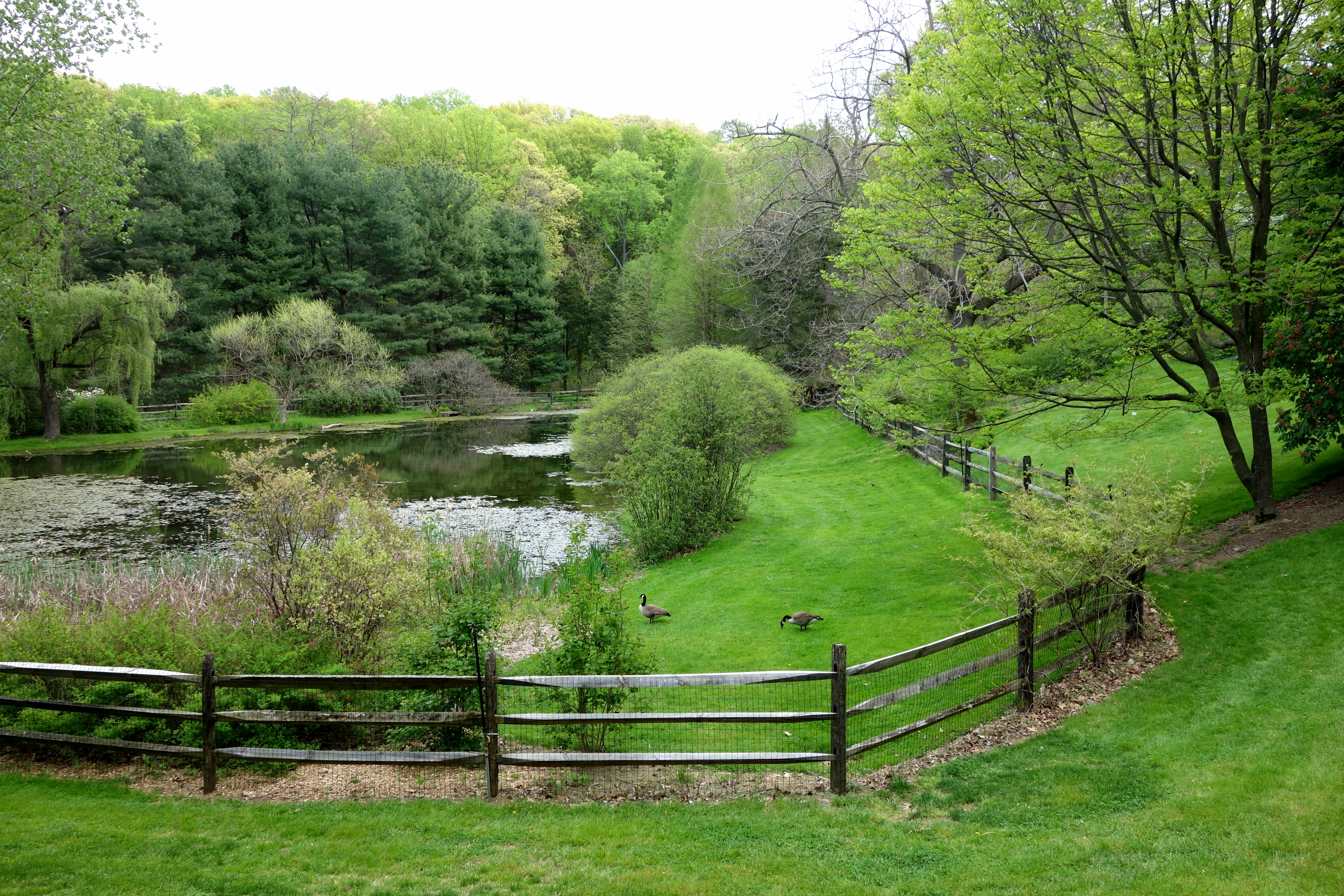

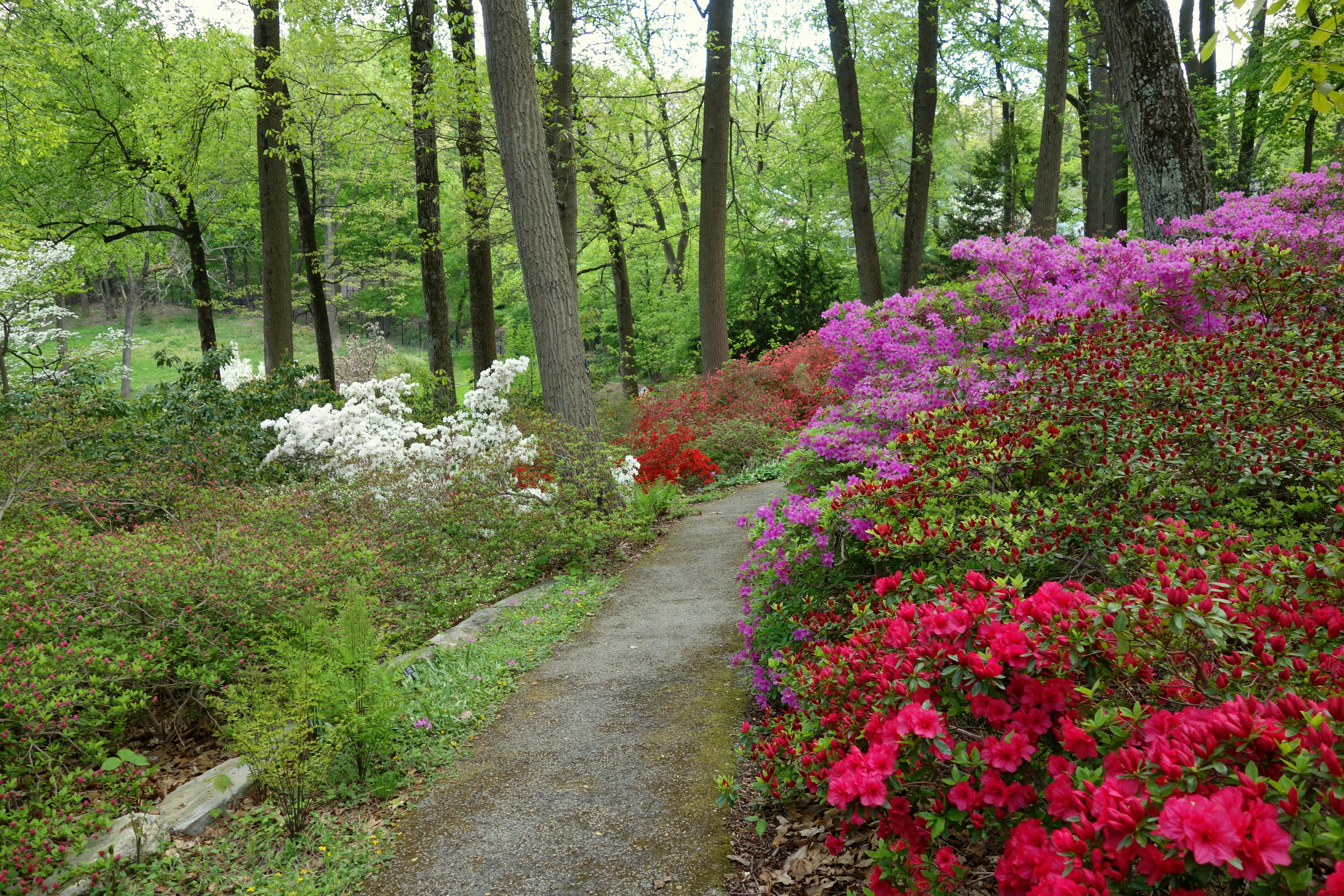

== See also ==
- List of botanical gardens in the United States
