= The Daily Beast =

American news publication

- Website type: News
- Available in: English
- Headquarters: New York City, United States
- Owner: People Incorporated
- Creator: Tina Brown
- Editor: Hugh Dougherty
- CEO: Ben Sherwood
- Website: www.thedailybeast.com
- Commercial: Yes
- Registration: Optional
- Launched: October 6, 2008; 17 years ago
- Current status: Active

The Daily Beast is an American news website focused on politics, media, and pop culture. Founded in 2008, the website is owned by People Incorporated. It has been characterized as a "high-end tabloid" by Noah Shachtman, the site's editor-in-chief from 2018 to 2021. In a 2015 interview, former editor-in-chief John Avlon described the Beast's editorial approach: "We seek out scoops, scandals, and stories about secret worlds; we love confronting bullies, bigots, and hypocrites." In 2018, Avlon described the Beast's "strike zone" as "politics, pop culture, and power".

== History ==
The Daily Beast began publishing on October 6, 2008. Its founding editor was Tina Brown, a former editor of Vanity Fair and The New Yorker as well as the short-lived Talk magazine. The name of the site was taken from a fictional newspaper in Evelyn Waugh's novel Scoop.

In 2010, The Daily Beast merged with the magazine Newsweek creating a combined company, The Newsweek Daily Beast Company. The merger ended in 2013, when Daily Beast owner IAC sold Newsweek to IBT Media, owner of the International Business Times. Brown stepped down as editor in September 2013.

John Avlon, an American journalist and political commentator as well as a CNN contributor, was the site's editor-in-chief and managing director from 2013 to 2018.

In September 2014, The Daily Beast reached a new record of 21 million unique visitors – a 60% year-over-year increase in readers, accompanied by a 300% increase in the overall size of its social media community.

In May 2018, Avlon departed from the Beast to become full-time Senior Political Analyst and anchor at CNN. Avlon was succeeded by executive editor Noah Shachtman.

In March 2017, former chief strategy and product officer Mike Dyer left for Intel. In May 2017, Heather Dietrick was appointed president and publisher. In July 2021, Shachtman announced that he'd be moving from the Beast to Rolling Stone and that he would be succeeded by Tracy Connor.

In January 2023, it was reported by The New York Times that IAC chairman Barry Diller was considering a sale of The Daily Beast. In June 2023, however, Diller publicly acknowledged that he had ended talks to sell The Daily Beast, stating that it is "not for sale."

In April 2024, Diller hired Ben Sherwood as chief executive and publisher, and Joanna Coles as chief creative and content officer. Employees were offered voluntary buyouts in May in an effort to cut costs. About 70% of unionized workers took the buyout, including almost all of the Beast's senior staffers.

== Editorial stance ==
In an April 2018 interview, Avlon described the publication's political stance as "non-partisan but not neutral": "what that means is we're going to hit both sides where appropriate, but we're not going for mythic moral equivalence on every issue." In April 2017, Avlon discussed the organization's approach on the Poynter Institute's podcast saying, "We're not going to toe any partisan line."

In December 2017, NPR reported that The Daily Beast's editor-in-chief John Avlon had begun pairing reporters from both the right and left sides of the political spectrum to cover White House stories. Specifically, reporters Asawin Suebsaeng (formerly of Mother Jones) and Lachlan Markay (formerly of The Heritage Foundation) were tasked with covering the first Trump administration.

The Washington Post media critic Erik Wemple stated in 2018 that "Pound for pound, [The Daily Beast] is an impressive operation. As I see it, they do a few things well: They bang the phones, they don't always follow the same story everyone else is doing, and they are fast." Later in 2018, editor-in-chief Noah Shachtman characterized The Daily Beast as a "high-end tabloid" that embraces gonzo journalism.

According to Shachtman, The Daily Beast's social media policy for journalists consists (as of 2018) of three main rules: "you're reporters, not cheerleaders" so do not be an open partisan; avoid hate speech and posts that could offend a group; and "don't get your fellow reporters in trouble". The Atlantic and GBH News described the website's political stance as "liberal leaning" in 2024 and 2012 respectively. Business Insider described The Daily Beast's newsroom as "left-leaning".

== Format ==
A feature of The Daily Beast is the Cheat Sheet, billed as "must reads from all over". Published throughout the day, the Cheat Sheet offers a selection of articles from online news outlets on popular stories. The Cheat Sheet includes brief summaries of the article, and a link to read the full text of the article on the website of its provider. It is found at www.thedailybeast.com/cheat-sheet.

After the launch, the site introduced additional sections, including a video Cheat Sheet and Book Beast. The site frequently creates encyclopedic landing pages on topical subjects such as President Obama's inauguration, the Bernard Madoff Ponzi scheme, and the Iran uprising. In 2014, The Daily Beast became the majority on mobile and released an iOS app, which Nieman Lab described as "the dawn of the quantified news reader".

The illustrational style used at the top of every article has been described as "jaunty collage and pop-art illustrations".

== Contributors ==
Contributors to the publication include notable writers and political activists such as:

- Jake Adelstein
- Ayaan Hirsi Ali
- Samantha Leigh Allen
- Martin Amis
- John Avlon
- Mike Barnicle
- Peter Beinart
- Buzz Bissinger
- Jamelle Bouie
- Jimmy Breslin
- Tina Brown
- Christopher Buckley
- Gordon Chang
- Ron Christie
- Eleanor Clift
- Ana Marie Cox
- Christopher Dickey
- Diane Dimond
- Kim Dozier
- Joshua Dubois
- Mark Ebner
- Jon Favreau
- Ron Filipkowski
- David Frum
- Leslie H. Gelb
- Daniel Genis
- Michelle Goldberg
- Dan Goldman
- Daniel Gross
- Lloyd Grove
- Shane Harris
- Molly Jong-Fast
- Jackie Kucinich
- Eli Lake
- Bernard Henri Levy
- Matt K. Lewis
- Ira Madison III
- Meghan McCain
- Mark McKinnon
- Michael Moynihan
- Candida Moss
- Maajid Nawaz
- Olivia Nuzzi
- Dean Obeidallah
- P. J. O'Rourke
- Kirsten Powers
- Joy-Ann Reid
- Josh Rogin
- Noah Shachtman
- Mimi Sheraton
- Harry Siegel
- Will Sommer
- Stuart Stevens
- Goldie Taylor
- Michael Tomasky
- Touré
- Michael Weiss
- Rick Wilson
- Mari Yamamoto

In May 2017, Pulitzer Prize–winning national security reporter Spencer Ackerman left The Guardian and joined The Daily Beast.

In June 2017, HuffPost senior political editor Sam Stein announced he was joining The Daily Beast in the same capacity.

== Reach ==
In early June 2014, Capital New York re-published a memo by outgoing CEO Rhona Murphy, stating that The Daily Beast's average unique monthly visitors increased from 13.5 million in 2013 to more than 17 million in 2014. By September 2014, the website reached a new record of 21 million unique visitors; it was a 60% year-over-year increase in readers, accompanied by a 300% increase in the overall size of its social media community.

In 2015, Ken Doctor, a news analyst for Nieman Lab, reported that The Daily Beast is "one of the fastest-growing news and information sites year-over-year in the 'General News' category".

During Avlon's leadership from 2013 to 2018, The Daily Beast doubled its traffic to 1.1 million readers a day and won over 17 awards for journalistic excellence. Harvard University estimated that the website of The Daily Beast is visited by 33.83 million users every month.

== Awards ==
The Daily Beast won a Webby Award for "Best News Site" in 2012 and 2013. Also in 2012 John Avlon won National Society of Newspaper Columnists' award for best online column in 2012 for The Daily Beast.

In March 2012, "Book Beast" won a National Magazine Award for Website Department, which "honors a department, channel or microsite".

Anna Nemstova received the Courage in Journalism Award in 2015 from the International Women's Media Foundation. Also that year, Michael Daly won with the National Society of Newspaper Columnists award in the category of Online, Blog, Multimedia – Over 100,000 Unique Visitors.

In 2016, the Los Angeles Press Club nominated several of The Beast's writers including M. L. Nestel for Arts/Entertainment Investigative, Brandy Zadrozny and Ben Collins for best Celebrity Investigative, Malcolm Jones for best Obituary, Lizzie Crocker for Humor and Tim Teeman for Industry/ArtsHard News. Also nominated for best in field were Kevin Fallon for Industry/Arts Soft News and Melissa Leon for Industry/Arts Soft News.

The Association of LGBTQ Journalists or NLGJA nominated both Tim Teeman 2016 Journalist of the Year and Heather Boerner Excellence in HIV/AIDS Coverage. In 2017, NLGJA awarded Jay Michaelson for his coverage of GOP anti-LGBT legislation and Tim Teeman for reporting on ALS.

In 2017, the website won three New York Press Club Journalism Awards in the internet publishing categories of Entertainment News, Crime Reporting and Travel Reporting. In December, the Los Angeles Press Club's National Arts and Entertainment Journalism Awards announced the platform had won 4 awards for 2017 reporting including investigative articles about the Nate Parker rape case, comic Bob Smith's struggle with ALS and remembering Bill Paxton.

In 2018, the trade magazine Digiday awarded the Beast's Cheat Sheet for best email newsletter.

== Beast Books ==
In September 2009, The Daily Beast launched a publishing initiative entitled "Beast Books" that will produce books by Beast writers on an accelerated publishing schedule. The first book published by Beast Books was John Avlon's Wingnuts: How the Lunatic Fringe is Hijacking America.

In January 2011, they published Stephen L. Carter's The Violence of Peace: America's Wars in the Age of Obama. Also in 2011, Beast Books published Nobel Peace Prize winner Leymah Gbowee's memoir, Mighty Be Our Powers.

== Controversies ==
=== Plagiarism ===
In February 2010, Jack Shafer of Slate magazine reported that the chief investigative reporter for The Daily Beast, Gerald Posner, had plagiarised five sentences from an article published by the Miami Herald. Shafer also discovered that Posner had plagiarized content from a Miami Herald blog, a Miami Herald editorial, Texas Lawyer magazine and a health care journalism blog. Posner was dismissed from The Daily Beast following an internal review.

=== Nico Hines' 2016 Olympics article ===
On August 11, 2016, The Daily Beast published an article entitled "I Got Three Grindr Dates in an Hour in the Olympic Village", written by Nico Hines, the site's London editor, who was assigned to cover the Olympic Games. Hines, a heterosexual married man, signed up for several gay and straight dating apps, including Tinder, Bumble and Grindr, and documented his experiences in the Olympic Village. While not specifically naming names, Hines provided enough detail in the article to identify individual athletes, leading to widespread criticism that this information could be used against closeted gay athletes, especially those living in repressive countries. Facing intense backlash online, The Daily Beast edited the piece to remove details that could allow athletes to be identified, and editor in chief John Avlon added a lengthy editor's note. Criticism challenging the value of the piece continued, and The Daily Beast eventually removed the article altogether and issued an apology. In March 2017, Hines issued a formal apology for his actions, and it was announced by the website's editor Hines would be returning to The Daily Beast "following a lengthy period of intense reflection".

Andrew M. Seaman, ethics committee chair for the Society of Professional Journalists, called the article "journalistic trash, unethical and dangerous". The National Lesbian and Gay Journalists Association stated "The reporting was unethical, extremely careless of individual privacy and potentially dangerous to the athletes". Vince Gonzales, professor of professional practice at USC Annenberg School for Communication and Journalism wrote "I think this borders on journalistic malpractice". The president of GLAAD, Sarah Kate Ellis, wrote "How this reporter thought it was OK—or that somehow it was in the public's interest—to write about his deceitful encounters with these men reflects a complete lack of judgment and disregard for basic decency, not to mention the ethics of journalism". Swimmer Amini Fonua, who represented Tonga at the Rio games, criticized the article as 'deplorable', writing: "It is still illegal to be gay in Tonga, and while I'm strong enough to be me in front of the world, not everybody else is. Respect that."

=== Doxing accusation ===
In June 2019, The Daily Beast reporter Kevin Poulsen was accused of doxing Shawn Brooks, a 34-year-old Trump supporter living in the Bronx, when Poulsen revealed his identity for being the alleged creator and disseminator of a widely shared fake video, which showed American politician Nancy Pelosi speaking in a slurred manner. The fake video had been shared over 60,000 times on Facebook and had more than 4 million views, and also spread to Twitter and YouTube.

In response, Brooks denied creating the fake video, despite admitting to being one of the administrators of the group that originally posted the video, Politics WatchDog, and blamed a "female admin" of the group. Brooks also said that he would sue The Daily Beast and Poulsen for publishing "inaccurate trash", and created a GoFundMe page to raise money for legal costs, with a goal of raising $10,000. As of the morning of June 3, 2019, he had raised more than $4,400.

==== Reactions ====
The Intercept co-founder Glenn Greenwald criticized The Daily Beast for revealing Brooks' identity, saying on Twitter that it was "repellent to unleash the resources of a major news outlet on an obscure, anonymous, powerless, quasi-unemployed citizen for the crime of trivially mocking the most powerful political leaders". HuffPost and New York contributor Yashar Ali also criticized The Daily Beast for revealing Brooks' identity, saying it "sets a really bad precedent when a private citizen has their identity publicly revealed simply because they made a video of a politician appearing to be drunk". The Daily Wire editor-in-chief Ben Shapiro said on Laura Ingraham's The Ingraham Angle on June 3 that "My impression was that if you are posting anonymously on Facebook, then it's not really within Facebook's purview to start handing that information to media outlets, but I guess that isn't true".

Other journalists who criticized The Daily Beast include freelance journalist and former The Young Turks journalist Michael Tracey, who said on Twitter that "No one on the planet ever thought "disinformation is the purview of Russia alone" other than self-aggrandizing, sleazy, click-chasing Daily Beast journalists", and media editor for TheWrap Jon Levine, who called the article a "hit job over a joke video that happened to go viral".

When The Daily Beast editor Noah Shachtman was asked about these criticisms by CNN media reporter Brian Stelter on his Reliable Sources show on June 2, 2019, Shachtman defended the article, noting that the fake video had reached "the highest levels of power, with Rudy Giuliani himself tweeting it out" and therefore, according to Shachtman, it was worth identifying the creator of the fake video. Shachtman said Poulsen spoke with Brooks in an on-the-record interview for an hour.

=== Description of Israel Defense Forces ===
In August 2021, The Daily Beast published an article criticizing Mayim Bialik's appointment as the new host of Jeopardy!, which described the Israel Defense Forces as "genocidal"; after human rights lawyers and members of the Jewish community objected, The Daily Beast removed the word and stated that it would review its editorial policy on the use of the term "genocide".

=== Carson Griffith defamation lawsuit ===
In 2020, journalist Carson Griffith sued The Daily Beast, staff writer Maxwell Tani, and editor-in-chief Noah Shachtman for defamation over an article that alleged that Griffith made offensive comments in her role at Gawker. On March 24, 2021, a trial court judge denied a motion to dismiss the lawsuit. On August 9, 2022, another judge denied a motion to dismiss under New York's recently amended anti-SLAPP law. On May 16, 2023, a New York appeals court dismissed the lawsuit.
