= Frank Ford (broadcaster) =

American radio talk show host (1916–2009)

- Born: September 30, 1916; Philadelphia, Pennsylvania, U.S.
- Died: March 3, 2009 (aged 92); Philadelphia, Pennsylvania, U.S.
- Occupations: Radio personality, businessman

Frank Ford was the stage name of Edward Felbin (September 30, 1916 – March 3, 2009), a talk radio host in Philadelphia. Along with partners Lee Guber and Shelly Gross, Ford founded the Valley Forge Music Fair in 1955 and the Westbury Music Fair the following year. He served on the board of trustees for Science Service, now known as Society for Science & the Public, from 1957 to 1962.

He was married to Lynne Abraham, a former judge and District Attorney of Philadelphia, Pennsylvania.

== Early life and education ==
Born as Edward Felbin, he grew up in the Logan section of North Philadelphia, where he graduated from Simon Gratz High School in 1934. He attended the University of Pennsylvania, where he graduated in 1939.

== Career ==
While in college, he got a job at radio station WHAT as an announcer, earning $15 weekly plus transportation. He used the name "Eddie Hoyle" while hosting Hollywood According to Hoyle, a gossip program. While selling radio time in 1946, a customer called Frankford Unity Grocery Store wanted to sponsor a music show; He decided that he would host the show himself to pick up a few extra dollars, and adopted the name "Frank Ford" for the show, a name that stuck with him for the rest of his life. In a 1995 interview with the Philadelphia Daily News, he wondered "what my name would be if the sponsor was the Piggly Wiggly stores."

Together with partners Lee Guber and Shelly Gross, he opened the Valley Forge Music Fair in Devon, Pennsylvania in 1955, featuring such shows as its inaugural production of The King and I. Originally housed in a tent, a building was constructed on the site as a theater. Opened on an investment of $100,000, the business brought in a profit of about $50,000 their first summer, leading to the establishment of the Westbury Music Fair in Westbury, New York and other locations in Cherry Hill, New Jersey, and near both Baltimore and Washington, D.C., employing 2,000 performers and musicians at their peak.

He hosted a late-night talk show on WPEN, becoming one of the first shows to use equipment that would allow the host to interact directly with callers on the air, unlike previous shows that had the host repeat the caller's comments. In the early 1970s, he did multiple interviews with "Unicorn Killer" Ira Einhorn, who had murdered girlfriend Holly Maddux, later recalling that Einhorn "stank even then". He bought station WDVT in 1985, where his programming included a show hosted by publisher Mark Segal of the Philadelphia Gay News that was the city's first show on commercial radio with a gay focus. The station closed in 1988. He retired in 2000, after WWDB-FM switched to an all-music format.

Guests on Ford's programs during his career included Lenny Bruce, Abbie Hoffman, Sugar Ray Robinson and Eleanor Roosevelt. He owned Auto Sport Importers, a business that made reproductions of a classic 1938 Jaguar called the Squire SS100, a model that sold several hundred cars but was never a viable business.

The Broadcast Pioneers of Philadelphia inducted Ford into their Hall of Fame in 2004.

== Personal life ==
Ford first met his future wife, Lynne Abraham, 24 years his junior, when she helped watch his ill father while his mother ran errands. Ford helped her get a job when she was a teen at the Valley Forge Music Fair he opened in 1955. Years later, when Abraham was in college, she would babysit for his stepdaughter. Abraham had been thinking of medical school and becoming a physician, when Ford told her "You ought to be a lawyer. You're forthright. You've got a big mouth. You talk well. You're smart."

He married Abraham in June 1977, when he was 60 years old and hosting local radio talk shows, and she was a 36-year-old municipal court judge. She was an elected judge serving on the Pennsylvania Courts of Common Pleas when she was considering a run for Philadelphia District Attorney. Ford tried to dissuade her, telling Abraham that she would be losing her judicial tenure and would be taking a reduction in pay. Despite his objections, Abraham ran for office and was elected in 1991. Ford was extremely supportive of his wife's post, and regularly attended her press conferences and had her on his radio show until he became ill in October 2008. Ford was interested in architecture, art, dance, opera and food, and he and Abraham traveled extensively around the world.

== Death ==
A longtime resident of Center City, Philadelphia, Ford died, at age 92, on March 3, 2009, at Vitas Hospice of St. Agnes Hospital in Philadelphia due to complications from a stroke. He was survived by both his first and second wives, a daughter, two grandchildren and a great-grandson.

== See also ==
- Media of Philadelphia
