= Lee Guber =

American theater impresario (1920–1988)

- Born: November 20, 1920; Philadelphia, Pennsylvania, U.S.
- Died: March 27, 1988 (aged 67); Manhattan, New York, U.S.
- Education: Temple University
- Occupation: Theater impresario
- Known for: Producer of Broadway theatre productions
- Spouses: Edna Shanis (divorced); Barbara Walters (m. 1963; div. 1976) Lois Wyse (m. 1982)
- Children: 3
- Relatives: Noah Shachtman (grandson)

Lee Guber (November 20, 1920 – March 27, 1988) was an American theater impresario, who produced several Broadway theatre productions and developed a chain of entertainment venues in suburban locations along the East Coast.

== Early life and education ==
Guber was born in Philadelphia on November 20, 1920. He attended Central High School, where he met his future business partner Shelly Gross, when they were assigned to sit next to each other in alphabetical order. He attended Temple University, where he majored in sociology, earning bachelor's and master's degrees.

== Entertainment ==
Guber went into the nightclub business, and joined his childhood friend Shelly Gross and Frank Ford in creating a musical theater in Devon, Pennsylvania in 1955 called the Valley Forge Music Fair. The original tent was replaced by a permanent structure, which was subsequently razed and replaced by a supermarket.

The group was advised to open a second theater in Westbury, New York, a suburb of New York City, but Guber asked "Where's Long Island?" when told the proposed location. The original Westbury Music Fair was housed in a tent that was constructed on what had been the site of a lime pit, with a $1 million building constructed several years later that included 3,000 seats in a theater in the round format.

Guber and Gross built their business to become one of the biggest purveyors of live entertainment, using their venues in Valley Forge and Westbury, as well as the Painters Mill Music Fair near Baltimore and the Shady Grove Music Theater near Washington, D.C. The group also operated a wax museum and advertising agency, both based in Philadelphia, and operated a theater in the Deauville Hotel in Miami Beach, Florida. The group brought in many star performers, including Jack Benny, Maurice Chevalier, Perry Como, Sammy Davis Jr., Bobby Vinton, Dionne Warwick, Andy Williams and Stevie Wonder, along with such Broadway shows as traveling productions of Cabaret, Fiddler on the Roof, George M! and Man of La Mancha, to their suburban venues.

Guber, Ford and Gross Productions aimed to resurrect the popular 50s and 60s TV series, Dialing for Dollars, with Canadian television personality Peter Emmerson slated to be the Host, but Lee Guber's diagnosis of terminal brain cancer brought those plans to a halt in 1987.

== Broadway theatre ==
In 1977, the pair produced a 696-performance run of The King and I, with Yul Brynner in the lead, in which investors were paid back after 14 weeks and weekly grosses exceeded $200,000. A production of Lorelei starring Carol Channing ran for a year. A 1965 production of Catch Me If You Can ran for 103 performances, while their 1967 Sherry! musical based on the play The Man Who Came to Dinner ran for 71 shows. 1981's Bring Back Birdie, a sequel to Bye Bye Birdie that earned Chita Rivera a Tony Award nomination for Best Actress in a Musical, ran for only four performances, as did the 1986 musical Rags about immigrants to the United States that cost over $5 million to produce.

== Personal life ==
He was married three times. His first marriage was to Edna Shanis. The couple had two children together, Zev and Carol.

In December 1963 Guber was married to Barbara Walters, then a reporter for NBC, beginning a marriage that lasted 13 years. Their daughter Jacqueline Dena Guber was born in 1968 and adopted by the couple the same year.

His third marriage was in 1982 to Lois Wyse, with whom he remained married until his death. His stepchildren are Robert Wyse and Katherine Goldman. He has eight grandchildren, one journalist Noah Shachtman.

Guber enjoyed playing squash and tennis, and was described by The New York Times as "an accomplished cook" who learned his culinary skills from James Beard. He was appointed to serve on the New York State Council on the Arts in the mid-1970s.

A resident of Manhattan's Upper East Side, Guber died at age 67 on March 27, 1988, at his home due to brain cancer.
