= Valley Forge Music Fair =

Former entertainment venue located in Devon, Pennsylvania

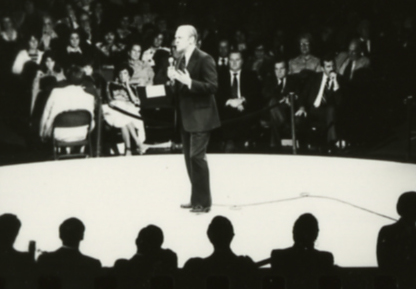
- President Gerald Ford holds a campaign rally at the venue in 1976.
- Interactive map of Valley Forge Music Fair
- Address: 176 West Swedesford Road, Devon, PA 19333
- Coordinates: 40.070°N 75.441°W
- Capacity: 2,932

Construction
- Built: 1955
- Closed: 1996

The Valley Forge Music Fair was an entertainment venue located in Devon, Pennsylvania, outside of Philadelphia, constructed in theater in the round style with seating for 2,932. Initially established in a tent in 1955, a permanent structure was constructed that closed in 1996. The Valley Forge site became a model that led to the creation of a series of venues located in suburban locations on the East Coast of the United States that became a means to present top performers and productions of popular theatrical musicals at reasonable prices outside of the big cities.

== History ==
Radio broadcaster Frank Ford and nightclub owner Lee Guber were returning home with their wives after attending a 1954 musical performance presented in a tent. After the two kept commenting on how they could improve on the show they had just seen, Ford's wife told them "Well, why don't you". They went ahead with the idea, leading the creation of Music Fair Enterprises, Inc. Together with Shelly Gross, a television news anchor who had become disenchanted with his profession, the three raised $100,000 to lease the Devon, Pennsylvania site of what they named the Valley Forge Music Fair, which brought in profits exceeding $50,000 in its inaugural season in 1955. Another founding member was H.C. Van Arsdale, President of SmithKline, Inc., who later defended Music Fair, along with other founders, from legal challenges.

The first facility in Devon was a tent, a not uncommon sight in the mid-1950s. The exposure to the elements, including heat, cold, rain and snow was a problem, and the tent had even been blown down once by strong wind. A permanent structure was constructed on the site in 1973.

The final performance was a Kenny Rogers Christmas show in December 1996. After the closing was announced, with site to be replaced by a Giant supermarket, Gross recalled being conflicted, feeling that it was "like watching your mother-in-law drive off a cliff in your brand-new Mercedes – mixed emotions." The supermarket closed down after 16 months in business.

As of December 2014, a local casino has begun using the phrase "Valley Forge Music Fair" in promoting some of its shows.

== Other projects ==
The success of their facility in Devon led to efforts to replicate the model, and the creation of other music fairs in suburban locations on the East Coast. An abandoned lime pit in Westbury, New York, a Long Island suburb of New York City, became the site of their second facility, the Westbury Music Fair, established in 1956, also originally housed in a tent, developed on an investment of $150,000.

1957 brought the Camden County Music Fair, also a tent, by the Cooper River in Cherry Hill, New Jersey, on an investment of $135,000. Such shows as "Damn Yankees" and "No Time for Sergeants" played to sold out audiences. In 1959, the group invested an additional $135,000 to create the Storrowton Music Fair in West Springfield, Massachusetts. In later years they would open facilities near Atlantic City, New Jersey, the Baltimore area, Painters Mills Music Fair as well as the Washington, DC area Shady Grove Music Fair as well as operating theaters in Philadelphia, Cleveland Ohio Front Row Theater and in the Deauville Hotel in Miami Beach, Florida.
