= Shelly Gross =

American concert producer and promoter (1921–2009)

Sheldon Harvey Gross (May 20, 1921 – June 19, 2009) was an American producer and promoter of concerts and theatrical performances, who developed a number of venues in suburban areas outside major cities on the East Coast together with Lee Guber, bringing major stars and diverse entertainment options to local areas that previously could only be seen in major cities at significantly higher prices.

== Early life and education ==
Gross was born on May 20, 1921, in Philadelphia. There he attended Central High School, where he met future partner Lee Guber after the two were seated next to each other in alphabetical order, graduating as valedictorian. After graduating from the University of Pennsylvania in 1942 with a Phi Beta Kappa key, he attended Harvard Law School, but dropped out after coming to the realization that he didn't want to be a lawyer. He enlisted in the United States Navy, serving as a communications officer in the South Pacific and attaining the rank of Lieutenant. After completing his military service, Gross attended Northwestern University, graduating in 1947 with a master's degree in journalism.

== Television ==
His first media job was in Atlantic City, New Jersey, where he was a newscaster on station WFPG-TV. He took a spot at WFIL in Philadelphia, where was recognized as 1954's TV Guide Announcer of the Year. Gross was looking to shift out of television, recalling that the station "had me selling storm windows and beer", making him frustrated by the lack of creativity his position offered.

== Theatrical production ==
Gross had remained friendly with Guber, and together with Frank Ford they established the Valley Forge Music Fair in Devon, Pennsylvania in 1955, initially in a circus tent and later replaced by a permanent structure with 2,900 seats built in theater in the round style. The Valley Forge location was shuttered in 1996, leaving Gross conflicted, stating that "Well, it's like watching your mother-in-law drive off a cliff in your brand-new Mercedes – mixed emotions."

An abandoned lime pit in Westbury, New York, a Long Island suburb of New York City, became the site of the Westbury Music Fair. The original facility was an uninsulated tent that could accommodate 1,850, erected for $120,000 at a central Nassau County location near the Northern State Parkway and the Wantagh State Parkway. With Ford out of the picture, Gross and Guber constructed a theater on the site that could fit 3,000 attendees. SFX Entertainment acquired the facility in 1998, and it is now owned and operated by Live Nation and known as the Capital One Bank Theater at Westbury. Among the stars who performed at their suburban theaters were Tony Bennett, Jack Benny, Milton Berle, Ray Charles, Bill Cosby, Sammy Davis Jr., Judy Garland, Bob Hope, Liza Minnelli, Don Rickles, Smokey Robinson, Kenny Rogers, Frank Sinatra, Bruce Springsteen and Stevie Wonder.

Similar facilities established by the team included the Painters Mill Music Fair outside of Baltimore and the Shady Grove Music Fair outside Washington, D.C. They also ran the Deauville Star Theater at Miami Beach's Deauville Hotel, and the Camden County Music Fair in Cherry Hill, New Jersey. The pair ran a concert division that arranged performances nationwide, including traveling productions of Broadway theater hits such as Cabaret, Fiddler on the Roof, Gypsy and Man of La Mancha. They also produced theatrical revivals on Broadway, such as a year-long run of Lorelei in 1974 with Carol Channing, and a Yul Brenner-led production of The King and I that debuted in 1977 and ran for nearly 700 performances.

== Personal ==
He had moved to Lower Merion, Pennsylvania 1951, remaining there until 2003, when he relocated to Palm Beach Gardens, Florida. In Florida, he became involved with, and helped raise funds for, the non-profit regional theater, Palm Beach Dramaworks, located in downtown West Palm Beach.

Gross enjoyed fishing and playing chess. He also wrote several novels, including Havana X, Roots of Honor and Stardust. His 1978 book Havana X was about a CIA plot to assassinate Fidel Castro by taking out a Mafia contract at a cost of two million dollars on the Cuban leader, and was described in a brief review in The New York Times (to paraphrase) as an action-filled manhunt with a somewhat contrived ending, noting that he "writes well and has a cynical view of the men who run the world."

The Broadcast Pioneers of Philadelphia named Gross their Person of the Year in 1995 and inducted him into their Hall of Fame in 1999.

Gross died at age 88 on June 19, 2009, in Palm Beach Gardens due to bladder cancer. He was survived by his wife, the former Joan Seidel, as well as three sons and four grandchildren.
