= Devon-Berwyn, Pennsylvania =

- Former census-designated place
- Location of Devon-Berwyn in Pennsylvania Devon-Berwyn, Pennsylvania (the United States)
- Coordinates: 40°02′37″N 75°26′10″W
- Country: United States
- State: Pennsylvania
- County: Chester
- Townships: Easttown

Area
  - Total: 2.5 sq mi (6.5 km^{2})
  - Land: 2.5 sq mi (6.5 km^{2})
  - Water: 0.0 sq mi (0 km^{2})
- Elevation: 492 ft (150 m)

Population (2000)
  - Total: 5,067
  - Density: 2,000/sq mi (780/km^{2})
- Time zone: UTC-5 (EST)
  - Summer (DST): UTC-4 (EDT)
- Area code: 610

Devon-Berwyn was a census-designated place (CDP) in Chester County, Pennsylvania. The population was 5,067 at the 2000 census. For the 2010 census, the area was split into two separate CDPs, Devon and Berwyn. The area is part of the Philadelphia Main Line suburbs of Philadelphia.

Devon-Berwyn was entirely in Easttown Township. The two current CDPs of Devon and Berwyn are also in Easttown Township.

== Geography ==
Devon-Berwyn was located at 40°2′37″N 75°26′10″W (40.043675, -75.436130).

According to the U.S. Census Bureau, Devon-Berwyn had a total area of 2.5 square miles (6.5 km^{2}), all of it land.

== Demographics ==
As of the census of 2000, there were 5,067 people, 1,978 households, and 1,307 families residing in the CDP. The population density was 2,028.1 inhabitants per square mile (783.1/km^{2}). There were 2,035 housing units at an average density of 814.5 per square mile (314.5/km^{2}). The racial makeup of the CDP was 92.26% White, 4.52% African American, 0.16% Native American, 2.39% Asian, 0.06% from other races, and 0.61% from two or more races. Hispanic or Latino of any race were 1.14% of the population.

There were 1,978 households; of those, 29.5% had children under the age of 18 living with them, 55.8% were married couples living together, 8.2% had a female householder with no husband present, and 33.9% were non-families. 29.4% of all households were made up of individuals, and 15.4% had someone living alone who was 65 years of age or older. The average household size was 2.40 and the average family size was 3.00.

In the CDP, the population was spread out, with 22.8% under the age of 18, 4.3% from 18 to 24, 27.2% from 25 to 44, 24.4% from 45 to 64, and 21.4% who were 65 years of age or older. The median age was 42 years. For every 100 females, there were 89.6 males. For every 100 females age 18 and over, there were 83.7 males.

The median income for a household in the CDP was $74,886, and the median income for a family was $87,228. Males had a median income of $62,241 versus $39,824 for females. The per capita income for the CDP was $35,551. About 1.0% of families and 4.3% of the population were below the poverty line, including 1.0% of those under age 18 and 6.1% of those age 65 or over.
