= The Google Story =

2005 book by David A. Vise and Mark Malseed

The Google Story: Inside the Hottest Business, Media, and Technology Success of Our Time
- Book cover
- Author: David A. Vise, Mark Malseed
- Language: English
- Subject: Web search engine, Google
- Genre: Nonfiction
- Publisher: Delacorte Press
- Publication date: November 15, 2005
- ISBN: 9780553804577
- OCLC: 607806212

The Google Story is a book by David Vise and Mark Malseed that takes an in-depth look at the founding of Google and why it is unique among information technology companies. The book discusses the founders, the company, and the culture that Google is known for. It was published on November 15, 2005.

== Reception ==
Jennifer Barrett of Newsweek called the book "the most detailed account" of Google's remarkable ascent. The Contemporary Review said the work has "a worthwhile appendix". In a negative review, Australian Anthill's James C. Tuckerman stated, "The main shortfalling of David A. Rise's account of the rise and rise of the global internet search phenomenon, Google, is the shortness of the story itself and an almost deliberate lack of insight into the more difficult ethical model."

Booklist reviewer David Siegfried called the book an "inside look at this heretofore-secret enterprise". In a mixed review in the South Asian Journal of Management, business school professor Bhaskar Basu lamented that "the authors don't seem to have got any inside access to the founders, the CEO, the VCs or any other key protagonist". He also stated, "The strength of the book comes from its focus on the human side of the Google story, as opposed to the technical one."

== Audiobook adaptation ==
The audiobook adaptation of The Google Story was made by Books on Tape in 2005. Performed by Stephen Hoye, the audiobook is 10 hours long and takes up either seven cassette tapes or 10 CDs. Dale Farris, a reviewer for the School Library Journal, praised Hoye's "rich, solid narration". In a positive review, Mike Tribby of Booklist wrote that Hoye "delivers the terminally cheery and upbeat prose with a crisp reading, making intricate details of various lawsuits and sales gambits more than tolerable".
