= David A. Vise =

American journalist

- Born: David A. Vise; June 16, 1960 (age 66)
- Education: Wharton School of the University of Pennsylvania
- Occupation: Journalist
- Awards: Pulitzer Prize for Explanatory Reporting

David A. Vise (born June 16, 1960), is a journalist and author. He is a Senior Advisor to New Mountain Capital, a New York–based investment firm, and Executive Director of Modern States “Freshman Year for Free,” a philanthropy whose goal is to make college more accessible and affordable.

He won a Pulitzer Prize and the Gerald Loeb Award for Large Newspapers in 1990 while working as a business reporter for The Washington Post.

He has authored or co-authored four books, including The Bureau and the Mole (2002), about FBI agent and convicted spy Robert Hanssen, and The Google Story (2005), a national bestseller published in more than two dozen languages.

Vise received an MBA from Wharton School of the University of Pennsylvania. He holds an honorary Doctorate of Literary Letters from Cumberland University and studied at the London School of Economics. Wharton named him to a list of 125 influential alumni on its 125th anniversary. In 2009, Vise received The Joseph Wharton Award for career achievement and community service.

A past president of Washington Hebrew Congregation, Vise is a board member of the World Union for Progressive Judaism, where he focuses on interfaith relations. Vise was a member of the first WUPJ delegation to meet with the Vatican.

== Personal life ==
Vise, a first-generation American whose parents Harry and Doris Vise escaped Nazi Germany, is married to Lori Vise, a consultant with The College Consulting Collaborative who focuses on college planning for students with learning differences.

== Bibliography of publications ==
- Vise, David A., and Mark Malseed. The Google Story: Inside the Hottest Business, Media and Technology Success of Our Time. Paperback ed. Dell Pub., 2005. ISBN 9780553804577
- Vise, David A. The Bureau and the Mole: the Unmasking of Robert Philip Hanssen, the Most Dangerous Double Agent in FBI History. 1st ed. Grove/Atlantic, Inc., 2002. ISBN 9780871138347
- Vise, David A., and Gary Williams. Sweet Redemption: How Gary Williams and Maryland Beat Death and Despair to Win the NCAA Basketball Championship. Hardcover ed. Sports Pub., L.L.C., 2002.
- Vise, David A., and Steve Coll. Eagle on the Street: Based on the Pulitzer-Prize Winning Account of the SEC's battle with Wall Street. Paperback ed. Scribner, 1998.
