= Devon, Pennsylvania =

Unincorporated community in Pennsylvania, US

- Census-designated place
- Devon Horse Show

- Location in Chester County and the U.S. state of Pennsylvania.
- Coordinates: 40°2′59″N 75°25′32″W
- Country: United States
- State: Pennsylvania
- County: Chester
- Township: Easttown Township
- Established: 1681

Area
  - Total: 0.61 sq mi (1.59 km^{2})
  - Land: 0.61 sq mi (1.59 km^{2})
  - Water: 0 sq mi (0.00 km^{2})
- Elevation: 493 ft (150 m)

Population (2020)
  - Total: 1,580
  - Density: 2,577.7/sq mi (995.27/km^{2})
- Time zone: UTC-5 (Eastern (EST))
  - Summer (DST): UTC-4 (EDT)
- ZIP Code: 19333
- Area codes: 610 and 484
- FIPS code: 42-19040
- GNIS feature ID: 1173214

Devon is a census-designated place (CDP) located in Easttown township in Chester County, Pennsylvania, United States. The population was 1,515 at the 2010 census. The area is part of the Philadelphia Main Line suburbs.

== History ==
As of the 2000 U.S. census, prior to the 2010 U.S. census, Devon and Berwyn were in the same CDP: Devon-Berwyn. Devon was named after Devon, a county in southwestern England.

== Geography ==
Devon is located at 40°2′59″N 75°25′32″W. According to the U.S. Census Bureau, the CDP has a total area of 0.62 square miles (1.6 km^{2}), all land.

Historical population
| Census | Pop. | Note | %± |
|---|---|---|---|
| 2020 | 1,580 | | — |
U.S. Decennial Census

== Culture ==
Devon is known for the Devon Horse Show, the oldest and largest outdoor multi-breed horse competition in the United States. The event is held over ten days in late May and early June.

It was also home to the Valley Forge Music Fair from 1955 to 1996, hosting hundreds of famous musical and comedy acts.

== Education ==
The public school system is Tredyffrin-Easttown.

Most of Devon CDP lies within the boundary of Devon Elementary School, outside of the CDP. A small section is in the boundary of Hillside Elementary School in Tredyffrin Township.

The district operates two middle schools, Tredyffrin/Easttown and Valley Forge. Conestoga High School, located west of Devon, near Berwyn CDP, serves the CDP.

Devon Preparatory School, a Catholic school, is located just east of the CDP in Tredyffrin Township.

== Parks ==
Hilltop Park, with a Devon address but outside the Devon CDP, is operated by the township government. It has a pavilion with toilets, a picnic area, two soccer fields, a "tot lot" and walking trails.

== Notable people ==
- Dave Bush, baseball player and coach
- Chrissy Houlahan, U.S. representative from Pennsylvania's 6th congressional district
- Staci Keanan, attorney and actress
- Harold J. Lavell, US Army major general

== Points of interest ==
- Jenkins Arboretum, north of Devon
- Mount Zion A.M.E. Church
- Devon (SEPTA station)
- Devon Horse Show & Country Fair
- Valley Forge Music Fair (closed. 1996)
