= List of Wharton School alumni =

The list of notable Wharton School alumni are graduates of the Wharton School of the University of Pennsylvania. Wharton offers four degree programs: undergraduate, an MBA, an EMBA, and a Doctoral degree. As of 2023, there are approximately 105,000 alumni in over 150 countries, including 79,280 in North America, 5,660 in Asia, 4,510 in Europe, 1,370 in the Caribbean and Latin America, 930 in Africa and the Middle East, and 380 in Australia and New Zealand.

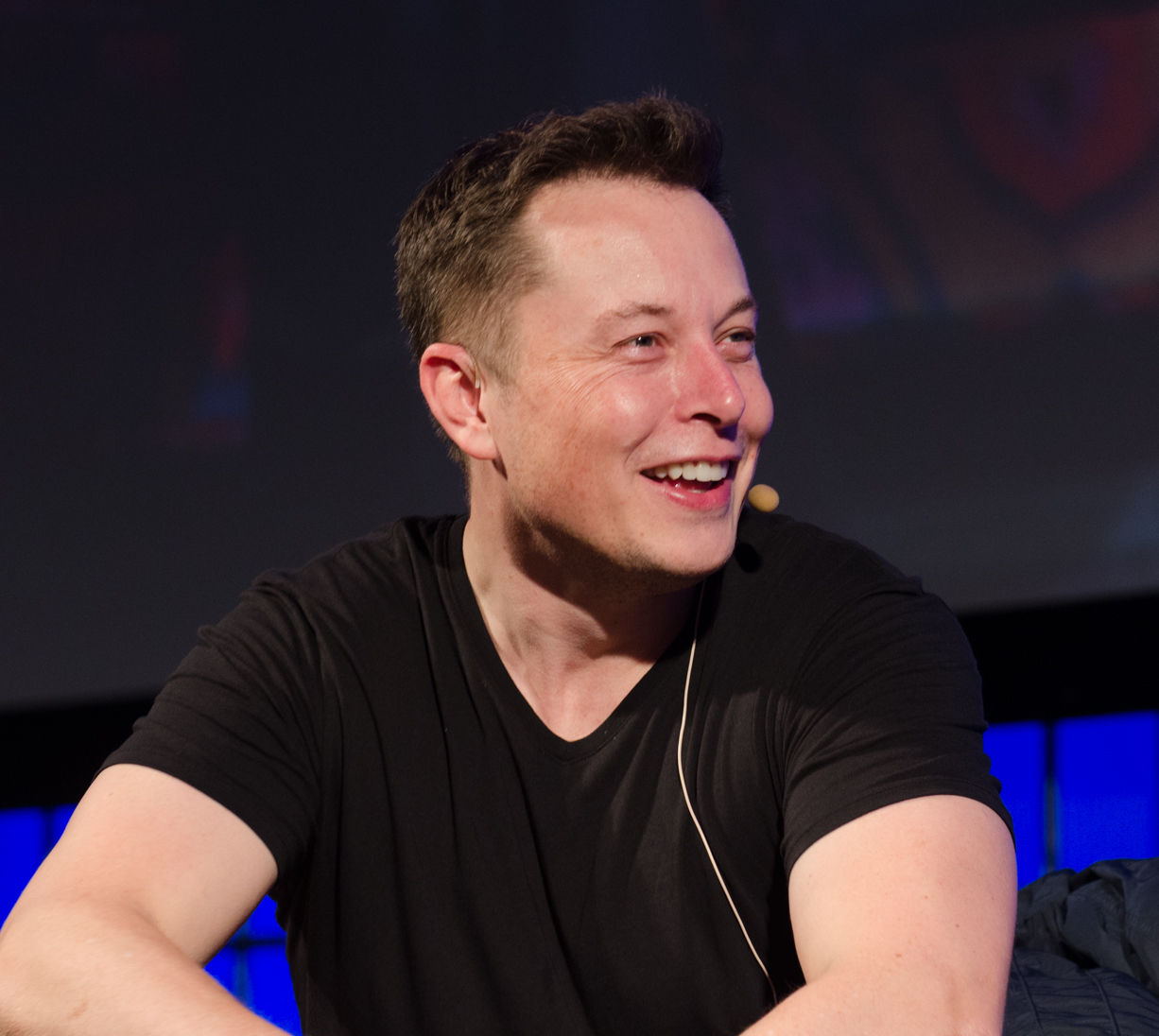
Elon Musk, co-founder and CEO of PayPal, CEO of Tesla Motors, CEO and CTO of SpaceX, co-founder of OpenAI, chairman of SolarCity, executive chairman and CTO of X (formerly Twitter), and founder and CEO of xAI earned a Bachelor of Science in economics from Wharton.

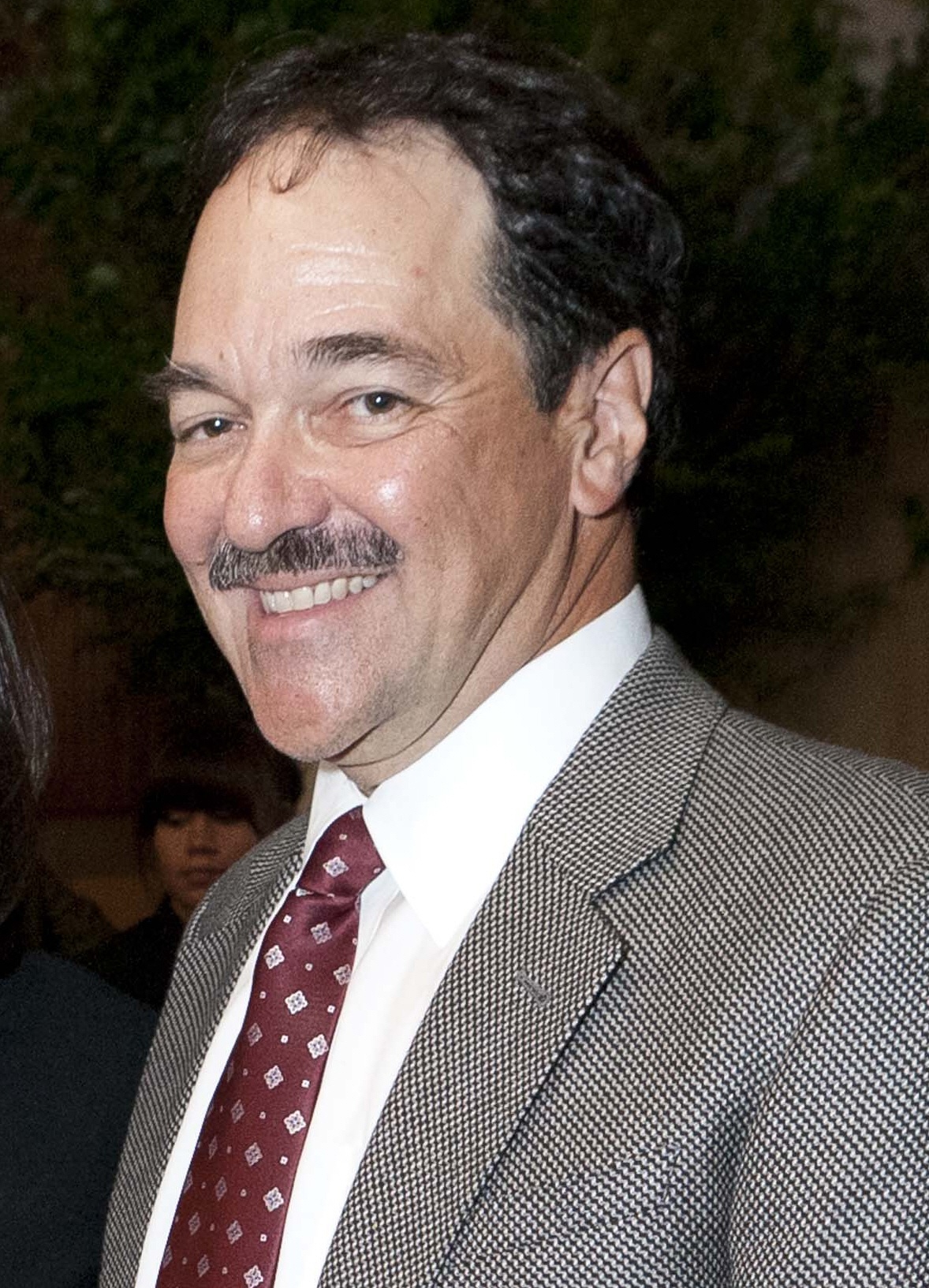
Frank Quattrone, founder of the technology groups at Morgan Stanley, Deutsche Bank, and Credit Suisse, and founder of Qatalyst Partners, earned a Bachelor of Science in economics from Wharton

Donald Trump, businessman, television personality, and 45th and 47th President of the United States

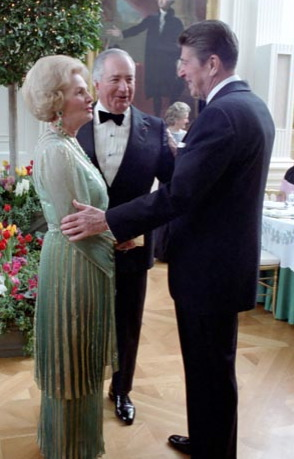
Publisher Walter Annenberg and Lenore Annenberg with President Ronald Reagan in 1981

== Academia ==
Name	Class year(s)	Degree(s)	Notability	Reference
Baidyanath Misra	1952	AM	former vice-chancellor of the Odisha University of Agriculture and Technology; chairman of Odisha State Planning Board; chairman of Odisha's First State Finance Commission	
William Frederick Boulding	1986	PhD	Dean of the Fuqua School of Business at Duke University	
Mark Burstein		MBA	Academic administrator at Lawrence University	
Patrick Chovanec			Business professor at Tsinghua University	
Amos Eiran			President of the University of Haifa, Israel	
Patrick T. Harker			President of the Federal Reserve Bank of Philadelphia (2015-); former dean of the Wharton School (1999-2007)	
Ramchandran Jaikumar			Daewoo Professor of Business Administration at the Harvard Business School	
Matin Ahmed Khan			Dean and director, Institute of Business Administration, Karachi, 1972–77	
Jay Penske			Board of directors of the Entrepreneurial School at the Wharton School	
Steve Salbu			Dean emeritus of the Scheller College of Business at the Georgia Institute of Technology, 2006–2014	
Louis B. Schwartz			Law professor at the University of Pennsylvania Law School	
Benn Steil			Economist and writer; senior fellow and director of international economics at the Council on Foreign Relations; founder and editor of the journal International Finance	
Nassim Nicholas Taleb	1983	MBA	Researcher in risk and uncertainty, originator of the Black Swan theory; author of the Incerto.	
George Taylor			Considered the "father of American arbitration," Department of Labor Hall of Honor inductee; namesake of the Taylor Law	
Adlai Wertman			Professor of clinical management and organization, USC Marshall School of Business	
Mohammad Uzair			Dean and director, Institute of Business Administration, Karachi	
John Quelch			Dean, London Business School	

== Business, industry, and finance ==
=== Business and industry ===
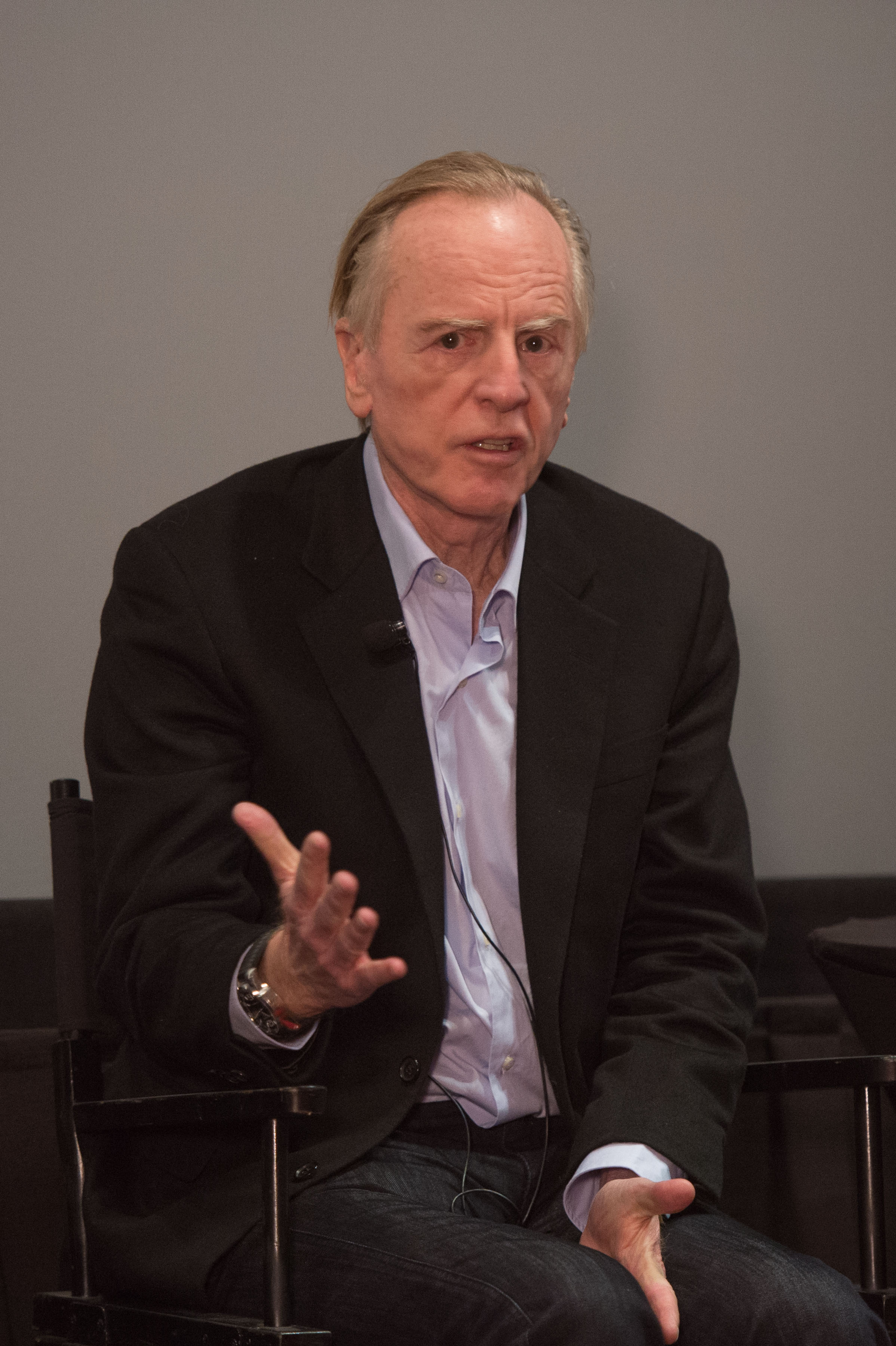
John Sculley, president of PepsiCo (1977–1983), CEO of Apple (1983–1993), partner at Sculley Brothers, LLC (1995–present), co-founder of Zeta Interactive (2007–present)

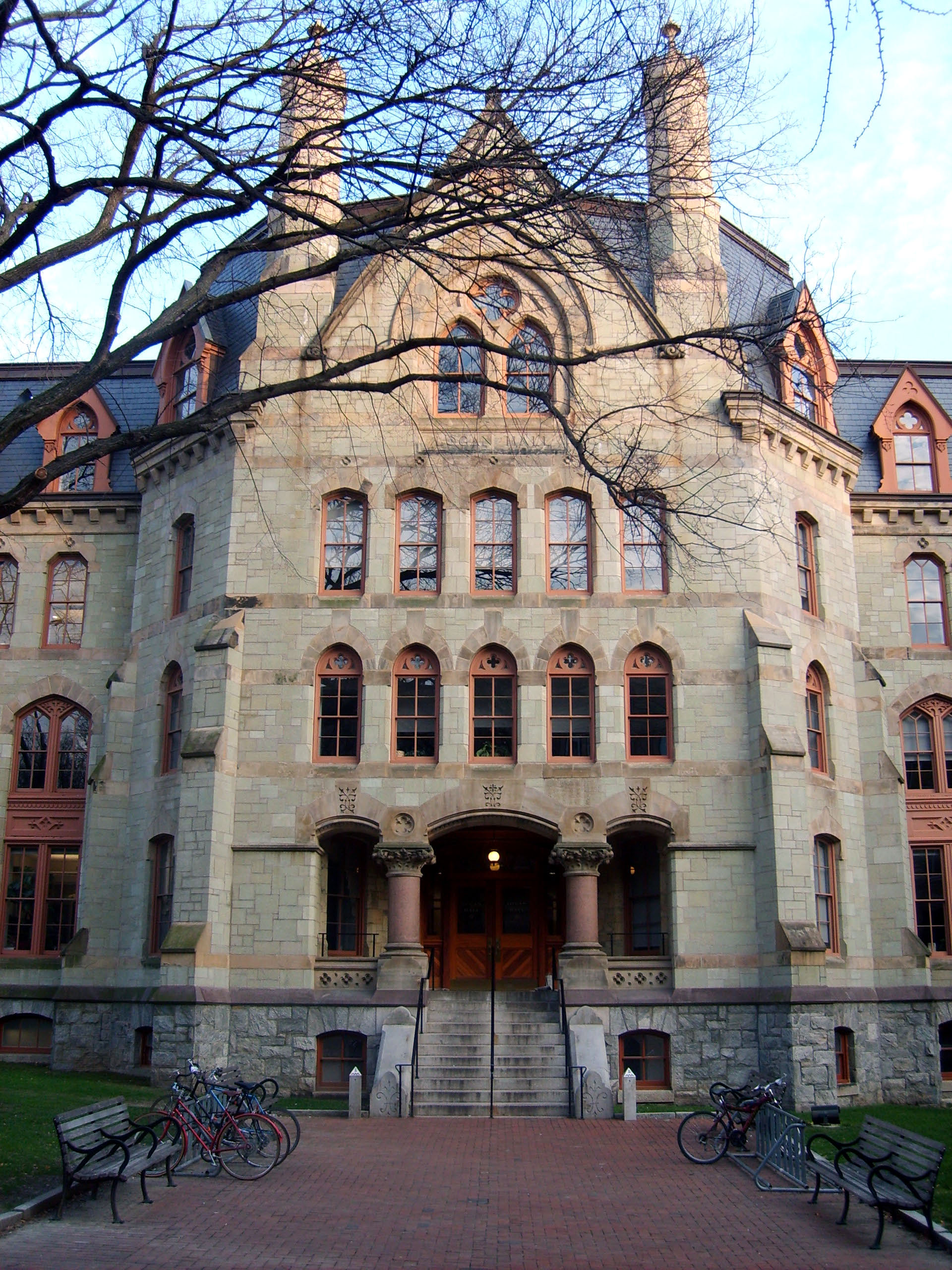
Cohen Hall, formerly named Logan Hall, served as the previous home of the Wharton School.

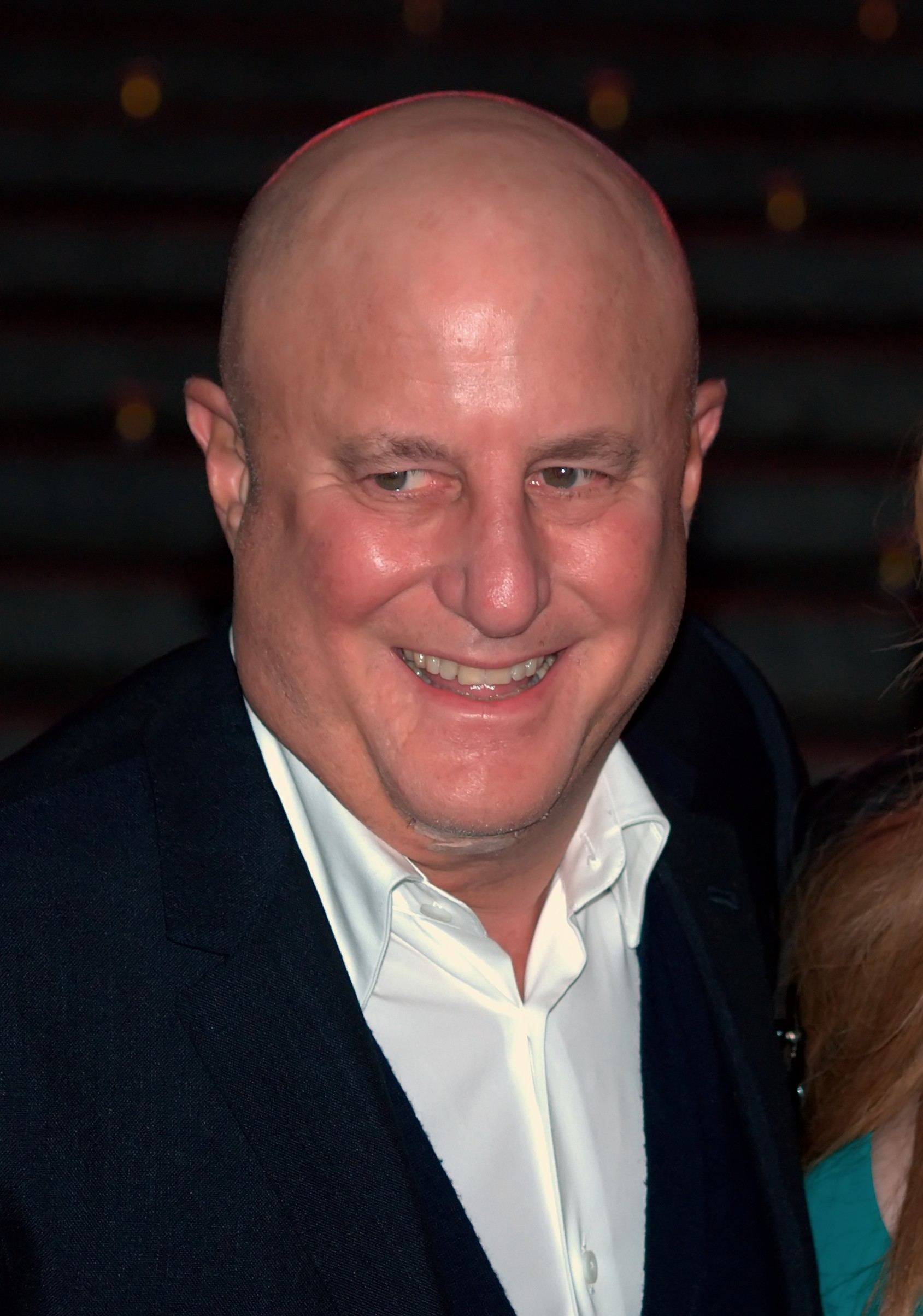
Ronald Perelman, chairman and CEO of MacAndrews & Forbes Group, earned a Bachelor of Science in economics from Wharton.

Name	Class year(s)	Degree(s)	Notability	Reference
Laurent Adamowicz			French entrepreneur; lecturer; author; public health advocate	
Anil Ambani	1983	MBA	Chairman of Reliance Group	
Ayman Asfari			British-Syrian billionaire; CEO of Petrofac	
Beth Axelrod			Vice-president of Employee Experience at Airbnb	
Victor Barnett	1954	BS	Former chairman of Burberry	
Norman Blackwell	1975	MBA	Former chairman of Interserve	
Jeff Blau	1992	MBA	CEO of Related Companies	
Mitchell J. Blutt	1987	MBA	CEO of Consonance Capital	
George Bradt	1985	MBA	Founder and chairman of PrimeGenesis; CEO of J.D. Power's Power Information Network	
John Browett			British businessman; former chief executive of the Dunelm Group and Monsoon Accessorize; senior vice-president of retail at Apple Inc.	
Rosalind Brewer			COO of Starbucks, former president and CEO of Sam's Club	
Charles Butt			Chairman and CEO of H-E-B	
Safra Cata	1983	BS	Former CEO of Oracle Corporation	
Vikram Chatwal	1994	BS	Hotelier	
Bill Chisholm		MBA	CIO of Symphony Technology Group; Owner of the Boston Celtics	
Arthur D. Collins Jr.			Former chairman and CEO of Medtronic	
Anthony Connelly			President and CEO of Disney Cruise Line	
Robert Crandall	1960	MBA	Chairman and CEO of American Airlines	
William J. DeLaney III			CEO of Sysco	
Donny Deutsch	1979	BS	Chairman and CEO of Deutsch NY and DHL	
Michael DiCandilo	1982	BS	CFO and EVP of AmerisourceBergen	
José Aurélio Drummond Jr.			Brazilian businessman; CEO of BRF S.A.	
Dominique Heriard Dubreuil			CEO of Rémy Cointreau	
Mike Eskew			Chairman and CEO of UPS	
John L. Flannery			Chairman and CEO of General Electric Company	
Samuel S. Fleisher			Manufacturer, art patron, and philanthropist	
Rakesh Gangwal	1979	MBA	Chairman and CEO of US Airways	
Robert B. Goergen	1962	MBA	Founder, chairman and CEO of Blyth	
Chip Goodyear			CEO of BHP Billiton	
Alex Gorsky	1996	MBA	CEO of Johnson & Johnson	
Gary Gottlieb			M.D., M.B.A., former president and CEO of Partners HealthCare	
Nilesh Gupta			Managing director of Lupin Limited	
Adam Jay Harrison			defense industry entrepreneur and innovator	
C. Robert Henrikson			Chairman, president and CEO of MetLife	
Jon Huntsman Sr.	1959	BS	Founder, chairman and CEO of Huntsman Corporation	
Charlie Javice			Founder and CEO of Frank	
Reginald H. Jones	1939	BS	Former chairman and CEO of General Electric	
Richard Kahn			Marketing executive	
Jay I. Kislak			Philanthropist and businessman	
Anne Sceia Klein			Businesswoman and communications specialist	
Gerard Kleisterlee			Former CEO and president of Philips	
Yotaro Kobayashi			Chairman and co-CEO of Fuji Xerox	
Chester Koo			Taiwanese businessman	
Leslie Koo			Taiwanese businessman	
Anil Kumar			Management consultant who pled guilty to insider trading	
Leonard Lauder	1954	BS	CEO and chairman of Estée Lauder	
Jeffrey Alfred Legum			President and CEO of The Park Circle Motor Company	
Joey Levin			CEO of IAC	
Edward J. Lewis			Chairman and CEO of Oxford Development Company	
Matthew Mellon			Businessman, former chairman of the New York Republican State Committee’s finance committee	
Alan B. Miller			Founder and CEO of Universal Health Services	
Aditya Mittal			President and CFO of ArcelorMittal	
Christian Ngan			Cameroonian businessman, entrepreneur and owner of Adlyn Holdings and the Madlyn Cazalis Group	
Phebe Novakovic			Chairman and CEO of General Dynamics	
Manuel Pangilinan			Chairman and CEO of First Pacific	
Terren Peizer			Businessperson convicted of insider trading and securities fraud	
Manuel V. Pangilinan			President and CEO of Philippine Telephone Company	
Nelson Peltz			CEO of Triarc Companies (Snapple, Arby's, TJ Cinnamon and Pasta Connection)	
Jeffrey E. Perelman			Businessman; philanthropist; founder, chairman and CEO of JEP Management	
Raymond G. Perelman			Businessman; philanthropist; founder, chairman and CEO of RGP Holdings	
Ronald O. Perelman			Chairman and CEO of MacAndrews & Forbes Group	
Lewis E. Platt	1966	MBA	Chairman and CEO of Boeing	
Ruth Porat	1987	MBA	President and Chief Investment Officer, Alphabet, Inc. and Google, former CFO, Morgan Stanley	
J.D. Power III			Founder of marketing research firm J.D. Power and Associates	
Edmund T. Pratt Jr.			CEO and chairman emeritus, Pfizer	
Sashi Reddi			Entrepreneur; venture capitalist; technologist; philanthropist	
Tracy A. Robinson		MBA	CEO of Canadian National Railway	
Pete Rummell	1971	MBA	Former chairman and CEO of Walt Disney Imagineering and St. Joe Company	
John Sculley	1963	MBA	CEO of Pepsi	
Joseph Segel			Founder of over 20 companies, most notably QVC and Franklin Mint	
Toots Shor			New York City restaurateur	
Peter A. Smith			British businessman; director of Rothschild & Co; former chairman of Savills	
A.J. Steigman			Founder and CEO of Steignet	
Herbert D. Strauss			CEO and chairman of Grey Advertising Agency	
Jeffrey Sutton		BS	President of Wharton Properties	
Anderson Tanoto			Director of Royal Golden Eagle (RGE) manufacturing conglomerate; philanthropist	
Nicholas F. Taubman			CEO and chairman of Advance Auto Parts	
James S. Tisch	1976	MBA	CEO of Loews Corporation	
Mark Wales			Founder of Kill Katpture	
Jacob Wallenberg	1980, 1981	BS, MBA	Banker, industrialist of the Swedish Wallenberg family	
Stuart Weitzman			Founder and CEO of Stuart Weitzman	
Gary L. Wilson			Chairman and CEO of Northwest Airlines	
William Wrigley Jr.			Founder and CEO of Wrigley Company	
Klaus Zumwinkel			Former chairman and CEO of Deutsche Post	
Papa Madiaw Ndiaye			Chairman at Ecobank Transnational Inc	
David Siegel		BA, MBA	Former CEO of Investopedia and Meetup	

=== Finance ===
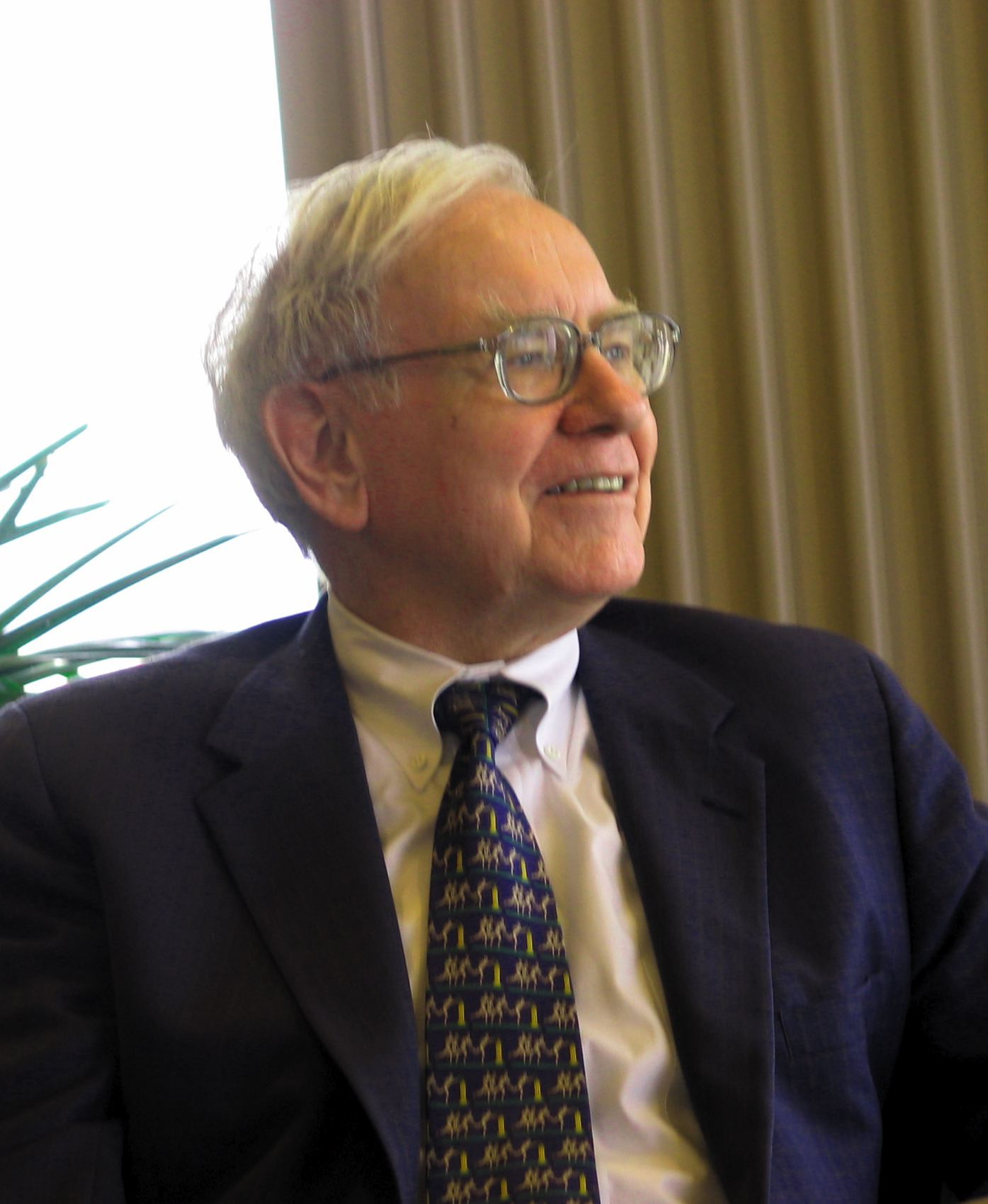
Warren Buffett enrolled in Wharton's undergraduate program in 1947 and dropped out in 1949.

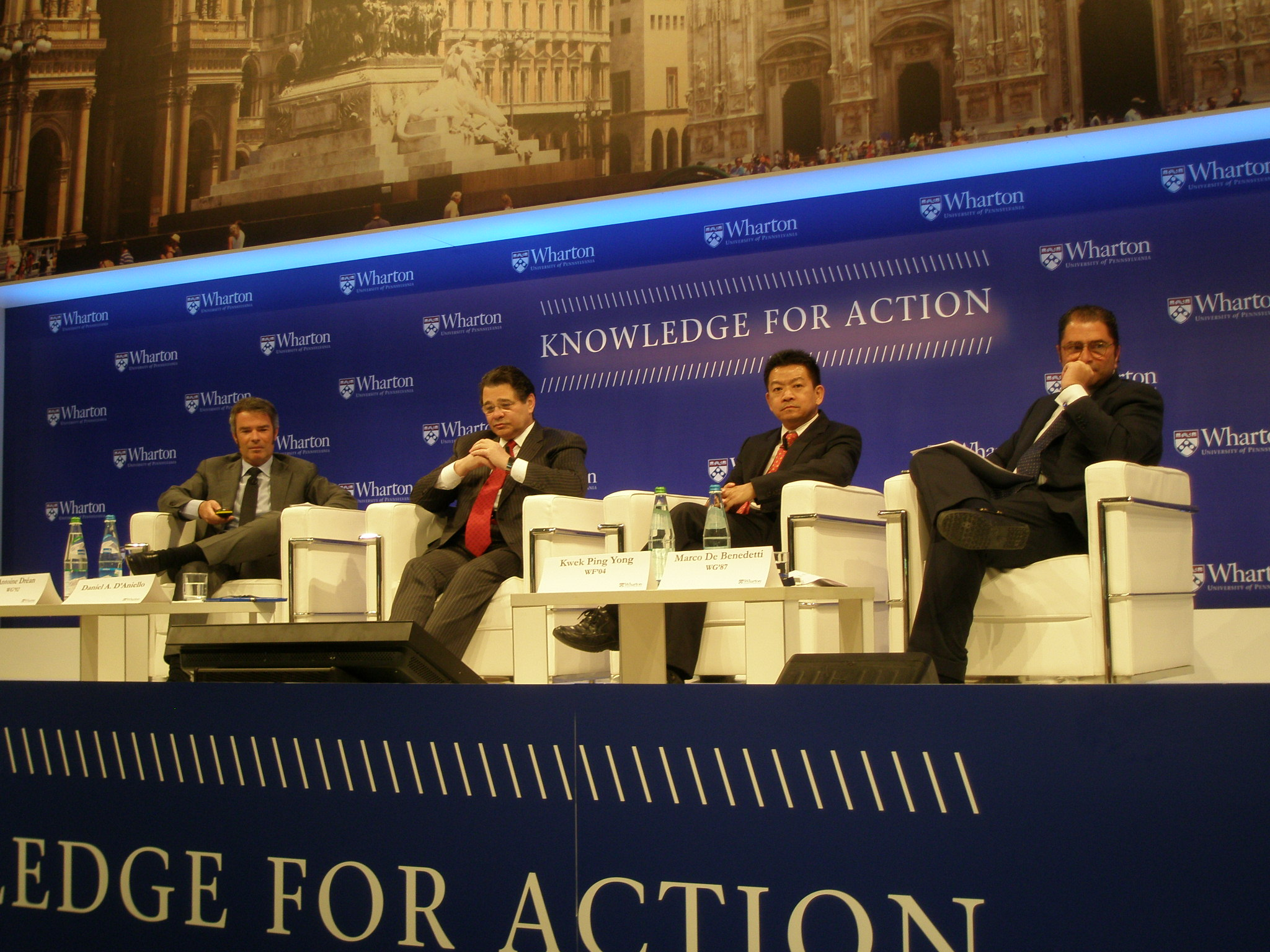
Private equity CEOs, all Wharton alumni, at the Wharton Global Alumni Forum in Milan, Italy

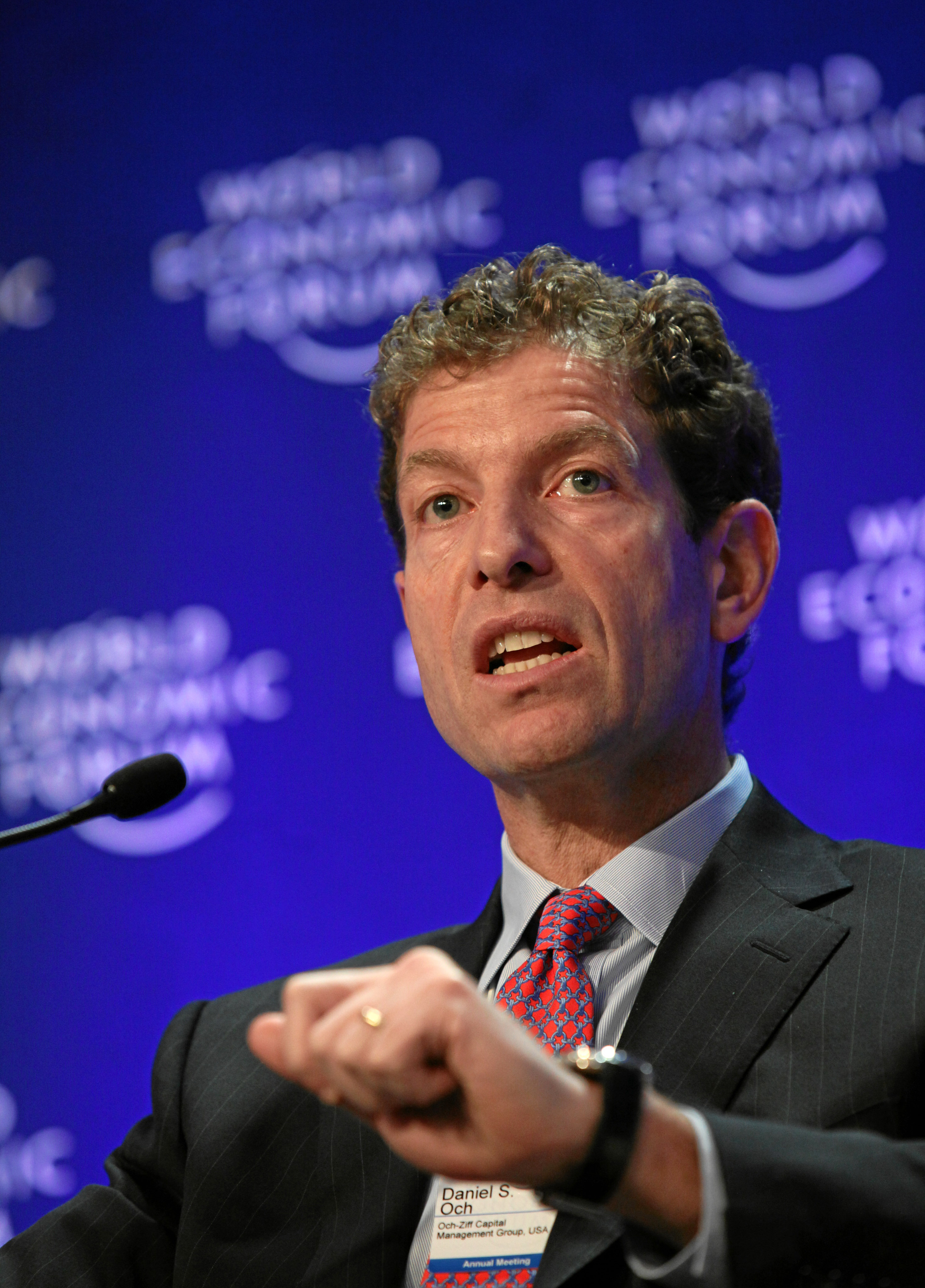
Daniel Och, founder of Och-Ziff Capital Management, earned a Bachelor of Science in Economics from Wharton.

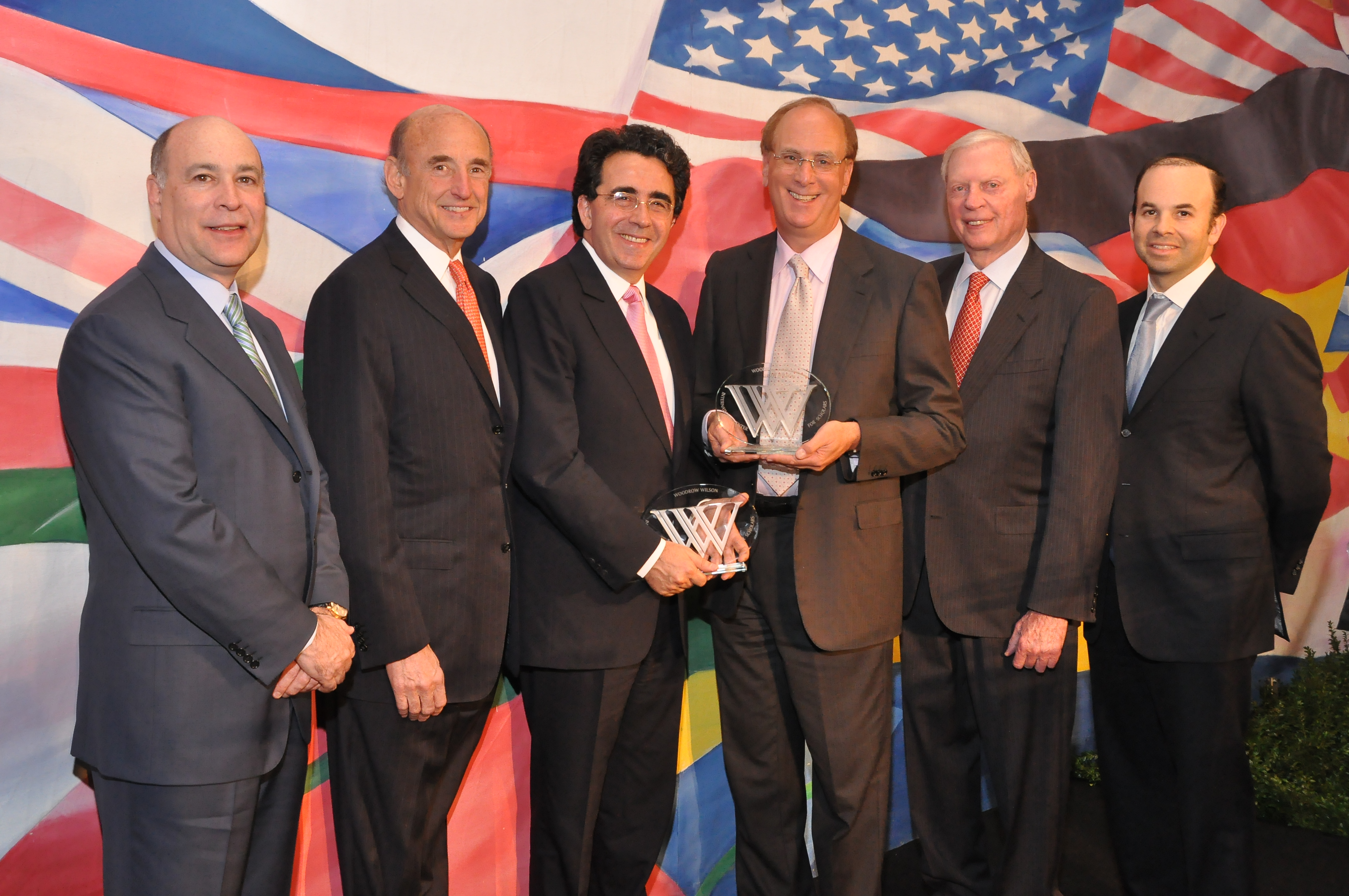
Robert S. Kapito (far left), founder and president of BlackRock, earned a Bachelor of Science in economics from Wharton.

Name	Class year(s)	Degree(s)	Notability	Reference
Nicolas Aguzin			CEO of the Hong Kong Exchanges and Clearing	
Zeti Akhtar Aziz			Governor of Bank Negara Malaysia, the Central Bank of Malaysia	
Tom Bayer			Member of the board of directors of the Reserve Bank of Vanuatu	
Alfred Berkeley			Former president and vice-chairman of the NASDAQ Stock Market, Inc.	
David Blitzer	1991		Senior Blackstone executive, co-founder of Harris Blitzer Sports & Entertainment	
Mitchell J. Blutt			Founder and chairman of Consonance Capital	
Warren Buffett			CEO of Berkshire Hathaway	
Steven A. Cohen			Founder of SAC Capital Advisors	
Jamie Dinan			Investor and founder of York Capital Management	
William P. Egan			Founding partner of Alta Communications, founding partner of Marion Equity Partners	
Catherine Austin Fitts			Managing member, Solari Advisors	
Dawn Fitzpatrick			Global head of Equities, Multi-Asset for O'Connor at UBS Asset Management	
Fred Fraenkel			Vice-chairman of Cowen Group	
Bradley Fried			Chairman of Goldman Sachs international	
Marcos Galperin			Founder and CEO of Mercado Libre	
Ashish Goyal			First visually impaired trader in the world	
Leonard I. Green			Founding partner of Leonard Green & Partners	
Josh Harris	1986	Economics	Co-founder of Apollo Global Management and owner of the NBA's Philadelphia 76ers, the NHL's New Jersey Devils, and the NFL's Washington Commanders	
Vernon Hill			Founder, chairman and CEO of Commerce Bank	
Henry Jackson			Founder and CEO of Merchant Equity Partners	
Robert S. Kapito			Founder and president of BlackRock	
Rodger Krouse				
Vivek Kulkarni			Founder of Brickwork Ratings	
Vikram Limaye			Managing Director and CEO of the National Stock Exchange of India Limited	
Alexander Lloyd			Venture capitalist	
Adriano B. Lucatelli			Swiss manager and businessperson	
Peter Lynch			Former Fidelity Investments Magellan Fund manager; chairman of the Lynch Foundation; author	
William E. Macaulay			CEO and chairman of First Reserve Corporation	
Howard Marks			Founder of Oaktree Capital	
Harold W. McGraw III			Chairman and CEO of McGraw-Hill Financial	
Michael Milken			Inventor of the high-yield bond market; convicted of securities reporting violations and permanently barred from the securities industry	
Yuri Milner			Founder of DST Global and Breakthrough Prize Foundation	
Ken Moelis			Founder of Moelis & Company	
Michael Moritz			Sequoia Capital	
John Neff			Chairman of Wellington Management	
Daniel Och			Founder of Och-Ziff Capital Management	
Stephen M. Peck			Philanthropist and co-founder of Weiss, Peck & Greer	
Douglas L. Peterson			CEO of S&P Global	
Raj Rajaratnam			Hedge fund CEO of Galleon Group; convicted of insider trading	
Larry Robbins			Founder of Glenview Capital Management	
Eileen Clarkin Rominger			CIO of Goldman Sachs Asset Management	
Barry Rosenstein			Hedge fund manager	
Jacqui Safra			Swiss investor, owner of Encyclopædia Britannica and Merriam-Webster	
Jean Salata			Founder of BPEA EQT	
Durreen Shahnaz			Founder of Impact Investment Exchange (IIX)	
Michael Steinhardt			Founder of Steinhardt, Fine, Berkowitz and Company	
Paul Wachter			Businessman and investment advisor	
Jacob Wallenberg			Chairman of Investor AB	
Dawne Williams			Former CEO of St. Kitts-Nevis-Anguilla National Bank	
Alan Wilzig			Entrepreneur and investor	
Robert Wolf			President and CEO of UBS Investment Bank Americas	
Art Wrubel			private equity investor; founder of Wesley Capital Management; minority owner of the Philadelphia 76ers	
Peter Wuffli			Former CEO of UBS AG	
Martin Zweig			Investment advisor, author of Winning on Wall Street	

== Entertainment and arts ==
Name	Class year(s)	Degree(s)	Notability	Reference
Hoodie Allen	2010		Aka Steven Markowitz, hip-hop artist and rapper	
James DePreist	1958	BA	Director and conductor, Oregon Symphony	
Wendy Finerman	1982	BASc	Oscar-winning film producer (Forrest Gump, 1994)	
Moe Jaffe	1923		Songwriter and bandleader	
Aaron Karo			Author; comedian	
Jay Livingston			Oscar-winning composer (The Paleface, 1948; Captain Carey, 1950; and The Man Who Knew Too Much, 1956)	
Mehmet Oz, aka Dr. Oz			Physician, writer, and television personality	
Robert B. Sinclair			Film and theater director	
Clarissa Sligh			Photographer and book artist	
Ty Stiklorius			Emmy Award-winning film and television producer, music executive, and philanthropist	
Kidlat Tahimik			(Eric De Guia), Filipino filmmaker,;National Artist of the Philippines	
Eric Weinberg			Television screenwriter and producer	
Ryan Brant			Founder of Take-Two Interactive, which owns publishing labels Rockstar Games and 2K (company). and has a video game portfolio including the Grand Theft Auto (GTA) franchise	
Rick Yune			Actor; screenwriter; producer; martial artist	
Noah Schnapp			Actor	

== Media ==
Name	Class year(s)	Degree(s)	Notability	Reference
Walter Annenberg			Publisher; founder and CEO of Triangle Publications	
Jim Bankoff			Chairman and chief executive officer of Vox Media	
Julian A. Brodsky			Founder, chairman and CEO of Comcast Corporation	
Donny Deutsch			Chairman of Deutsch, Inc.; host of CNBC's The Big Idea with Donny Deutsch	
Lindsay Gardner			Media executive; Layer3 TV chief content officer; Democratic Party strategist and fundraiser	
Laura Lang			Former CEO of Time, Inc.	
Gerald Lestz			Columnist; author; publisher; founder of the Demuth Museum	
Warren Lieberfarb			CEO and president of Warner Home Video	
William S. Paley			Founder of Columbia Broadcasting System (CBS)	
Brian L. Roberts			Chairman and CEO of Comcast Corporation	
Laurence Tisch	1943	MBA	Former CEO of CBS	
Cenk Uygur			Radio talk show host (The Young Turks and Air America Radio); The Huffington Post columnist	
Mortimer Zuckerman	1961	MBA	Chairman and editor-in-chief of U.S. News & World Report	

== Nonprofit and advocacy ==
Name	Class year(s)	Degree(s)	Notability	Reference
Edwin Feulner			President of American Heritage Foundation	
Jonathan Fielding			Former chairman of Truth Campaign, director of Public Health for Los Angeles County, Philanthropist, professor, UCLA School of Public Health	
Alfred Irving Hallowell			President of the American Anthropological Association	
Laurene Powell Jobs			Founder and chair of Emerson Collective	
Paul Judge			Chairman of the British Royal Society of Arts, founder of the Judge Business School at Cambridge University	
James Martin			Jesuit priest and writer	
Risa Lavizzo-Mourey			President and CEO of Robert Wood Johnson Foundation (2003-2017)	
Lawrence Lessig			Founder and director of Harvard Berkman Center for Internet & Society	
Richard Stearns			President of World Vision	
William J. Trent			Executive director of the United Negro College Fund (1944–1964)	
Charles Wall			Resident superintendent of George Washington's estate at Mount Vernon for 39 years, starting in 1937	

== Politics and government ==
=== Politics ===
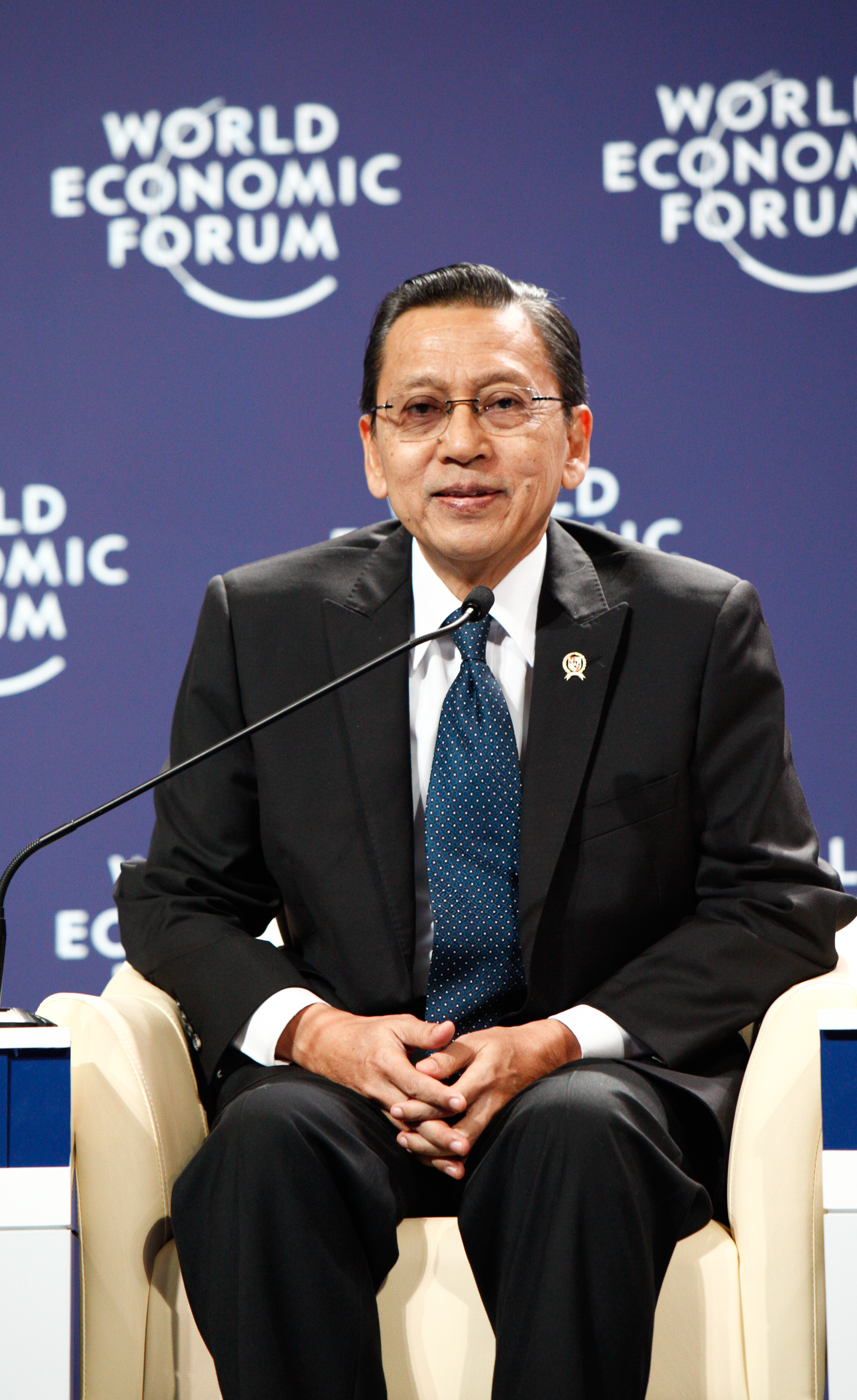
Boediono, vice president (2009-2014), Minister for the Economy (2005-2009), Minister of Finance (2001-2005), Indonesia

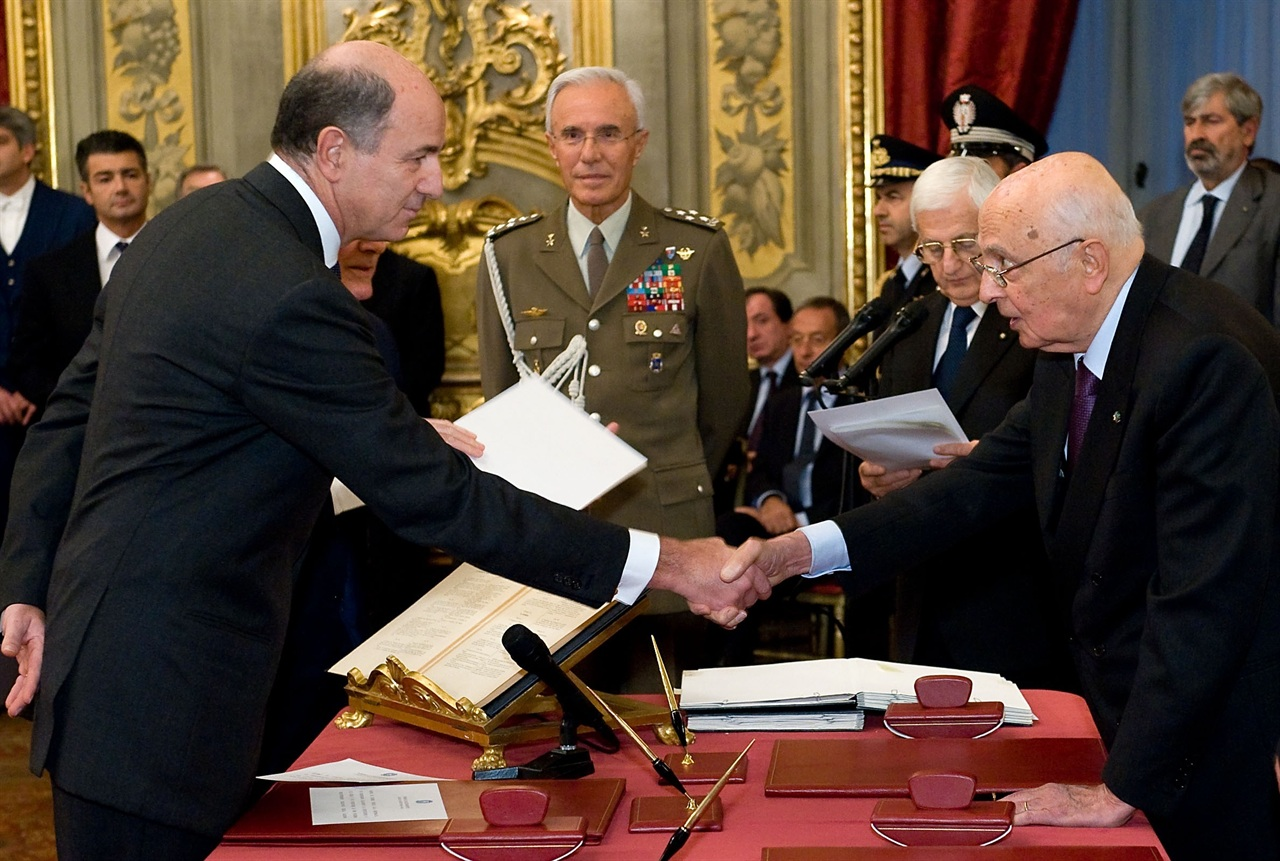
Corrado Passera, Minister of Economic Development, Infrastructure and Transport, Italy

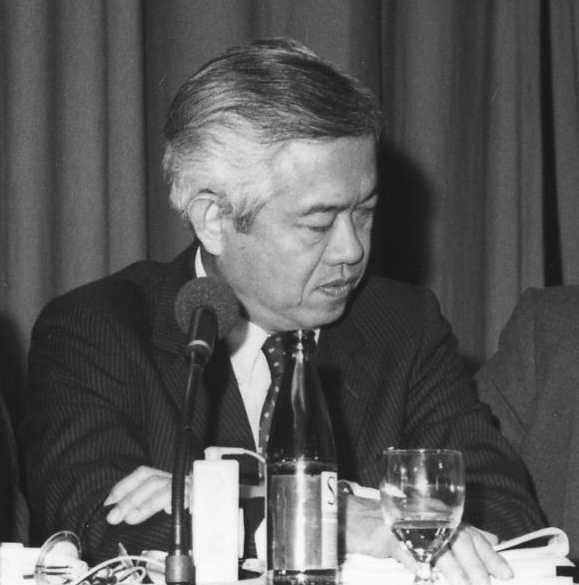
Cesar Virata, Prime Minister (1981–1986), Minister of Finance (1970–1986), Philippines

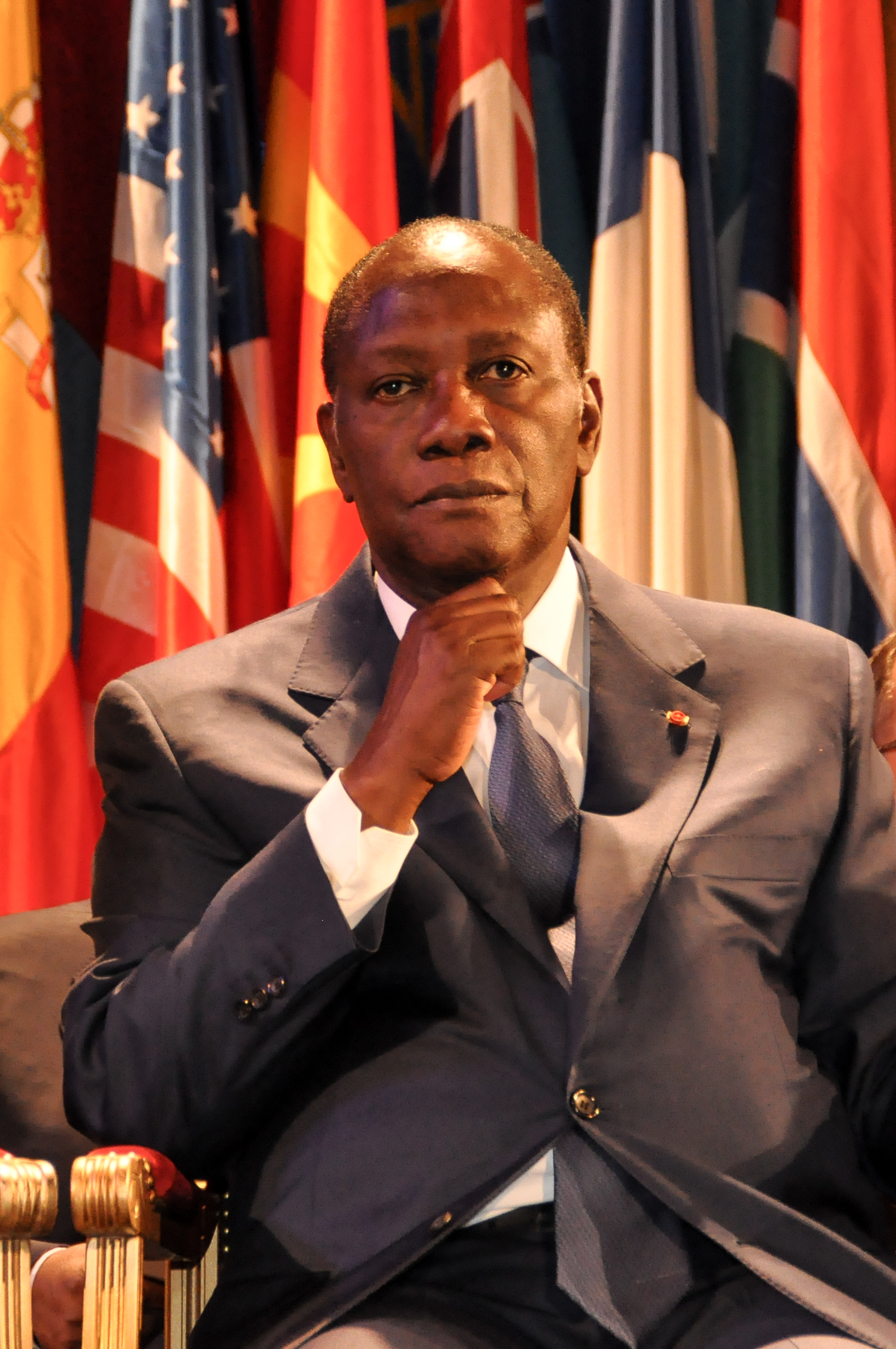
Alassane Ouattara, president of the Ivory Coast (2010-present), governor of the Central Bank of West African States, deputy head of the International Monetary Fund

Name	Class year(s)	Degree(s)	Notability	Reference
Robert B. Asher			Politician and businessman. Co-chairman of the board of directors of Asher's Chocolates in Pennsylvania and Pennsylvania's committeeman on the Republican National Committee	
Ernesto Pérez Balladares			President of Panama (1994-1999)	
David Campbell Bannerman			Conservative Member of the European Parliament for the East of England	
Louis A. Bloom			Pennsylvania State Representative for Delaware County (1947–1952), Judge Pennsylvania Court of Common Pleas for Delaware County	
Boediono			Vice president (2009–2014), Minister for the Economy (2005–2009), Minister of Finance (2001–2005), Governor of Bank Indonesia, the Central Bank of Indonesia	
Robert Brooks			Member of the Pennsylvania House of Representatives (2018-)	
Sila María González Calderón			Puerto Rican senator (2005-2013); former First Lady (2001-2005)	
Andy Carter			British Conservative Member of Parliament for Warrington South	
Bill Cobey			Former U.S. representative from North Carolina's 4th congressional district (1985-1987); director of the Jesse Helms Center	
Zehnder Confair			Pennsylvania State Senator	
Moonis Elahi			Pakistani businessman and politician	
Edwin Feulner		MBA	Co-founder and former president of The Heritage Foundation	
Kate Gallego	2012	MBA	Mayor of Phoenix (2019-)	
John J. Hafer	1954	BS	Former Maryland state senator (1991-2007)	
Ron Huldai			Mayor of Tel Aviv (1998-)	
Ahsan Iqbal	1986	MBA	Pakistani Minister for Interior (2017-2018)	
Waleed Iqbal			Pakistani senator from Punjab; chairperson of the Pakistan Senate Committee for Defense; partner at Lexium Law; law professor	
Ted Kaufman			U.S. Senator from Delaware (2009-2010)	
Peter Lorange			President of IMD (Switzerland)	
Mauricio Macri			Former mayor of Buenos Aires City and president of Argentina	
Bongbong Marcos		Did not graduate	President of the Philippines	
John W. Murphy			U.S. Congressman from Pennsylvania (1943-1946)	
Philip D. Murphy			U.S. Ambassador to Germany (2009-2013); current and 56th governor of New Jersey (2018–present)	
Michael Nutter			Mayor of Philadelphia (2008–2015)	
Peter O'Donnell			Texas state Republican chairman (1962-1969); Dallas investor and philanthropist	
Alassane Dramane Ouattara			President (2010–present), Ivory Coast; governor of the Central Bank of West African States; Deputy Head of the International Monetary Fund	
Douglas Peters			Canadian economist and politician	
Sachin Pilot			Indian politician	
Mar Roxas			Member of the House of Representatives (1993–2000), senator (2004–2010), Secretary of Trade and Industry (2000–2003), Secretary of Transportation and Communications (2011–2012) and Secretary of Interior and Local Government (2012–2015) in the Philippines	
Francisco Sagasti			President of Peru (2020-2021)	
David Scott			US Congressman from Georgia	
Maxwell E. Seidman			Lawyer and Democratic politician	
Nao Takasugi			California State Assembly and mayor of Oxnard, California	
Donald Trump	1968	BS	45th and 47th President of the United States (2017-2021, 2025–present)	
Rexford Tugwell			Governor of Puerto Rico (1941-1946),	
Ashwini Vaishnaw			Indian Politician and Current Minister of Railways and Minister of IT and Communications	
Mark Villar			Senator of the Philippines (2022–present), Secretary of Public Works and Highways (2016-2021), member of the House of Representatives from Las Pinas (2010-2016)	
Cesar Virata	1953	MBA	Prime Minister (1981–1986) and Secretary of Finance (1970–1986) of the Philippines	
John H. Ware III			U.S. Congressman for Pennsylvania	
Bob Ziegelbauer			Wisconsin politician	

=== Government ===
Name	Class year(s)	Degree(s)	Notability	Reference
Roni Alsheikh			Israeli intelligence officer and head of the Israel Police	
Armand Arreza			Former administrator and CEO of the Subic Bay Metropolitan Authority	
Andrew M. Bradley			Pennsylvania Secretary of Property and Supplies (1957–1960)	
William J. Brennan Jr.			Associate justice, US Supreme Court (1956-1990)	
Herbert B. Cohen			Judge	
Ron Dermer			Israeli ambassador to the United States (2013-2021)	
Pridiyathorn Devakula			Governor of the Central Bank of Thailand	
Gary Gensler	1978, 1979	BS, MBA	Chair of Securities and Exchange Commission; former chairman of the US Commodity Futures Trading Commission	
Ronald M. Gould			Judge for the United States Circuit Court of Appeals for the 9th Circuit	
Isabella Casillas Guzman			Director of the Small Business Administration	
Neel Kashkari	2002	MBA	President of the Federal Reserve Bank of Minneapolis (2016-)	
Ann McLaughlin Korologos			Former U.S. Labor Secretary (1987-1989); Former Chair of the Aspen Institute	
Frank Lavin	1996	MBA	Former Under Secretary of Commerce for International Trade; former United States Ambassador to Singapore (2001-2005)	
Reggie Love	2012	MBA	Former body man for President Barack Obama	
Cardozo M. Luna			Undersecretary of Department of National Defense (2016-); former Philippine Ambassador to the Netherlands(2009-2010); former vice chief of staff and lieutenant general of the Armed Forces of the Philippines	
Winnie Monsod			Former director-general of National Economic and Development Authority of the Philippines; former member of the UN Committee for Development Planning (UNCDP) from 1987 to 2000; former member of the board of trustees of the International Food Policy Research Institute (IFPRI)	
Corrado Passera	1980	MBA	Former CEO of Banca Intesa of Italy; Italian Minister of Economic Development, Infrastructure and Transport	
Frances Perkins			Former U.S. Secretary of Labor (1933-1945), first female U.S. Presidential Cabinet Member, and architect of Social Security system	
Russell Redenbaugh			Member of the United States Civil Rights Commission (1990–2005)	
Eli Rosenbaum			Director of Office of Special Investigations (United States Department of Justice)	
Andrew Saul			Chairman of the Federal Retirement Thrift Investment Board, vice-chairman of the Metropolitan Transportation Authority; investor; former owner/CEO of Brooks Brothers	

== Sports ==
Name	Class year(s)	Degree(s)	Notability	Reference
Barney Berlinger			Decathlete and winner of the Sullivan Award	
Robert Castellini	1967	MBA	Owner of the Cincinnati Reds	
Frank Chapot			Olympic equestrian	
Mark DeRosa			Major League Baseball player	
Mark Ein	1987	Economics	Venture capitalist and sports entrepreneur	
Paul Friedberg			Olympic fencer	
Douglas Glanville			Major League Baseball player and analyst	
Austin Gunsel			Football executive and FBI agent	
Erik Lorig			NFL football tight end and fullback	
Bruce Manson			Tennis player	
Stephanie McCaffrey			Former NWSL and USWNT soccer player	
Ugonna Onyekwe			Former professional basketball player	
Yoav Saffar			Basketball player	
Andrew Towne			Member of the team that completed the first human-powered transit of the Drake Passage	
Justin Tuck	2018	MBA	New York Giants defensive end	
Sam Mattis			Olympic discus thrower	
Jim Crocicchia		Economics	New York Giants quarterback	

== Technology ==
Name	Class year(s)	Degree(s)	Notability	Reference
Selorm Adadevoh			Chief Executive Officer of MTN Ghana, a subsidiary of MTN Group	
Bill Conner			CEO of SonicWall	
Mandy Ginsberg			CEO of Match Group	
Sam Hamadeh			Founder of Vault.com Inc.	
Steve Ives			Information technology entrepreneur	
Mark D. Kingdon			CEO of Linden Lab, parent company of Second Life	
Josh Kopelman			Founder of Half.com	
Curtis Lee			Founder and CEO of Luxe	
Marc Lore			Founder and CEO of Jet.com, acquired by Walmart for $3.3 billion in August 2016	
Gayle Laakmann McDowell			Founder; coder; speaker; author of Cracking the Coding Interview	
Elon Musk	1997	BS	Co-founder and ex-CEO of PayPal, founder, CEO and CTO of SpaceX, co-founder of OpenAI, chairman of SolarCity, executive chairman and CTO of X (formerly Twitter), founder and CEO of xAI, CEO and Product Architect of Tesla Motors	
Ben Nelson			CEO of Snapfish	
Peter M. Nicholas			Founder, CEO and chairman of Boston Scientific	
Sundar Pichai	2002	MBA	CEO of Alphabet and Google	
Mark Pincus			Founder of Zynga	
Philip Johnston	2018	MBA	CEO and Co-Founder of Starcloud	
Lewis E. Platt	1966	MBA	Former chairman and CEO of Hewlett-Packard	
Ruth Porat			President chief investment officer of Alphabet, parent company of Google; former CFO of Morgan Stanley	
Frank Quattrone			Founder of the Technology Groups at Morgan Stanley, Deutsche Bank and Credit Suisse; founder of Qatalyst Partners	
Garrett Reisman	1990	BS	NASA astronaut	
Josh Resnick			Founder, CEO and president of Pandemic Studios Inc	
John Sculley	1963	MBA	Former CEO of Apple Inc.	
Ashmeet Sidana			Entrepreneur; venture capitalist	
Brian Stafford			CEO of Diligent Corporation	
James L. Vincent			Chairman and CEO of Biogen Idec	
Nancy Wang			Businesswoman; founder of Advancing Women in Product	
Jeff Weiner			CEO of LinkedIn	
Fred Wilson			Managing partner of Union Square Ventures	

== Authors and journalists ==
Name	Class year(s)	Degree(s)	Notability	Reference
Susan Braudy			Author and journalist	
Nina Godiwalla			Author of Suits: A Woman on Wall Street	
Jerry Mander			Environmentalist and author of Four Arguments for the Elimination of Television	
Matthew E. May			Author	
John D. MacDonald			Author	
Reem Kassis	2010, 2010	BS, MBA	Author of The Palestinian Table	
William A. Reuben			Investigative journalist	
David Vise			Pulitzer Prize winner, Washington Post'	

== Other ==
Name	Class year(s)	Degree(s)	Notability	Reference
Hettie Simmons Love			First African-American to earn an MBA from Wharton, in 1947	
Jho Low			Fugitive sought by authorities in Malaysia, Singapore, and the United States, regarding the 1Malaysia Development Berhad scandal	
Nirav Modi			Businessman, jewellery designer, diamond merchant and fraudster	
Herbert B. Newberg			Class action attorney	
Donald Trump Jr.	2000	BS	Son of Donald Trump, the 45th & 47th President of the United States, and executive vice president of The Trump Organization	
Ivanka Trump	2004	BS	Businesswoman, daughter of Donald Trump, 45th and 47th President of the United States	
John Nolen	1891	PhD	American landscape architect, planning consultant, writer, founding member of the American Institute of Planners	
Elizabeth Ursic		MBA	Theologian, scholar, and author	

== See also ==
- List of University of Pennsylvania people
