= Bradt =

Bradt is a surname. Notable people with the surname include:

- Albert Andriessen Bradt (c. 1607–1686), Norwegian settler
- George Bradt (born 1958), American businessman
- Gordon Bradt (1924–2022), American inventor, designer and founder of Kinetico Studios
- Hilary Bradt (born 1941), English travel writer and founder of Bradt Travel Guides
- Paul Bradt (1904–1978), American rock climber
- Richard C. Bradt (1938–2019), American materials engineer
- Tyler Bradt (born 1986), American kayaker
