= Anne Klein =

Anne Klein or Ann Klein may refer to:

- Ann Klein (1923–1986), American politician
- Anne C. Klein (born 1947), professor of religious studies
- Anne Klein (fashion designer) or Hannah Golofsky (1923–1974), American fashion designer and businesswoman
- Anne Klein (politician) (1950–2011), German lawyer and politician
- Anne Sceia Klein, American businesswoman and communications specialist

== See also ==
- Annie Kline, mining pioneer
- Anna Klein (disambiguation)
