= Steve Ives =

British information technology businessman

- Known for: Founder of Trigenix, Taptu

Steve Ives is a serial entrepreneur in the information technology sector, active in Cambridge, England.

== Biography ==
Ives founded Torus Systems in the 1980s and established Ives & Co. in 1989. He worked as VP Business Development for Qualcomm Europe until mid-2005. He founded Trigenix and social media company Taptu. He is also Chairman of Teamstudio (previously a wholly owned subsidiary of Ives & Co.).

Ives holds a master's degree in biochemistry from the University of Cambridge, and an MBA from Wharton School of the University of Pennsylvania. He is also a Fellow of London's Royal Society of Arts. He has presented at industry events including 3gsm and the GSM Association General Plenary and in 2011 addressed Connected Cambridge's "Entrepreneurs on the Move" networking event.

Steve is now working on Hoverkey, a mobile application security company based in London.
