= Anna Klein =

Anna Klein may refer to:

- Anna Klein (painter) (1883–1941), German painter and designer
- Anna Klein (camp warden) (1900–?), guard at the Ravensbrück concentration camp

== See also ==
- Anne Klein (disambiguation)
