= Diligent Corporation =

American technology company

- Type: Private
- Traded as: NZX: DIL
- Industry: Software as a service
- Founded: 1994; 32 years ago (as Manhattan Creative Partners)
- Founders: Brian Henry; Kiri Borg
- Headquarters: New York City, New York, U.S.
- Area served: Global
- Key people: Brian Stafford (CEO); Avigail Dadone (Chief People Officer); Ron Rogozinski (Chief Financial Officer); Amanda Carty (General Manager, ESG & Data Intelligence)
- Products: Secure modern governance technology solutions
- Services: Corporate software
- Revenue: $600 million (2022)
- Number of employees: 2,185
- Subsidiaries: Diligent Institute
- Website: diligent.com

Diligent Corporation is a software as a service company that enables groups to share and collaborate information for board meetings. Headquartered in New York City, and incorporated in Delaware, the company has offices in Galway, Ireland; London, England; Washington, D.C.; Munich, Germany; Budapest, Hungary; Hong Kong; Bangalore, India; Sydney and Vancouver.

The company's main products are based on a software as a service model and sold by subscription. These include corporate governance technologies, such as a board portal for messaging, and voting tools. Diligent's products are used by 65 percent of all Fortune 1000 companies.

== History ==
Diligent was founded by Brian Henry and Kiri Borg in 1994 as Manhattan Creative Partners (MCP) which consulted and hosted secure websites for financial institutions, mutual funds and insurance companies.

Diligent began developing Boardbook in early 2001, when AIG Sunamerica, requested a secure automation of board documents.

In 2003, Henry and Borg formed Diligent Partners, together with Sharon Daniels, Dan Kiley, Kenneth Carroll, Alessandro Sodi, Marc Daniels and Robert Craig. Manhattan Creative Partners was renamed to Diligent Board Member Services, shifting the services to focus on corporate governance delivery software.

=== Initial public offering ===
Diligent listed on the New Zealand Exchange (NZX) in 2007 with a $24m NZX IPO, valuing the company at $115m. While fundraising for the company was successful, prior to the company listing, some information became public regarding bankruptcies of original founder and CEO Brian Henry and his brother Gerald Henry. These bankruptcies occurred in the late 1980s due to the 1987 share market crash. Gerald Henry was given a jail term for fraud in 1991 due to a subset of US law. Diligent released a statement clarifying that Gerald Henry was not associated with the company.

The day following Diligent's listing, the company announced Henry's resignation as CEO due to the oversight of the disclosure of this information. However, some journalists at the time claimed that Diligent's PR firm and attorneys "should have advised Henry to publicly acknowledge his history." In fact, Diligent's IPO attorney, Mark Russell, said his firm, Buddle Findlay, "was proud to have our brand associated with Diligent and with Brian in particular. We have no concerns whatsoever." It was reported that "Diligent's promoters and directors, including director Mark Russell of law firm Buddle Findlay, knew of Brian's connection with Energycorp, but decided not to disclose. Coincidentally, Russell, in the 1980s, worked for the Bank of New Zealand, which had lent the company $15.5m on a handshake." Henry was replaced by Alessandro Sodi, who was then President. Henry remained on the Board, his value to the company recognised by the other members of the board. Diligent's share price collapsed to $0.14 by March 2009, but later recovered to lead the pack of technology listings.

=== Company growth and revenue restatement issues ===
With the release of the Apple iPad in 2010, Diligent developed an app for this new platform and commenced a period of explosive growth in client numbers. Diligent made its first operating profit in 2012. Between 2011 and 2012, company revenue grew by 165%. By mid-2013, the Diligent stock price had reached over $8.00 NZD a share.

In August 2013, Diligent announced that it would need to restate revenue for the current and preceding three years due to discrepancies in company accounting practices. No fraud was involved, though the company was required to recognize revenue from the date of a contract being signed rather than the start of a month, and its installation fees recognized over a longer period of time. The company also acknowledged that its accounting systems were underdeveloped and required improvement. It was fined by the NZX for a number of minor breaches of listing rules.

Alessandro Sodi stepped down as CEO in 2015 to focus on the launch of Diligent Teams as Chief Product Strategy Officer. Sodi was succeeded by current CEO Brian Stafford, an ex-Mckinsey partner and software-as-a-service specialist.

=== Return to private ownership ===
On 14 February 2016, Diligent announced that it had entered into a definitive agreement to be acquired by Insight Partners for consideration of $4.90 per share, valuing the company at $624M USD, subject to approval from the shareholders. A Shareholder meeting was held in Auckland, NZ on 13 April 2016 and having received 57% votes in favor of the Merger (as it was structured), Diligent de-listed from the NZX and returned into private hands. The merger was opposed by the NZ Shareholders Association who considered the offer too low, stating that "the current offer is low compared to where the company's prospects have been in the past"

Since 2016, Diligent has restructured its leadership team and acquired new companies, including Brainloop, BoardPad, Boardroom Resources and Manzama.

In December 2018, Diligent announced the launch of the Diligent Institute, a think tank aiming to provide customers with global research on governance practices.

=== Modern Leadership Initiative ===
In June 2020, Diligent launched its Modern Leadership Initiative and partnered with more than 20 private equity companies to improve board-level diversity. Each private equity firm agreed to open board seats of five of their portfolio companies to racially diverse candidates. The private equity firms included Insight Partners, Vista Equity Partners, Hellman & Friedman, Hg, Genstar Capital, The Jordan Company, and TA Associates, and also New Mountain Capital, Francisco Partners, Heidrick & Struggles, Egon Zehnder, and the American Investment Council.

== Corporate affairs ==
=== Customer and revenue ===
In 2022, the company reported more than 16,500 customers and 700,000 board members and leaders from more than 130 countries. In 2022, the company reported revenues exceeding $600 million.

== Products ==
Diligent's products are based on a software-as-a-service model and sold by subscription.

=== Board management software ===
Diligent’s board management software platform provides tools to organize board meetings and facilitate collaboration and communication between the board and the leadership team. The platform consists of a board portal, a secure messaging app, a secure file-sharing service, and a voting & resolutions administration tool — supplemented among others by board composition and succession planning, board questionnaires, and governance benchmarking modules. Diligent offers board meeting platforms specially customized for the needs of higher education and K-12 boards, non-profit boards, and state & local government boards. Board management software services are complemented with an entity and subsidiary management platform, compensation and governance intel tools, and equity and cap table management.

=== Governance, Risk & Compliance (GRC) platform ===
Diligent acquired Steele and Galvanize and incorporated their risk management, security and compliance solutions into its software suite, offering a more complete feature set for Risk, Audit and Compliance (RAC) professionals.

=== Diligent ESG ===
With the acquisition of Accuvio, Diligent further extended its GRC platform with ESG data aggregation enabling organizations to prepare, track and disclose key metrics such as greenhouse gas emissions in alignment with major carbon accounting frameworks and standards.

== Recognition ==
Diligent was recognized in the Deloitte Technology Fast 500 three times, ranking #98 in 2014, #420 in 2016 and #433 in 2020.

In 2018 and 2019, Diligent was named one of Inc. 5000’s Fastest Growing Private Companies in America.
