= Ashish Goyal =

Indian banker

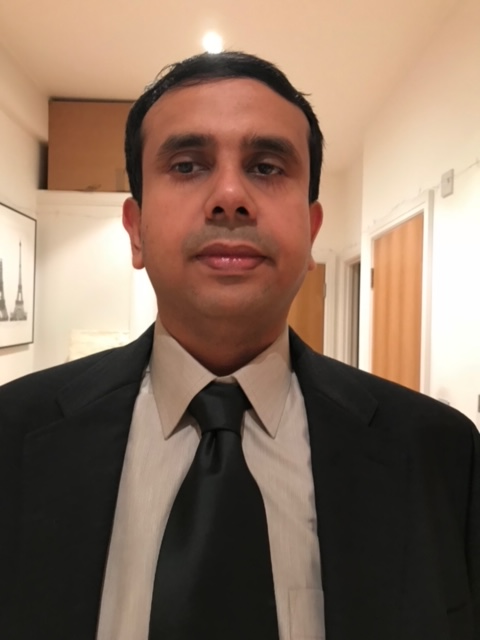
- Undated photograph of Goyal
- Born: Mumbai, India
- Education: Narsee Monjee Institute of Management Studies University of Pennsylvania

Ashish Goyal is an Indian financial adviser, public speaker and disability advocate who is blind. He has worked as a trader at financial institutions including JPMorgan Chase, BlueCrest Capital Management, Citadel LLC, and Pharo Management. He received the National Award for the Empowerment of Persons with Disabilities in 2010 and was named a Young Global Leader by the World Economic Forum in 2015.

== Biography ==
Goyal was born and raised in Mumbai, India. He developed retinitis pigmentosa, a degenerative eye condition that began affecting his vision at the age of seven. By the time he turned 19 years old, he had lost his sight completely.

Goyal ranked second in his class at the Narsee Monjee Institute of Management Studies in Mumbai and won the 2003 Dun and Bradstreet Best Student Awards. Early in his career, he worked at ING Vysya Bank before enrolling at The Wharton School of the University of Pennsylvania in 2006.

Goyal was the first blind student at Wharton in Philadelphia, where he was selected by his peers to receive the Joseph Wharton Award. He graduated from Wharton in 2008, earning an MBA with honours.

In 2008, he was hired by J.P Morgan. He has since worked as a portfolio manager for Macro Hedge Funds such as BlueCrest Capital, Citadel Investment Group, and Pharo Management.

Goyal received the National Award for the Empowerment of Persons with Disabilities on 3 December 2010.

In 2015, he was named a Young Global Leader by the World Economic Forum.

Goyal is a motivational speaker and has spoken at the London Stock Exchange and the World Economic Forum at Davos.

After moving to London, Goyal took up blind cricket and represented the Metro London Sports Club in 2009.
