= Genstar Capital =

American private equity firm

- Type: Private
- Industry: Private Equity
- Founded: 1988; 38 years ago
- Founder: Angus MacNaughton, Ross Turner, Richard D. Paterson, John A. West
- Headquarters: San Francisco, California, United States
- Key people: Jean-Pierre L. Conte (chairman, managing director), Ryan Clark (president and managing director), Rob Rutledge (managing director), Anthony Salewski (managing director), Eli Weiss (managing director)
- Products: Leveraged buyout, Growth capital
- AUM: US$49 billion (2023)
- Number of employees: 35+
- Website: gencap.com

Genstar Capital is an American private equity firm that executes leveraged buyout transactions in middle-market companies based in North America. Founded in 1988, Genstar currently has approximately $33 billion in assets under management.

Based in San Francisco, Genstar is focused on investing in financial services, software, industrial technology, and healthcare.

In June 2024, Genstar Capital ranked 25th in Private Equity International's PEI 300 ranking among the world's largest private equity firms.

== History ==
The firm's origins date back to Genstar Corporation, whose senior executives founded Genstar Capital in 1988. Genstar was a Canadian building-materials and financial-services company that invested $1.9 billion through 28 acquisitions from 1976 to 1986. Additionally, Genstar sold 40 businesses and entered into 75 joint ventures during this period. Genstar, which was listed on the New York Stock Exchange, was sold to Imasco, Ltd in 1986, at which point Genstar owned more than 100 businesses around the world. Following the sale of Genstar, a number of the company's executives formed a new investment partnership while, under Imasco's ownership, Genstar was broken up and divested through the late 1980s.

In March 1989, the newly independent firm raised a $100 million pool of capital to fund leveraged buyout transactions. Among the founders of what was then known as Genstar Capital Corp. (GCC) were Angus MacNaughton and Ross Turner, former chief executive officers of Genstar Corp., as well as Richard D. Paterson, previously senior vice president and chief financial officer, and John A. West, previously executive vice president of Genstar.

Through the mid-1990s, Genstar focused primarily on investments in industrial manufacturing companies. In 1995, J-P Conte joined the firm, and, through the second half of the 1990s, Genstar focused on investments in a group of growth sectors, including industrial technology and healthcare. President and managing director Ryan Clark, and managing directors Rob Rutledge, Anthony Salewski, and Eli Weiss joined in the 2000s. During this period, Genstar began to also invest in financial services and software. Today, the firm's core sectors are financial services, software, industrial technology, and healthcare.

In December 2019, Genstar Capital announced the successful completion of the sale of ECM Industries to Sentinel Capital Partners.

In 2020, Genstar Capital joined Diligent Corporation's Modern Leadership Initiative and pledged to create five new board roles among its portfolio companies for racially diverse candidates.

== Investment funds ==
Genstar invests through a series of private equity funds, pools of committed capital from pension funds, insurance companies, endowments, fund of funds, high-net-worth individuals, sovereign wealth funds, and from other institutional investors. Genstar has raised approximately over $40 billion of committed capital across eleven investment funds since inception in 1988.

- 1989 – Fund I ($100 million)
- 1996 – Fund II ($115 million)
- 2000 – Fund III ($221 million)
- 2004 – Fund IV ($506 million)
- 2007 – Fund V ($1.6 billion)
- 2012 – Fund VI ($914 million)
- 2015 – Fund VII ($2 billion)
- 2017 – Fund VIII ($3.95 billion)
- 2019 – Fund IX ($7 billion)
- 2021 - Fund X ($11.7 billion)
- 2023 - Fund XI ($12.6 billion)
