= Pharo Management =

UK based alternative investment fund

- Industry: Hedge Fund
- Founded: 2000; 26 years ago
- Founder: Guillaume Fonkenell
- Headquarters: London
- Area served: Worldwide
- Key people: Guillaume Fonkenell (CIO)
- Website: pharo.com

Pharo Management is a hedge fund founded in 2000 by Guillaume Fonkenell. Pharo trades foreign exchange, sovereign credit and interest rate markets in over 70 countries across Asia, Central and Eastern Europe, the Middle East and Africa, Latin America, as well as developed markets and manages five funds from their offices in London, New York, Hong Kong and Abu Dhabi. Its assets were affected by the COVID-19 pandemic. Its primary funds, whose assets included debt of Russia and Ukraine, were negatively impacted at the beginning of the 2022 Russian invasion of Ukraine, before the firm selling its position.

== Name ==
The name "Pharo" comes from the word "Φάρος" in Greek which was later adopted by Latin languages like French (e.g. Phare in French which denotes a tall building with a beam of light at the top).

== History ==
In 2011, utilising profits from the Pharo Management hedge fund, Guillaume Fonkenell founded Pharo Foundation. Pharo Foundation is working toward economic development and a self-reliant Africa. The Foundation does this by focusing on three missions in education, water and productivity, and operating in Somaliland, Ethiopia, Kenya, and Rwanda. These three missions are accomplished through two channels: non-profit operations, which invest in the development of public goods, and for-profit social enterprises, which invest in the private sector and embody the goal of African self-reliance.

In early 2019, Guillaume Fonkenell told investors he returned US$300 million that his hedge fund had been managing to Saudi Arabia's central bank, known as the Saudi Arabian Monetary Authority (SAMA). Fonkenell said he was upholding his firms principles in response to the murder of Saudi journalist Jamal Khashoggi, who is thought to have been killed by officials of the Saudi Arabian government. Pharo is the first hedge fund which refused to manage money coming from Saudi Arabia.

In 2025, Financial News reported that Pharo had established operations in Abu Dhabi and relocated senior portfolio manager Nicolas Sagna to lead its locally regulated entity. The move formed part of the firm's expansion in the Gulf region.

In 2025, the Pharo Macro Fund received The Hedge Fund Journal CTA and Discretionary Trader Award for Best Performing Emerging Markets Macro Fund in 2024. The awards were based on risk-adjusted performance data supplied by Preqin and NilssonHedge.

In early 2026, Bloomberg reported that the firm's flagship Pharo Macro Fund had recorded one of its strongest monthly performances during a period of increased volatility in global financial markets.

In 2026, Pharo School Homosha was shortlisted as one of ten finalists for the T4 Education World's Best School Prize for Overcoming Adversity. T4 Education describes the award as recognising schools that treat “adversity, challenges, and/or obstacles as an opportunity to learn and grow”. The school was recognised for its work to improve educational access and outcomes for girls in an underserved region of Ethiopia.

In 2026, the Pharo Macro Fund again received The Hedge Fund Journal CTA and Discretionary Trader Award, winning the Emerging Markets Macro category for its 2025 performance and its performance over two years.
