= Mitchell J. Blutt =

American physician

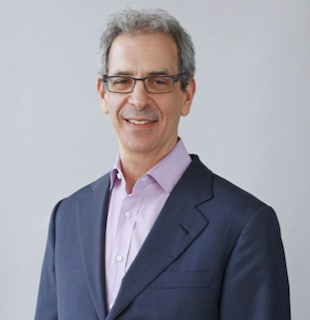
Mitchell Blutt

Mitchell J. Blutt is an American physician and businessman. He is the founder and CEO of the New York-based healthcare investment firm Consonance Capital and a former Executive Partner of J.P. Morgan Partners. He is also a Clinical Assistant Professor of Medicine in the Department of Medicine at Weill Cornell Medicine and the Graduate School of Medical Sciences of Cornell University.

== Physician & businessman ==
In 1978, he graduated from the University of Pennsylvania. He graduated from the University of Pennsylvania School of Medicine in 1982 and completed his medical residency at the New York Hospital/Cornell Medical School in 1985. He held the Robert Wood Johnson Foundation Clinical Scholars Fellowship at Penn while simultaneously earning his MBA from the Wharton School in 1987. Blutt was hired in 1987 by what became J.P. Morgan Partners. From 1987 to 1999, he divided his time between his investment work and teaching at Cornell University Medical Center.

== Consonance Capital ==
Blutt remains a Clinical Assistant Professor of Medicine at Weill Cornell Medicine. In 2005, he founded Consonance Capital, an investment firm focused on equity investments in healthcare. The firm includes a hedge fund and a private equity fund managed by Consonance Capital Management.

Blutt also helped establish a private equity division, Consonance Capital Partners, with partners Benjamin Edmands, Stephen McKenna, and Nancy-Ann DeParle. Consonance Capital Partners invests in privately owned healthcare companies. The firm closed its first private equity fund at $500 million and its second fund at $856 million in May 2020.

== Professional memberships and services ==
Blutt has served on the boards of several organizations, including The Michael J. Fox Foundation for Parkinson's Research. He has written columns for Forbes magazine.

He is a former trustee of the University of Pennsylvania, Penn Medicine, and the Brearley School, and has served on corporate boards including Cardinal Health and Fisher Scientific. He is currently on the Board of Advisors for the School of Arts and Sciences and the Wharton School at the University of Pennsylvania, and on the Board of Fellows and Executive Committee of Weill Cornell Medicine.

Blutt also serves on the board and Executive Committee of The Commonwealth Fund, a health policy research foundation, where he chairs the Investment Committee. He is the former chairman of the University of Pennsylvania's Center for Health Incentives & Behavioral Economics (CHIBE) External Advisory Board.

== Philanthropy ==
Blutt has supported the University of Pennsylvania through endowments and faculty positions. In 2007, he received the School of Medicine's Alumni Service Award. In 2018, he received the Alumni Award of Merit from the University of Pennsylvania. He also endowed the Blutt Singer-Songwriter Symposium, which has featured artists including Lou Reed, Patti Smith, Graham Nash, Rufus Wainwright, Questlove, Nona Hendryx, and Japanese Breakfast.

Blutt and his wife have endowed three presidential professorships at the University of Pennsylvania, in the School of Arts and Sciences, the Perelman School of Medicine, and the Wharton School.

== Family ==
Blutt married Margo Krody, a former New York City Ballet dancer, in 1993. They have three children.
