= Vivek Kulkarni =

Indian businessman

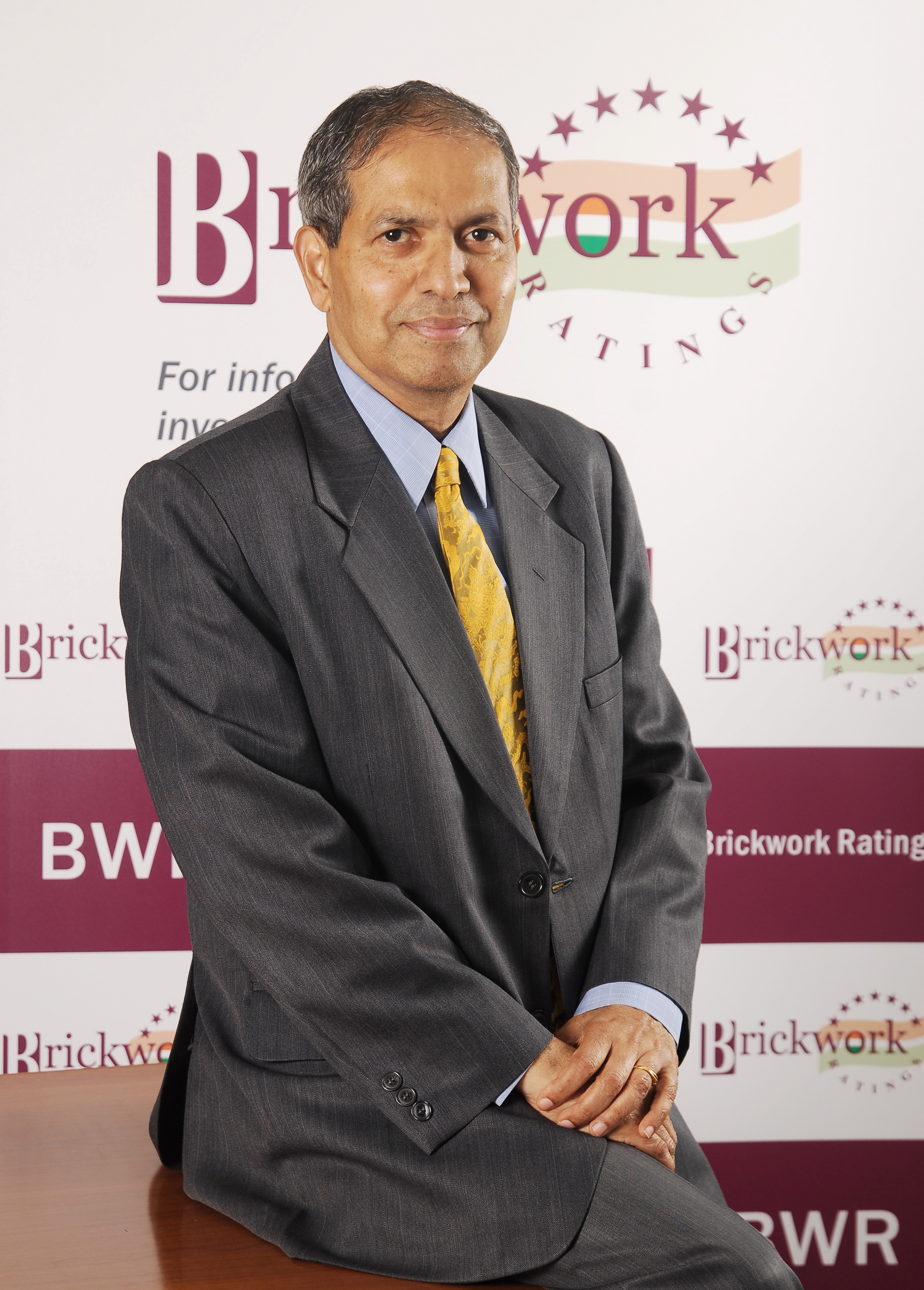
- Vivek Kulkarni in 2019
- Born: 21 July 1957 (age 68); Dharwad, Karnataka
- Citizenship: Indian
- Education: Karnatak University; Wharton School of the University of Pennsylvania
- Organization: Brickwork Group

Vivek Kulkarni is the Chairman of Brickwork India, a knowledge process outsourcing company & founder MD of Brickwork Ratings - credit rating agency of India. Vivek is the Indian Administrative Service officer from Karnataka.

== Early life ==
Born in Hubli, India on 21 July 1957, Vivek graduated with a degree in mechanical engineering from the B.V.B. College of Engineering & Technology, Hubli, Karnatak University. Vivek received his master's degree from Wharton School, University of Pennsylvania in 1991.

== Career ==
After engineering, Vivek worked with Indian Oil for a short period before joining IAS.

Vivek has served as Information Technology & Biotechnology Secretary, Government of Karnataka. During his tenure in Government, he was instrumental in building information technology and Biotech institutes and corporate events in Karnataka. He promoted public-private partnership in Governance. Prior to IT Secretary, he worked as Finance Secretary in Government of Karnataka, Head of CRISIL Advisory Services as well as the Division Chief SEBI. He was a faculty at the Boston University as well as the Indian Institute of Management Bangalore. Vivek also is an Adjunct professor at the Indian Institute of Science, Bangalore.

Vivek had pioneered the 'remote executive assistant' concept through Brickwork India, which received worldwide acclaim through various publications such as the New York Times bestseller authors, Thomas Friedman (The World Is Flat) and Timothy Ferris (The 4-Hour Workweek) and other publications like Fortune; Business Week - China-India survey, The Sunday Times, Esquire.

== Personal life ==
Vivek Kulkarni is married to Sangeeta and they have two children. Sangeeta is the co-founder and CEO of Brickwork India.
