= Nina Godiwalla =

American author and businesswoman

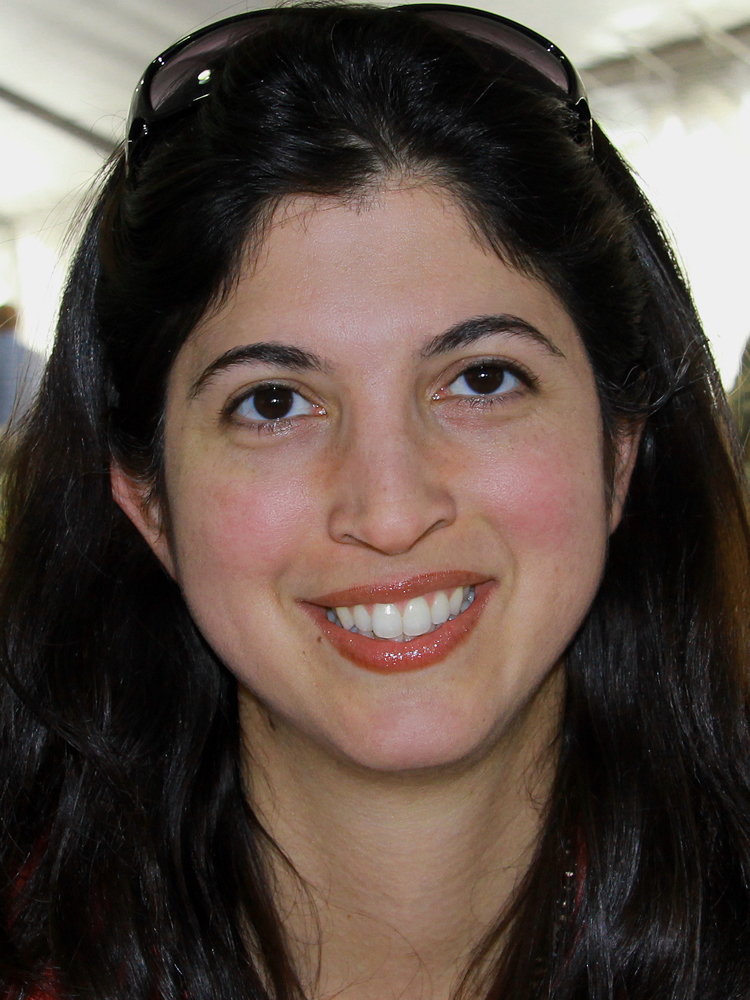
- Nina Godiwalla at the 2011 Texas Book Festival
- Education: University of Texas at Austin; Wharton School of Business; Dartmouth College
- Occupations: public speaker, author
- Honours: Texas Women's Hall of Fame Business Inductee, 2012; Duke University Trailblazer Award, 2012; Wharton School of Business Distinguished Alumna Award, 2015

Nina Godiwalla is an American author and businesswoman. She is CEO of MindWorks Leadership and the author of Suits: A Woman on Wall Street.

== Background and education ==
Godiwalla, was born and raised in Houston, Texas. She is an Indian-American of Parsi background. Godiwalla attended the University of Texas at Austin (UT) where she acquired a Bachelor of Business Administration in 1997. She later went on to Dartmouth College where she earned a Master of Arts in Liberal Studies degree. She also earned a Master of Business Administration in 2006 from the Wharton School of Business at the University of Pennsylvania.

== Career ==
Godiwalla began her career in investment banking with an internship at J.P. Morgan. Upon graduation from UT, she worked at Morgan Stanley from 1997 to 1999 in the corporate finance group. After Morgan Stanley, Godiwalla continued her career at corporate institutions including Johnson & Johnson and Oxygen Media.

Godiwalla is now the CEO of MindWorks Leadership, which provides training in leadership, diversity, and stress management.

== Involvement ==
Godiwalla is on The Wall Street Journal Executive Task Force for Women in the Economy, a leadership instructor for The University of Texas MBA Program, and a writer for Wharton Magazine.

In 2012 she accepted an invitation by the White House, Office of the President, to serve on their Leadership Roundtable. She also served on Texas Governor Rick Perry's Business Council.

=== Writing ===
Godiwalla's immigrant upbringing, her two years as an analyst at Morgan Stanley, and the issues she faced as a woman on Wall Street are the major subjects of her first book, Suits: A Woman on Wall Street. The book reflects an insider's perspective on women working on Wall Street from the outsider’s point of view of a second-generation Parsi Indian immigrant.

=== Speaking ===
Godiwalla has spoken internationally at venues including The White House, NASA, The World Affairs Council, Smithsonian, Harvard, and TEDxHouston Conference. Her speaking topics include Women and Minorities in Corporate America, Leadership, Diversity, and Stress Management. In 2014, she was the keynote speaker at the Evelyn Rubenstein Jewish Community Center of Houston's annual event celebrating Women's History Month.

=== Awards ===
Texas Women's Hall of Fame Business Inductee, 2012

Duke University Trailblazer Award, 2012

Wharton School of Business Kathleen McDonald Distinguished Alumna Award, 2015
