= Board portal =

A board portal is collaborative software that allows members of a board of directors to securely access board documents and collaborate with other board members electronically.

== History ==
The passing of the Sarbanes-Oxley Act has placed significant legal and financial responsibility on the board of directors to ensure that they fulfill their fiduciary duty to the corporation and has driven many companies to increase the number of outside, independent directors on the board. Consequently, this has led to more frequent meetings, increased information review, and increased communications between meetings. The purpose of a board portal is to securely support board communications and board workflows. The "Read Receipt" of documents by the directors is often a legal record that external auditors require.

== Features ==
A board portal can be a custom-built, in-house application, an off-the-shelf, commercial application that is deployed by IT, or a subscription-based, software as a service (examples being NASDAQ Boardvantage or Hippoly). Board portals provide the following features:

- Strict security: Due to the sensitive nature of board information, security and confidentiality is critical. Sometimes, board portals will use two-factor authentication for user logins, role-based access control to information, and full encryption of stored information and communications between members.
- Online accessibility: Board members can review documents or communicate with other members at any time, even when they are on the road.
- Offline accessibility: Board members can download documents to their computer for offline review. However, board portals ensure that downloaded documents still support the same strict level of security.
- Board packet creation, modification, and distribution: Corporate secretaries can use the board portal to create board materials and disseminate them online. Secretaries and meeting minutes checkers may review meeting minutes. Edits or deletion of documents can be done and the changes are immediately distributed. This saves the hassles associated with printing and handling changes after board packets have been printed. Board packets are often quite thick, with 600 pages on the low-end to as many as 2,000+ pages.
- Dashboard of Key Performance Indicators: to allow directors a quick view of the KPI of the organization's performance, a flexible dashboard is often an integral part of Board Portal packages
- Online collaboration support allows documents and board packets to allow for directors to record their comments and save a record of the same while reviewing such information.
- Data Retention Policy Support: To mitigate company liability, board portals enforce data retention policies on documents, as well as board member communications.
- Read Receipt of announcements, policy documents and any other legal documents is recorded and maintained by board portals.
- Electronic signing of documents like Meeting Minutes.
- Audit trail: To track the activity of users within the board portal such as accessing documents or failed sign-in attempts
- User directory: Board members can access the contact information of other board members when there is a need for communication or collaboration.

== Benefits ==
- Reduce paper usage and waste
- Faster board book creation and distribution
- Better source control of documents and security of information
- More timely communications with board members
- Access to information by board members from any place and at any time
- Searching capability of archived board packets
- Dashboard of organization's Key Performance Indicators
- One location for all important Announcements and documents which require a "Read Receipt"
- Improved broader Governance strategy
- Better collaboration between directors
- More directors collaboration before meetings

== Use in improving governance ==
Board portal software has a role to play in supporting the information sharing, decision making, risk management and accountability that comes with good governance. Governance software provides a single platform for managing board and committee meetings, risk, decision making and other governance-related activities. It provides an overview of governance throughout the organization and its shareholders, helping identify issues and drive improvement.
