= Ashmeet Sidana =

- Education: University of Southern California (BS Computer Science, 1989); Stanford University (MS Computer Science, 1991); Wharton School of the University of Pennsylvania (MBA, 2003)
- Occupation: Founder of Engineering Capital

Ashmeet Sidana is an American businessman, entrepreneur and venture capitalist. He is the Founder, Chief Engineer and Managing Partner of Engineering Capital.

== Education ==
Sidana obtained a BS from USC in 1989, a MS in Computer Science from Stanford University in 1991. He then graduated with an MBA from Wharton in 2003.

== Career ==
Sidana started his career at Hewlett Packard and then worked at Silicon Graphics, where he worked as an engineer. Subsequently, he founded Sidana Systems, where he served as Chief Executive Officer until the company was bought by Doclinx. He then worked at VMware, where he was in charge of product management for the company's product ESX Server. Until 2013, Sidana then worked with Foundation Capital, a venture capital fund.

=== Engineering Capital ===
In 2015, Sidana launched his own venture capital fund, Engineering Capital, with plans to focus his initial $32 million investment fund and portfolio on 10-15 start-ups from the infrastructure technology (IT and engineering) sector. For his second investment fund, Sidana raised $50 million.

== Personal life ==
Sidana is an action traveler and has made several excursions to Mt. Everest.
