= Nancy Wang =

American technology executive

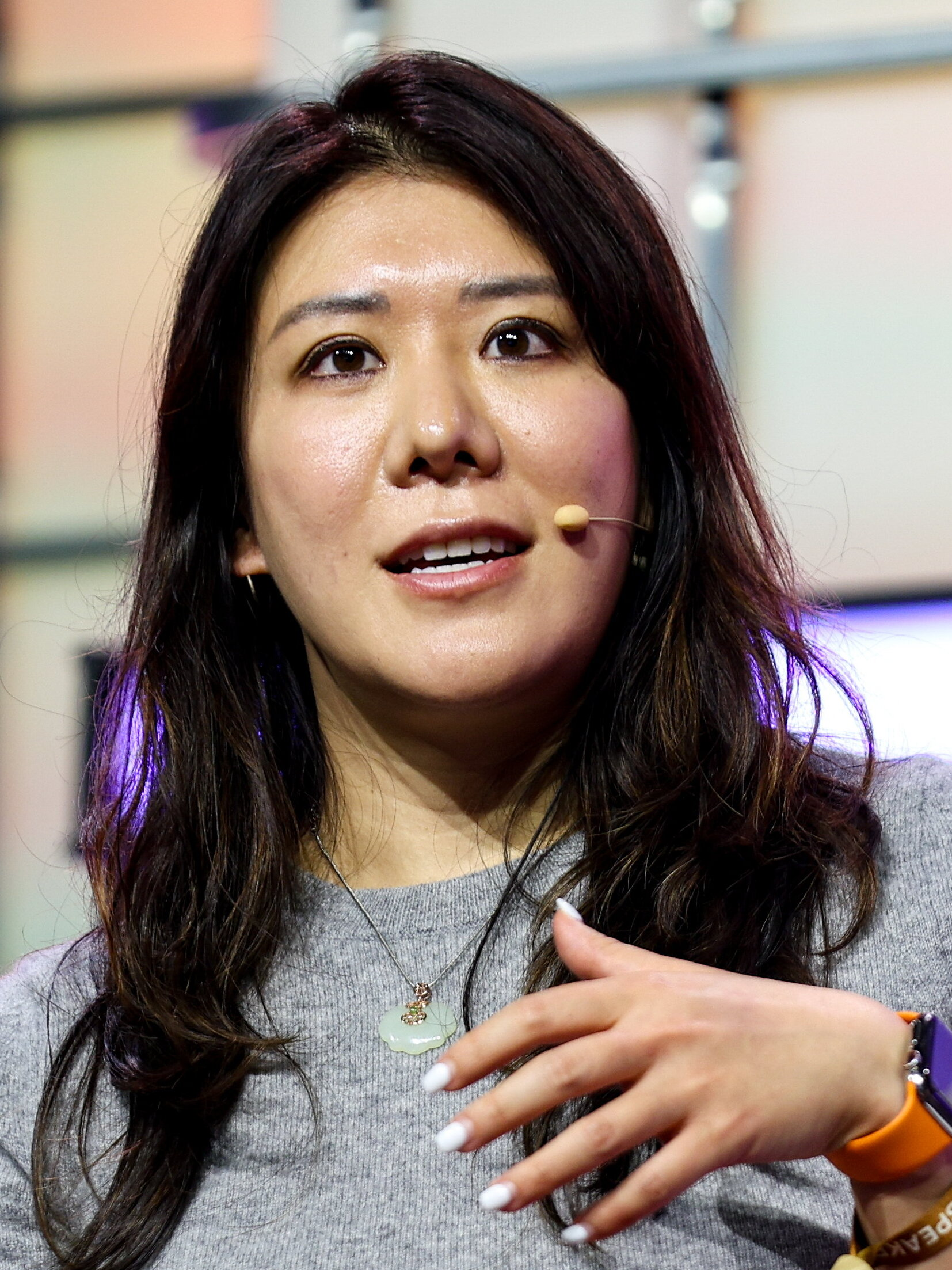
- Wang in 2025
- Education: University of Pennsylvania
- Title: General Manager of Data Protection and Governance services at Amazon Web Services; founder and Board Chair, Advancing Women in Tech
- Awards: Entrepreneur's Top 100 Women of Impact 2021

Nancy Wang is an American technology executive. She has led product development at Google, Rubrik, and Amazon, and was founder and CEO of Advancing Women in Tech (AWIT). She has received multiple awards and has multiple patents pending.

== Early life ==
Wang grew up in Wisconsin. She attended the University of Pennsylvania, where she was a Trustee Scholar and a Benjamin Franklin Honor Scholar. She graduated from the School of Engineering and Applied Science while also studying European History.

== Career ==
After graduation, Wang performed data system integration for the United States government, including the United States Intelligence Community.

From 2014 to 2016, Wang worked at Google Fiber, where she led network infrastructure product development. At that time, she was the first and only female product manager there, as well as the youngest product manager of any gender.

From 2017 to 2019, Wang was lead product manager at Rubrik, a Silicon Valley data security company.

From 2019 to 2022, Wang was the General Manager of Data Protection and Governance services at Amazon Web Services.

Wang is a venture partner at Felicis Ventures.

== Nonprofit work ==
In 2017, Wang founded Advancing Women in Product (AWIP), now Advancing Women in Tech (AWIT), a 501(c)(3) nonprofit organization focused on gender equity in the technology sector through education, networking, and mentorship. AWIT has published online courses on product management and technical skills through Coursera.

Wang helped establish the Executives In Residence program at the University of Pennsylvania's School of Engineering and Applied Science.
