= Richard C. Bradt =

American materials engineer (1938–2019)

Richard Carl Bradt (17 November 1938 – 3 January 2019) was an American materials engineer.

Bradt was born in St. Louis, Missouri, and raised in Mascoutah, Illinois. He graduated from the Massachusetts Institute of Technology in 1960 with a bachelor's degree in metallurgy and began working for Fansteel Metallurgical Corporation. After four years with Fansteel, Bradt enrolled at Rensselaer Polytechnic Institute for graduate study in materials engineering. He earned a master's degree in 1965 and a doctorate in 1967. Bradt joined the Pennsylvania State University faculty upon earning his Ph.D. He taught at Penn State until 1983, when he became a member of the University of Washington faculty. While in Seattle, Beadt was appointed to the Kyocera Professorship. In 1989, Bradt began teaching at the Mackay School of Mines within the University of Nevada, Reno. He was a professor at the University of Alabama between 1994 and 2009. Five years prior to retirement, Bradt was named Alton N. Scott Professor of Engineering. He died at UAB Hospital, in Birmingham, Alabama, on 3 January 2019, aged 80.
