= TrigML =

XML mark-up

TrigML is an XML mark-up language for user interfaces owned by Qualcomm and part of the BREW Platform. It was procured on October 12, 2004 when Qualcomm bought out a UK based company called Trigenix. Following the acquisition, TrigML, and its accompanying integrated development environment (IDE) were rebranded by Qualcomm as uiOne.

All development on uiOne was stopped in 2009 when Qualcomm made all the Engineering staff working on uiOne redundant.
