= Michael DiCandilo =

American businessman

- Born: Michael Dennis DiCandilo; 1961 (age 64–65)
- Occupation: businessman

Michael Dennis DiCandilo (born 1961) is an American businessman who was chief financial officer and executive vice president of AmerisourceBergen Corporation. He served as CFO from 2002 to February 2012. and won the 2011 Institutional Investor Best CFO Award in Healthcare Distribution and Technology. He attended the Wharton School of the University of Pennsylvania where he graduated with a bachelor's degree in accounting. He is a Certified Public Accountant. He served as Interim President and CEO of the United Way of Greater Philadelphia and Southern New Jersey between 2017 and 2018 and was awarded the John C. Haas Regional Champion Medal in 2018. He is currently a Distinguished Board Member at the United Way where he has served since 2009.
