= Annie Kline Rikert =

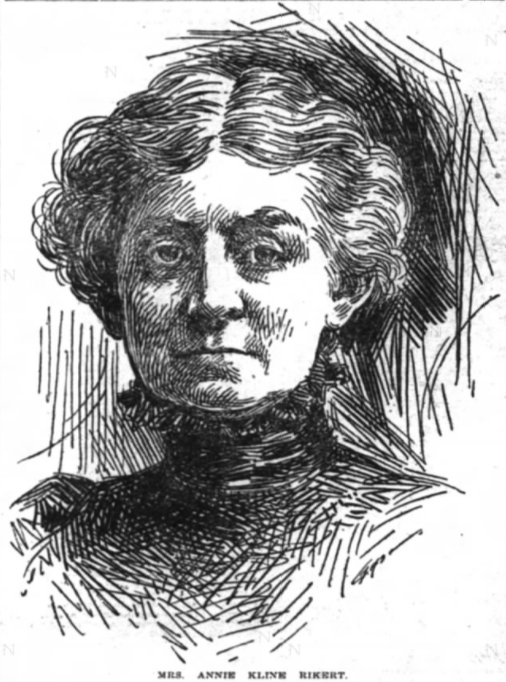
Annie Kline Rikert

Annie Kline Rikert (1840/41–1906) was a Civil War spy, California mining pioneer and founder of the Women's Railroad.

== Birth and family ==
Annie Kline Rikert was born in 1840 or 1841 in Warren County, Mississippi to Ninion Edward Kline, a cotton plantation owner, and Patience Ruth Lynche. She married William E. Townsend in 1873 in Galveston, Texas, with whom she had a daughter Maud (1876–1950). Within a month after their daughter's birth, the family is registered in San Francisco, California. In 1880 Kline and Townsend were separated. Kline moved with her daughter to Calico as a silver prospector, and by 1886 she remarried a fellow miner, Austin M. Rikert (1855–1913). In December 1903 in Petaluma, California, Rikert files for divorce from Kline on the grounds that she had deserted him. She died of cancer on 13 December 1906 in Sacramento and is buried in Colma, California.

== Confederate spy ==
An account of her activities during the American Civil War was published in 1898. She recounted being present at the Siege of Vicksburg, traveling with Confederate President Jefferson Davis to far-off Lynchburg, Virginia, meeting General John C. Breckinridge, and arriving in Greeneville, Tennessee the day after General John Hunt Morgan was killed (September 4, 1864). Her spying activities were discovered and she was arrested in Knoxville, Tennessee by the Union Army. She was held by General William Rosecrans at Chattanooga, Tennessee for six weeks. Upon her release she carried out a spy mission to burn a bridge on the Nashville to Chattanooga line.

Her return home was fraught with peril. She walked more than a hundred miles from Tennessee to Alabama, then on to Selma, Alabama where the Battle of Selma was fought in spring 1865. She traveled on to Georgia where she heard of the Fall of Richmond and the end of the war. She traveled to Jackson, Mississippi and then to her family home near Vicksburg.

== Mining ==
She is on the 1880 US census living in San Francisco, California with her first husband W. E. Townsend, a bookkeeper. They had one daughter, Maud Townsend, born in about 1872. Her account of how she entered mining was that she had no household skills, so when her husband died in about 1881, she and her daughter went to San Bernardino, California. She mined silver and then moved on to Lower California where she continued to mine and returned to the United States, settling in Tuolumne County, California where she prospected on government land.

== Railroad ==
In December 1897 Articles of incorporation were filed with the California Secretary of State for the formation of the Stockton and Tuolumne County Railroad Company. News reports of March 1898 announced construction equipment owned by the firm of Erickson Brothers setting out to begin work. The Associated Press reported in August 1898 Rikert announced she would issue $1,000,000 bonds to build the Stockton and Tuolumne Railroad. Construction was already underway; 19 miles of grading had been completed. It was termed the "Women's Railroad" because the majority of investors were women. However the enterprise disintegrated in a series of lawsuits. In November 1898 the Laymance Company suit for the recovery of bonds or their value at $30,000. By June 1899 Rikert was fending rumors that Santa Fe Railroad was attempting to buy the railroad. In December 1899 even the contractor, Erickson, had filed suit against the railroad company.
