= Dawne Williams =

Dawne Williams is a banker from Saint Kitts and Nevis, who was the first woman to be appointed Chief Executive Officer of the St. Kitts-Nevis-Anguilla National Bank Limited.

== Career ==
Williams is an alumna of the Wharton School of the University of Pennsylvania's FirstCaribbean Leadership Programme. She was appointed Chief Executive Officer of the St. Kitts-Nevis-Anguilla National Bank Limited on 1 September 2013. She was the first woman to be appointed to the position and held the role until 31 August 2016. She had previously held the post of Director of Retail Banking at both Barclays and at FirstCaribbean International Bank. In 2017 she joined the executive board of the International Federation of Business and Professional Women. In 2021 she was re-elected as the Federation's Regional Co-ordinator for North America and the Caribbean.

== Awards and recognition ==
In 2013 and in 2014 she was inducted into the Ministry of Development, Culture and Gender Affairs' 'Pioneering Women Gallery'. In 2016 she was selected as one of the '40 Most Influential and Powerful Women' in Saints Kitts and Nevis.
