= Brian Stafford (businessman) =

American businessman

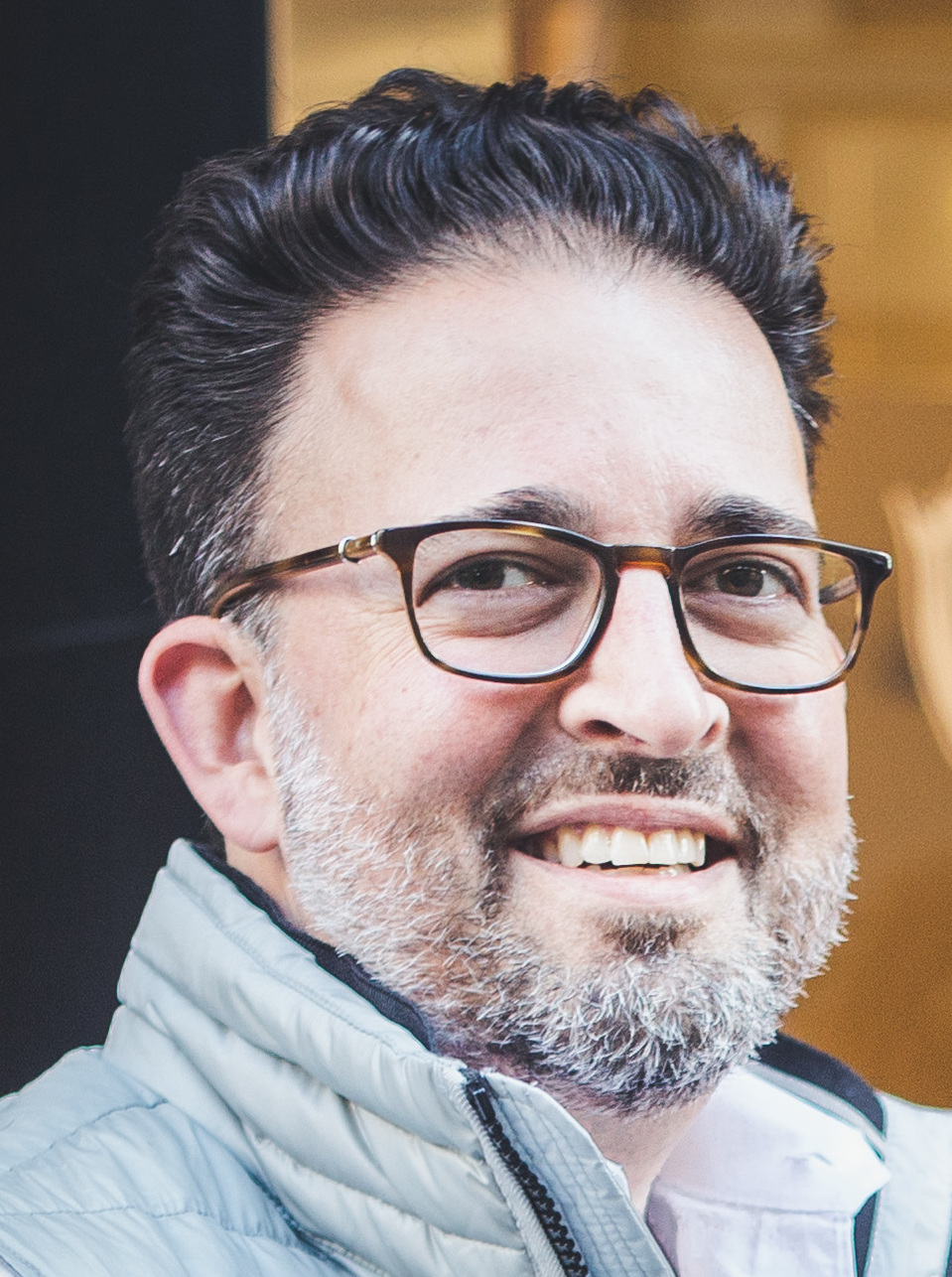
- Education: Wharton School; University of Chicago
- Occupation: CEO of Diligent Corporation
- Spouse: Céliné Dufétel

Brian Stafford is an American businessman and the CEO of Diligent Corporation.

== Education ==
Stafford graduated with a bachelor's degree in economics from the University of Pennsylvania's Wharton School and subsequently obtained a master's degree in computer science from the University of Chicago.

== Career ==
Stafford founded and led CarOrder, an automotive company and division of Trilogy Software based in Austin, Texas, and served as the company's president and CEO.

He subsequently became a partner at McKinsey & Company, where he founded and led the company's Growth Stage Tech Practice. At McKinsey, he focused on developing SaaS companies.

Stafford is also co-founder of Blue Collective, an investment firm based in New York.

=== Diligent ===
Brian Stafford is the chief executive officer of Diligent Corporation, a SaaS-based company. He assumed the role of CEO in March 2015 and is responsible for all day-to-day operations. Under Stafford's leadership, Diligent's annual revenues grew from $80 million in 2015 to $500 million as of 2022. During his tenure, Diligent also launched Governance Cloud, an integrated enterprise management solution.

== Additional affiliations and memberships ==
Stafford is a member of the board of trustees of the Brooklyn Academy of Music.

== Awards and recognitions ==
Stafford was honored as one of the 100 most influential leaders in corporate governance by the National Association of Corporate Directors (NACD) in 2018, 2019 and 2020.

In 2021, he was recognized by the Stevie Awards as an Executive of the Year in the International Business Awards, and he won People Focused CEO of the Year in the Great Employers of the Year Awards.

== Personal life ==
Stafford is married to Céliné Dufétel, former CEO and COO of Checkout.com.

== Publications ==
- Stafford, Brian; Schindlinger, Dottie (2019). Governance in the Digital Age. New York: Wiley. ISBN 1119546702
