= Taptu =

Taptu Ltd, Taptu Inc
- Type: defunct
- Industry: Social Media
- Founded: 2007
- Headquarters: Cambridge, UK
- Products: Mobile Social News Aggregator, Mobile Search

Taptu was a social media and technology company that built platforms, tools and applications that enabled content on touch screen mobile devices, including phones running iOS and Android. Taptu was a privately held company that was founded in Cambridge, England, in 2007 and was funded by DFJ Esprit and Sofinnova. The company was based in Cambridge and Denver, Colorado, United States.

In September 2012, Taptu was acquired by Mediafed Ltd. The Taptu service shut down March 31, 2015, a year before Mediafed went into administration.

== Products ==
=== Original product ===
Taptu's first product was a mobile search engine, provided as a website using html optimised for phones, and dedicated apps for iPhone and Android. It was closed in early 2011.

==== My Taptu ====
Its other product was My Taptu, a social news aggregator that drew heavily on the company’s mobile search heritage but attempts to move them beyond search. According to Taptu, the app, which was available on the iPhone and Android devices, was "aimed at solving information overload," or what Taptu calls "app hopping." It presented all the information that a person "is into" in a "one- stop app" through "streams," or what CNET described as “content playlists.” My Taptu tried to separate itself in the social news space by offering ways of personalization.

== Recognition and awards ==
- Overall Mobile Search Company of the Year, Mobile Search Awards, September 2008
- Best Search Provider 2008, Mobile Entertainment Awards
- Commercial Category, MEX Design Competition
- Red Herring Top 100 European Tech Startups, April 2008
- Global Community Award, MobileMonday Peer Awards, February 2008
- Meffys 2010, Winner of Content Discovery and Personalisation Award
- TechCrunch Europas 2010, Highly Commended in the category of Best Mobile Start Up
