= Anne Sceia Klein =

American businesswoman and communications specialist

- Education: University of Pennsylvania

Anne Sceia Klein is an American businesswoman and communications specialist. She is the founder and former president of the Anne Klein Communications Group (AKCG).

== Early life and education ==
As one of 12 women in her class, Klein graduated from The Wharton School at the University of Pennsylvania in 1964.

== Career ==
Klein started her career in marketing at a predecessor of SEPTA.

In January 1982, Klein founded her own public relations agency Anne Klein & Associates in Mount Laurel, New Jersey. The company focuses on expert strategic planning, crisis and issues communications and community outreach. In 1985, Gerhart Klein, her husband, joined the company as Executive Vice President, general counsel and chief technology officer. Klein served as the company’s President until 2014, when she sold the firm to Chris Lukach, and has since served in an advisory role.

Since she left the company, Klein has focused on philanthropic efforts together with her husband Gerhart Klein.

== Works ==
Klein co-authored the book "On the Cusp: The Women of Penn '64", which contains the stories of 19 women who graduated from the University of Pennsylvania in 1964.

== Awards and recognitions ==
Klein has received different awards and recognitions for her work.

In 2004, she was inducted in the Philadelphia Public Relations Association’s (PPRA) Hall of Fame and in 2012, was elected as a Woman of Distinction by the Philadelphia Business Journal.
