= George Bradt =

American businessman (born 1958)

George Benet Bradt (born 1958) is the founder and chairman of executive onboarding group PrimeGenesis. He provided consulting assistance to Elizabeth Arden, Merrill Lynch, MTV, and Miller Brewing. He is also a Principal at the CEO Connection.

== Background ==
Bradt received an AB from Harvard, and an MBA from The Wharton School at the University of Pennsylvania. He served as an executive in sales, marketing, and general management around the world at Unilever, Procter & Gamble, Coca-Cola, and J.D. Power and Associates as chief executive of its Power Information Network spinoff.

Bradt is a principal of the membership organization CEO Connection".

== Writings ==
Bradt is author or co-author of four books about onboarding, "The New Leader's 100-Day Action Plan, "Onboarding", "First-Time Leader" and "The Total Onboarding Program" and two books about parenting, "Back-To-School Chats, Advice From Fathers To Their Sons", and "Back-To-School Chats - Advice From Mothers To Their Daughters", as well as, musical plays (book lyrics and music) including "The Man with the Glass Heart"

He writes a weekly column on Forbes.com, "The New Leader's Playbook"
