= New England Preparatory School Athletic Council =

Sports governing organization in the USA

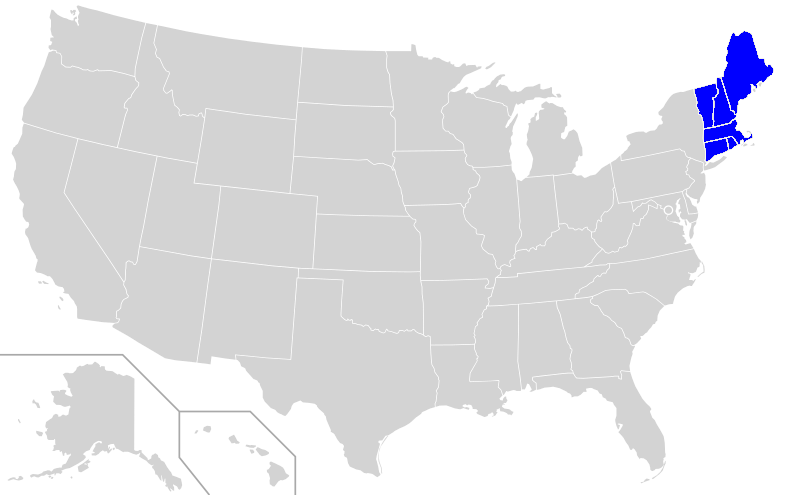
- Abbreviation: NEPSAC
- Formation: 1942; 84 years ago
- Headquarters: Hudson, Massachusetts, U.S.
- Region served: New England
- Members: 169 members; 24 associate members
- President: Ryan Frost
- Website: nepsac.org

The New England Preparatory School Athletic Council (NEPSAC) is an organization that serves as the governing body for sports in preparatory schools and leagues in New England. The organization has 169 full member schools as well as 24 associate member schools. The associate member schools are from New England as well as outside the region, including Indiana, New Jersey, New York, and Ontario. The organization is headquartered in Hudson, Massachusetts.

== History ==
Although the relationships and rivalries between many of these schools began long before the 20th century, the New England Preparatory School Athletic Council was officially founded in 1942 as an organization of athletic directors from preparatory schools in New England also with two members from Lower Canada.

School representatives met at the Harvard Club of Boston to discuss the future of preparatory school athletics due to government regulations imposed during World War II.

== Member schools ==
The following schools are members of the New England Preparatory School Athletic Council:

- Applewild School
- Avon Old Farms School
- Austin Preparatory School
- Bancroft School
- Beaver Country Day School
- Belmont Day School
- Belmont Hill School
- The Bement School
- Berkshire School
- Berwick Academy
- Boston Trinity Academy
- Boston University Academy
- Bradford Christian Academy
- Brewster Academy
- Bridgton Academy
- Brimmer and May School
- British International School of Boston
- Brooks School
- Brookwood School
- Brunswick School
- Buckingham Browne & Nichols School
- Cambridge Friends School
- Cambridge Montessori School
- The Cambridge School of Weston
- Canterbury School
- Cardigan Mountain School
- The Carroll School
- CATS Academy Boston
- Chapel Hill – Chauncy Hall School
- Charles River School
- Cheshire Academy
- Choate Rosemary Hall
- Christian Heritage School
- Commonwealth School
- Concord Academy
- Covenant Christian Academy
- Cushing Academy
- Dana Hall School
- Darrow School
- Dedham Country Day School
- Deerfield Academy
- Derby Academy
- Dexter Southfield School
- Dublin School
- Eaglebrook School
- Eagle Hill School
- Ethel Walker School
- Faith Christian Academy
- Fay School
- Fenn School
- Fessenden School
- Foote School
- Forman School
- The Frederick Gunn School
- Gann Academy
- Glen Urquhart School
- Gould Academy
- The Governor's Academy
- Greens Farms Academy
- Greenwich Academy
- Greenwich Country Day School
- Groton School
- Hamden Hall Country Day School
- The Harvey School
- Hebron Academy
- High Mowing School
- Hillside School
- Holderness School
- Hoosac School
- Hopkins School
- Hotchkiss School
- Hyde School
- Indian Mountain School
- Inly School
- International School of Boston
- Kent School
- Kents Hill School
- Kimball Union Academy
- King School
- Kingswood-Oxford School
- Landmark School
- Lawrence Academy at Groton
- The Learning Center for the Deaf
- Lexington Christian Academy
- Loomis Chaffee School
- MacDuffie School
- Marianapolis Preparatory School
- Marvelwood School
- Masters School
- The Master's School
- The Meadowbrook School of Weston
- Middlesex School
- Millbrook School
- Milton Academy
- Miss Hall's School
- Miss Porter's School
- Montrose School
- Nashoba Brooks School
- New Hampton School
- New York Military Academy
- The Newman School
- Newton Country Day School
- Noble and Greenough School
- Northfield Mount Hermon School
- Oakwood Friends School
- The Park School
- Phillips Academy
- Phillips Exeter Academy
- The Pike School
- Pingree School
- Pomfret School
- Portsmouth Abbey School
- Proctor Academy
- Providence Country Day School
- Rectory School
- Renbrook School
- Rivers School
- Rocky Hill School
- Roxbury Latin School
- Rumsey Hall School
- Rye Country Day School
- Sacred Heart Greenwich
- St. Andrew's School
- St. George's School
- St. Luke's School
- St. Mark's School
- St. Paul's School
- St. Sebastian's School
- St. Thomas More School
- Salisbury School
- School of the Holy Child
- Shady Hill School
- Shore Country Day School
- South Kent School
- Stoneleigh-Burnham School
- Storm King School
- Suffield Academy
- Tabor Academy
- Taft School
- Tenacre Country Day School
- Thayer Academy
- Tilton School
- Tower School
- Trinity-Pawling School
- Vermont Academy
- The Waldorf School
- Waring School
- Watkinson School
- Westminster School
- Westover School
- The Wheeler School
- Wilbraham & Monson Academy
- Williams Memorial Institute
- Williston Northampton School
- The Winchendon School
- Winsor School
- The Woodhall School
- Woodward School for Girls
- Wooster School
- Worcester Academy

=== Associate member schools ===
- Académie Saint-Louis
- Academy at Penguin Hall
- Albany Academy
- American School for the Deaf
- Bishop's College School
- Capitol Preparatory Harbor School
- Culver Academies
- EF International Academy
- The Hill School
- Kings-Edgehill School
- The Lawrenceville School
- Lee Academy
- Moses Brown School
- Nichols School
- North Yarmouth Academy
- Princeton Day School
- Redemption Christian Academy
- St. Andrew's College
- Stanstead College
- The Woodstock Academy
- Wyoming Seminary

== Leagues ==
The following leagues are composed of members of the New England Preparatory School Athletic Council:

- Eastern Independent League
- Fairchester Athletic Association
- Founders League
- Girls Independent League
- Housatonic Valley Athletic League
- Hudson Valley Athletic League
- Independent Girls Conference
- Independent School League
- Lakes Region League
- Maine Association of Independent School Athletic Directors
- Massachusetts Bay Independent League
- Southeastern New England Independent Schools Athletic Association
