= Bancroft School =

Prep school in Worcester, Massachusetts, US

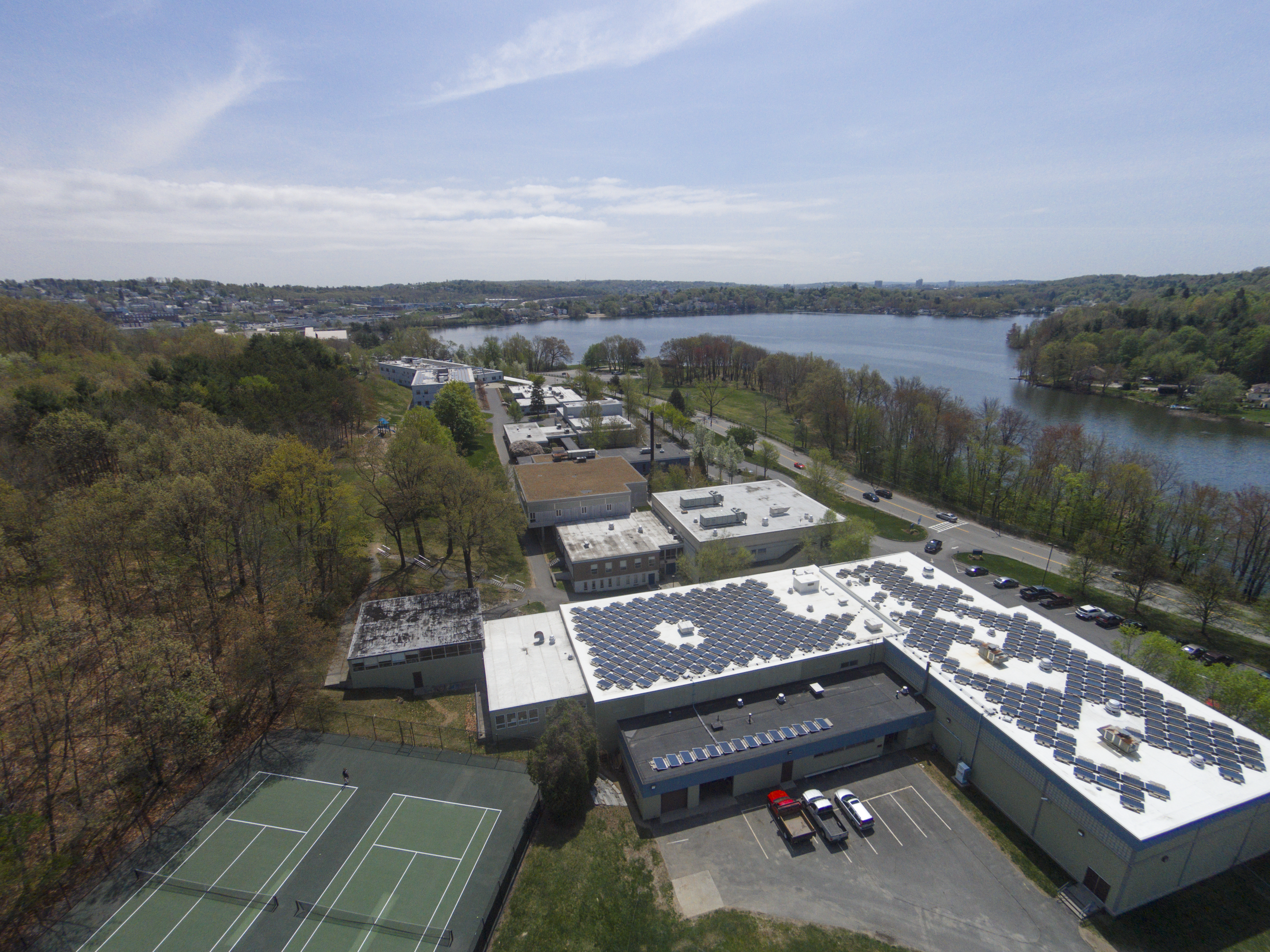
- Bancroft School from the west

Location
- Worcester, MA, US; 42°18′15″N 71°48′55″W

Information
- Type: Private secondary
- Established: 1900
- Head of school: Stephanie Luebbers
- Grades: PK-12
- Enrollment: 429 students
- Colors: Blue and gray
- Athletics conference: Eastern Independent League (EIL), New England Preparatory School Athletic Council (NEPSAC), and New England Interscholastic Rowing Association (NEIRA)
- Mascot: Bulldogs

Bancroft School in Worcester, Massachusetts, United States, is an independent, co-educational, PreK–12, college-preparatory day school. Students typically live in Central Massachusetts and MetroWest Boston. The school campus measures 30-acre (120,000 m^{2}). The school has three divisions: pre-kindergarten and lower school, middle school, and upper school.

== History ==
The School was named for George Bancroft, 1800–1891, educator, diplomat, philanthropist, and writer who helped found the U.S. Naval Academy and wrote the first comprehensive history of the United States.

- 1900: Bancroft School established at 93 Elm Street by a group of Worcester parents.
- 1922: Moved to new facilities on Sever Street.
- 1958: Moved to current location at 110 Shore Drive after Norton Abrasives (now a brand of Saint-Gobain) donated 27 acres (110,000 m^{2}) of land.
- 1969: Converted to fully co-ed. Prior to 1969, the Lower and Middle Schools served both boys and girls, but the Upper School enrolled girls only.
- 1970s: Added language lab, a larger woodworking shop, a new gym, an art building, and expanded playing fields.
- 1980s and 1990s: Dedicated the Art Center, Fletcher Athletic Center, Fuller Science Center, Harrington Performing Arts Theatre, Stoddard Center, and Garfield and Prouty Libraries.
- 2002: Renovated the Fuller Science Center and opened the McDonough Center, which houses the Lower and Middle School programs.
- 2009: Signed agreement with Tongji University, Shanghai, China, to establish a teacher and student exchange program between Bancroft and Tongji’s Number 1 High School.
- 2010: Installed 462 high-efficiency solar panels on the McDonough Center roof.
- 2011: Installed an additional 434 solar panels on the roof of the Fletcher Athletic Center.
- 2011: Initiated the region’s first iPad initiative for classroom teaching and learning.

== Photos ==
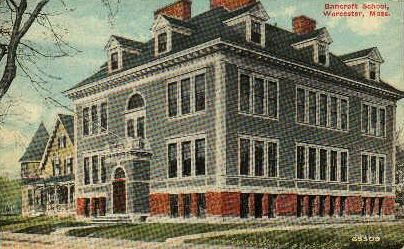
Elm Street Building

== Athletics ==
As one of the 11 member schools in the Eastern Independent League (EIL), Bancroft competes in a number of sports with other teams in the New England Preparatory School Athletic Council (NEPSAC).

=== Athletic Offerings ===
MS teams include:

- Boys: Baseball, Basketball, Lacrosse, Soccer, Tennis
- Girls: Basketball, Field Hockey, Lacrosse, Soccer, Softball, Volleyball
- Coed: Cross Country, Tennis

US varsity teams include:

- Boys: Baseball, Basketball, Crew, Lacrosse, Soccer, Tennis
- Girls: Basketball, Crew, Field Hockey, Lacrosse, Soccer, Tennis, Softball, Volleyball
- Coed: Alpine Skiing, Cross Country, Track & Field, Golf, Swim

Bancroft's athletic program has produced EIL and NEPSAC Championships across a number of its sports.

Sport	EIL Championships	NEPSAC Championships
Girls' Volleyball	14	5
Field Hockey	11	0
Girls' Tennis	10	1
Girls' Cross Country	9	2
Softball	9	0
Boys' Tennis	7	2
Boys' Cross Country	6	1
Girls' Soccer	6	2
Boys' Basketball	4	1
Boys' Soccer	2	1
Boys' Lacrosse	2	0
Golf	1	0

=== Record-Setting Volleyball Program ===
Bancroft's girls' volleyball program was established in 1996 by coach Bob Stein and Athletic Director Steve Kelley. Within three years, the Bulldogs claimed their first EIL Championship. Between 1999-00 and 2012, Bancroft won 12 consecutive Eastern Independent League titles and five straight NEPSAC Championships. In the midst of this run, the Bulldogs set the Massachusetts state record for consecutive wins by winning their 111th straight game on January 16, 2009 against Dana Hall School. The streak continued until October 5, 2011 when Bancroft fell to Buckingham Browne & Nichols after winning 168 consecutive matches.

== Headmasters & Headmistresses ==
- 1900–1915: Frank Robson
- 1915–1926: Miriam Titcomb
- 1926–1938: Hope Fisher
- 1938–1943: Bradford Kingman
- 1943–1959: Henry Tiffany
- 1944–1946: Edith Jones (interim)
- 1959–1960: Elizabeth Vandemoer (interim)
- 1960–1981: Wyatt Garfield
- 1981–1992: Marigolden Tritschler
- 1992–1998: Theodore G. Sharp
- 1998–1999: Wyatt Garfield & Edgar Gauthier (interim-heads)
- 1999–2014: Scott R. Reisinger
- 2014–2022: James P. "Trey" Cassidy
- 2022-2023: Tim Saburn (interim)
- 2023–Present: Stephanie Luebbers

== Notable alumni ==
Notable alumni of Bancroft School include:

- Jamie Dinan, Class of 1977; investor and founder of York Capital Management
- Esther Forbes, Class of 1908; winner of the 1943 Pulitzer Prize for History for a biography of Paul Revere and the 1944 Newbery Medal for Johnny Tremain
- Mahlon Hoagland, biochemist, discoverer of amino-acid activating enzymes
- Myra Kraft (née Hiatt) (1942–2011), Bancroft Class of 1960; philanthropist with the New England Patriots Charitable Foundation, Robert K. and Myra H. Kraft Foundation, American Repertory Theatre, Brandeis University, United Way of Massachusetts Bay, Boys and Girls Clubs of Boston, Kraft Stadium for American football in Jerusalem
- Denise Eisenberg Rich, Class of 1962; New York socialite
- Robert Waring Stoddard, Class of 1923; former editor of the Worcester Telegram & Gazette; one of the founders of the John Birch Society
- Jackson Stell, Class of 2009, also known as Big Wild; an electronic DJ, producer, composer, and engineer.
