= Eastern Independent League =

- Conference: NEPSAC
- Commissioner: Brook Sumner, Landmark School
- Sports fielded: 14
- No. of teams: 12
- Headquarters: Boston, Massachusetts
- Region: New England

The Eastern Independent League (EIL) is composed of eleven New England preparatory schools that compete athletically and academically. The EIL's twelve members compete in a number of sports in the New England Prep School Athletic Conference (NEPSAC).

== Members ==
The Eastern Independent League is composed of 12 schools.

School	Location	Colors	Mascot	Established	Enrollment	Grades	Head of School	Athletic Director
Bancroft School	Worcester, MA		Bulldogs	1900	420	PK-12	Stephanie Luebbers	Garth A. Adams
Beaver Country Day School	Chestnut Hill, MA		Beavers	1920	452	6-12	Sarah Palmas (interim)	Alex Gould
Berwick Academy	South Berwick, ME		Bulldogs	1791	592	PK-12	Dr. Scott Erickson	Rob Quinn
Concord Academy	Concord, MA		Chameleons	1922	378	9-12	Henry Fairfax	Sue Johnson
Dana Hall School	Wellesley, MA		Dragons	1881	484 (girls)	5-12	Katherine Bradley	John Suby
Landmark School	Prides Crossing, MA		Vikings	1971	400	2-12	Josh Clark	Brook Sumner
Lexington Christian Academy	Lexington, MA		Lions	1946	350	6-12	John Khouri	Andrew Mitchell
Newton Country Day School	Newton, MA		Falcons	1880	400 (girls)	5-12	Jessica Hooper	Wayne Perry
Pingree School	South Hamilton, MA		Highlanders	1961	335	9-12	Timothy Johnson	Betsy Kennedy
Portsmouth Abbey School	Portsmouth, RI		Ravens	1926	360	9-12	Daniel McDonough	Chris Milmoe
The Wheeler School	Providence, RI		Warriors	1889	800	PK-12	Mark J. Anderson	Sean Kelly
The Winsor School	Boston, MA		Wildcats	1886	430 (girls)	5-12	Meredith Legg	Sherren Granese

== Sports ==
Sports played in the EIL include:

- Basketball (boys' and girls')
- Baseball
- Cross Country (boys' and girls')
- Field Hockey
- Golf (boys' only)
- Ice Hockey (girls' only)
- Lacrosse (boys' and girls')
- Soccer (boys' and girls')
- Softball
- Squash (girls' only)
- Swimming (boys' and girls')
- Tennis (boys' and girls')
- Track and Field (boys' and girls')
- Volleyball
- Wrestling

=== Boys' Basketball ===
The EIL has been one of the most competitive boys' basketball leagues in New England over the years. Recently, however, the league has been dominated by Beaver Country Day School who won every championship between the 2009–10 and 2018–19 seasons.

School	Number of Championships (Since 1990–91)	Most Recent Championship
Beaver Country Day School	19	2020
Pingree School	8	2019
Bancroft School	4	2000
Lexington Christian Academy	4	2025
Chapel Hill-Chauncy Hall	1	1999

2021-2022 Season:

Pos	Team	Pld	W	L	GF	GA	GD	Pts	Qualification or relegation
1	Lexington Christian Academy	12	11	1	666	451	+215	23	Advance to EIL and NEPSAC playoffs
2	Portsmouth Abbey School	11	8	3	590	465	+125	19	Advance to EIL playoffs
3	Beaver Country Day School	7	6	1	507	282	+225	13	Advance to EIL playoffs
4	Pingree School	8	5	3	477	370	+107	13	Advance to EIL playoffs
5	Concord Academy	11	4	7	537	649	−112	15	
6	Berwick Academy	11	3	8	573	743	−170	14	
7	Bancroft School	11	2	9	464	664	−200	13	
8	Landmark School	11	2	9	442	632	−190	13	

Source: Eastern Independent League

Semifinals
1	Lexington Christian Academy	37
4	Portsmouth Abbey School	23
2	Beaver Country Day School	67
3	Pingree School	46

Final
1	Lexington Christian Academy
2	Beaver Country Day School
