= Huntley Fitzpatrick =

American author of young adult fiction

- Born: Huntley M. Funsten
- Occupation: Novelist
- Writing career
- Genre: Young adult
- Website: huntleyfitzpatrick.com

Huntley Fitzpatrick was an American author of young adult (YA) fiction.

She grew up in a small coastal town in Connecticut, wanting to be a writer. She graduated from Concord Academy in Concord, Massachusetts in 1981, and attended Yale University in New Haven, Connecticut.

Fitzpatrick worked as an editor in academic publishing and as an editor on teen titles at Harlequin before becoming a full-time YA writer.

She lived in Massachusetts with her husband and their six children.

She died in April 2022 after a long illness.

== Novels ==
- My Life Next Door New York : Dial Books, 2012.
- What I Thought Was True New York, New York: Dial Books, an imprint of Penguin Group (USA) LLC, 2014.
- The Boy Most Likely To New York: Dial Books, 2015

== Reception ==
Fitzpatrick's books have been generally well received.

My Life Next Door has been described as an "excellent first novel" that "movingly captures the intensity of first love, the corrupting forces of power, and the losses suffered by innocent victims caught in a web of political deceit." and "A summer romance with depth." Young adult author Lauren Morrill counted it as one of five books that most inspired her to write, stating "My Life Next Door is one of those books that I wish I’d written ... Huntley’s writing is nipping at my heels, pushing me to up the swoon factor." while Kirkus Reviews asserted "Fitzpatrick delivers an almost perfect summer romance." and "Though the resolution is rushed, it is also satisfying." The School Library Journal wrote "Summer romance fun with substance describes not only this novel but also its scrumptious male lead." and "The characters are dynamic and realistic. Strong narrative pacing adds to the whole sun-kissed package, which is on par with authors such as Sarah Dessen and Deb Caletti."

Kirkus Reviews in its review of What I thought was True wrote "What starts out as snappy chick-lit writing quickly becomes deeper and more complex." and found "natural dialogue and authentic characters abound." while Booklist called it "A must for collections that can't keep Sarah Dessen, Stephanie Perkins, or YA summer romance titles on the shelves." Publishers Weekly in a star review described it as a "thoughtful and genuine love story" and concluded that "Fitzpatrick (My Life Next Door) once again evokes the dizzying heights of adolescent passion while remaining down-to-earth. " and the School Library Journal wrote "This novel tells a beautiful story of first love" and "Those with regrets of their own will find hope in this coming-of-age romance that will appeal to fans of Deb Caletti and Sara Zarr."

The boy most likely to was called a "heartfelt companion to My Life Next Door" by Publishers Weekly and the School Library Journal wrote "This novel will speak to any teen who has ever had to make a hard decision. ... Fans of the previous volume will have a greater appreciation for this companion novel." The YoungFolks.com wrote "Although I probably won’t reread this book, I’m definitely going to be checking out Fitzpatrick’s other works." while Paste magazine described it as "your next great cry."
