= Stoneleigh-Burnham School =

Location
- 574 Bernardston Road; Greenfield, Massachusetts 01301; United States; 42°36′52.56″N 72°35′08.88″W

Information
- School type: independent school, secondary school, high school, middle school, boarding school, day school, girls' school
- Motto: Veritas Supra Omnia (Truth Above All)
- Established: 1869
- CEEB code: 220925
- Chair: Barbara Mayo Llewellyn ’69
- Head of school: Lauren Lambert
- Grades: 7–12 and PG
- Campus size: 100 acres (0.40 km^{2})
- Colors: blue & white
- Mascot: Athena the Owl
- Website: www.sbschool.org
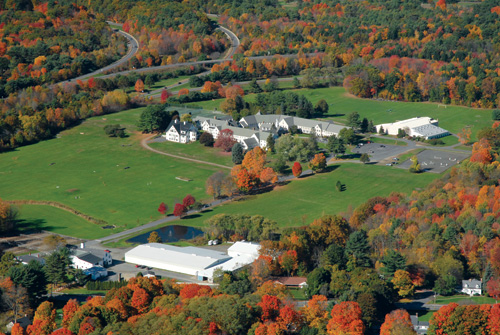
- Aerial view of the Stoneleigh-Burnham School campus

Stoneleigh-Burnham School (SBS) is a boarding and day school for girls in grades 7–12 and postgraduate year (PG Year). Founded in 1869, the school is the result of the merger of five founding schools. At present, the School is located on a 100-acre (0.40 km^{2}) campus in Greenfield, Massachusetts, United States, in the Pioneer Valley of New England in close proximity to the Five College Consortium.

SBS is affiliated with the International Coalition of Girls' Schools (ICGS), the National Association of Independent Schools (NAIS), the Association of Independent Schools in New England (AISNE), The Association of Boarding Schools (TABS), the Parents League of New York (PLNY), the Debating Association of New England Independent Schools (DANEIS), and the Interscholastic Equestrian Association (IEA).

SBS is accredited by the New England Association of Schools and Colleges (NEASC).
