= Frances Simpson Stevens =

American painter

Princess Dimitry Golitzine
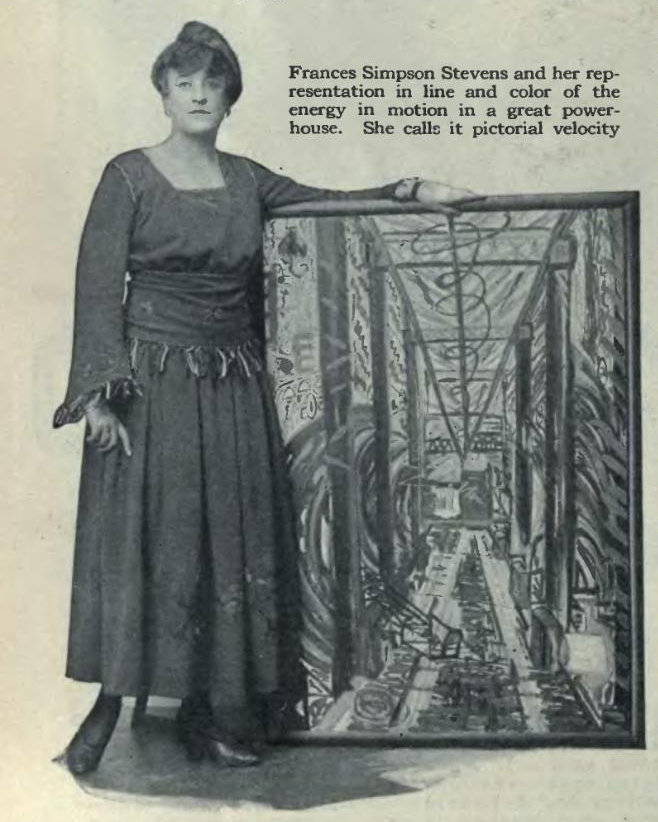
- Frances Simpson Stevens with artwork, 1917
- Born: Frances Simpson Stevens; 1894; Chicago, Illinois
- Died: July 18, 1976 (aged 81–82); California
- Education: Dana Hall School
- Spouse: Prince Dimitry Golitzine (m. 1919; died 1928)

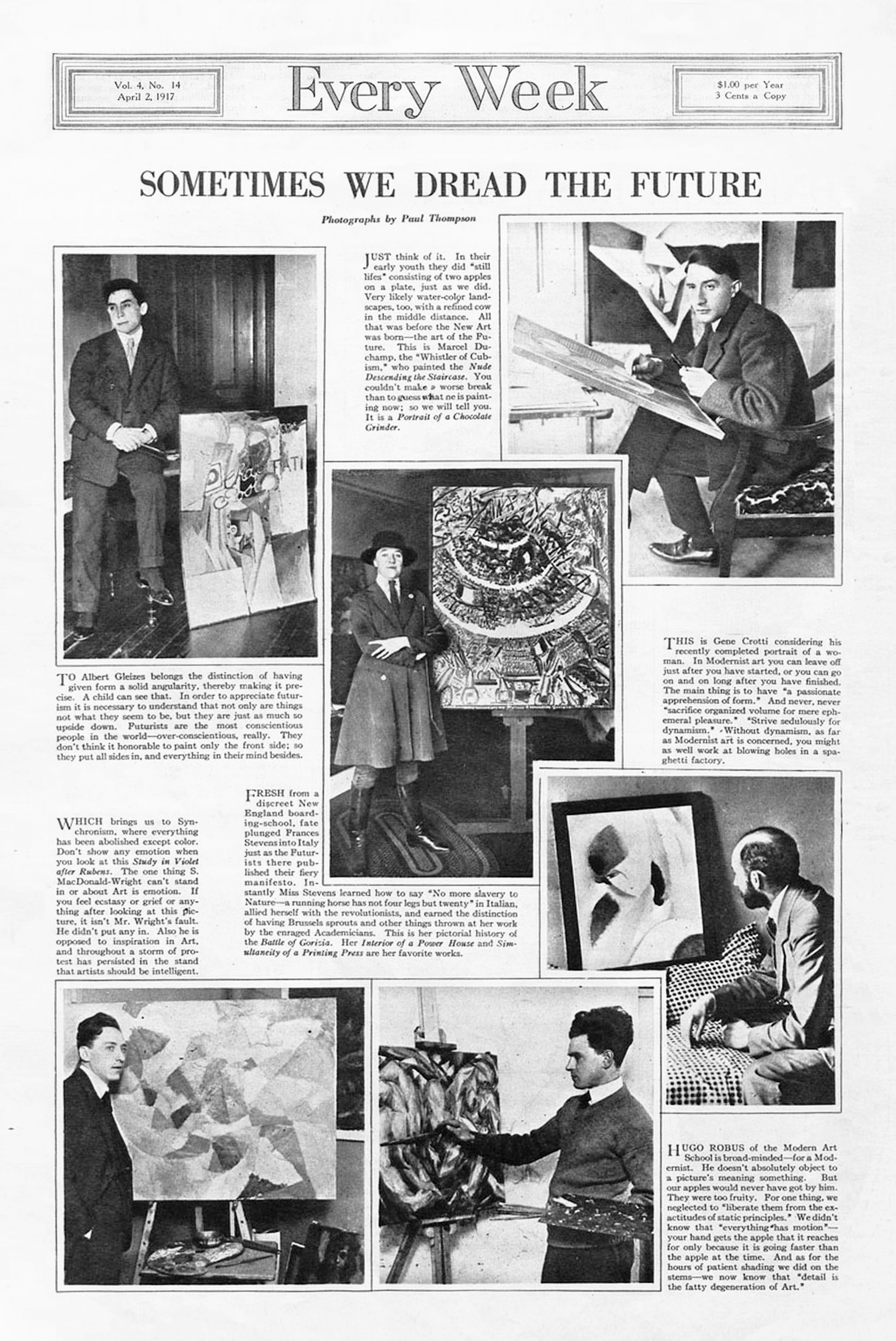
Frances Simpson Stevens with Battle of Gorizia (center), surrounded by (clockwise from top left) Albert Gleizes (with Chal Post, 1915); Marcel Duchamp (with his brother Jacques Villon's Portrait de M. J. B. peintre (Jacques Bon) 1914); Jean Crotti; Hugo Robus; Stanton Macdonald-Wright; Sometimes we dread the future, Every Week, Vol. 4, No. 14, April 2, 1917, p. 14

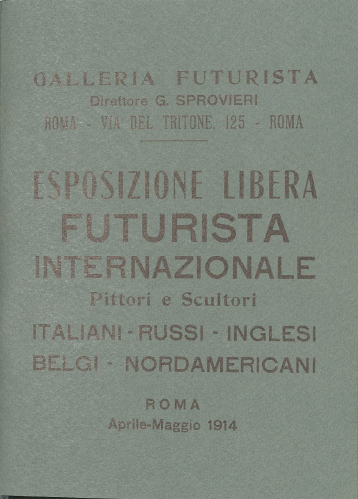
Rome, 1914

Frances Simpson Stevens (1894 – July 18, 1976) was an American painter, who is best remembered as one of the few Americans to directly participate in the Futurist Movement. Stevens was also one of the artists who exhibited at the landmark show Armory Show in New York City. The show included her oil painting Roof tops of Madrid ($200).

== Early life ==
Stevens was born and grew up in Chicago, Illinois. Her mother, Ellen Welles Stevens, could trace her ancestry back to 12th century England and passed down a lifetime "fascination with lineage." She was a descendant of Thomas Welles, the first Governor of the Colony of Connecticut.

She graduated from Dana Hall School in Wellesley, Massachusetts, and moved to New York City. In 1912 she attended a summer painting class taught by Robert Henri in Spain. It was there that she painted The roof tops of Madrid, the painting that she would exhibit a year later in the Armory Show, introducing America and Stevens into the concept of modern art.

== Career ==
Following the closing of the show, at the urging of Mabel Dodge, Stevens moved to Florence where she rented a studio from 1913 to 1914 with Mina Loy, who had asked Dodge to find her a boarder. Stevens and Loy became fixtures in the local art scene and it was there that they became acquainted with Marinetti and the Futurists. Stevens was the only American to exhibit at the 1914 Esposizione Libera Futurista Internazionale, where she showed eight works. Lacerba a futurist literary journal based out of Florence, Italy acknowledged Stevens in their writing for her exhibit.

Stevens was active in World War I, where she became involved in the Red Cross for the war effort. After leaving Europe she returned to New York where she published a series of cartoons in Rogue magazine. She also exhibited in New York, receiving a positive review in The New York Times.

=== Futurism ===
Stevens explicitly identified her work as futurist. In an article for The Popular Science Monthly, she articulated her vision:

"A futurist artist in Italy, seeing an ordinary street car go by, realizes the future possibilities of power and speed, and he begins to paint great trains going so fast that they lose their definite form in the lines of direction. Motion and light destroy the solidity of the material bodies... The futurists make their engines move, throb and create. Something is always happening in a futurist's pictures, and the great variety of color and changing lines helps to convey this impression." Frances Simpson Stevens, 1917

Very little of Stevens' art has survived. One work that has is Dynamic Velocity of Interborough Rapid Transit Power Station at the Philadelphia Museum of Art.

After her 1919 marriage, Stevens and her husband lived in Siberia for two years during the Russian Civil War. They were in Omsk while the Kolchak government was in power there, and later escaped from Vladivostok to Japan on the Russian warship Oriole, whose men were loyal to the Kerensky government. The couple returned to America, arriving in Boston on August 14, 1920, on the British steamship Persian Prince, via China.

Stevens apparently continued her artistic activities for at least some time after her return to New York.

== Personal life ==
Stevens was briefly engaged to Marchese Salimbeni in Florence Italy, but the engagement was discontinued due to World War 1 and Stevens moving back to America. On April 19, 1919, Frances married Prince Dimitry Golitzine (1882–1928), who was then the attaché to the Russian ambassador. The wedding was widely reported and American Art News identified him as a son of the last Prime Minister of Russia, Prince Nikolai Dmitriyevich Golitsyn. They had reportedly met at a dinner, when the Prince was attached to the Russian Embassy in Washington. They were married in a registrar's office. Frances was latterly styled Princess Dimitry Golitzine. After honeymooning in California, the couple departed for Vladivostok, where the Prince had a naval command, travelling by way of Japan. Frances was his second wife; his first wife was killed in 1918 in Russia, during the aftermath of the Russian Revolution.

Prince Dimitri Golitzine died on May 12, 1928, in Nice, France. Little is known about Stevens' life after her return to America. In 1961, she was admitted to Mendocino State Hospital in California and later died in a residential care home as a ward of the State of California on July 18, 1976.
