= Covenant Christian Academy (West Peabody, Massachusetts) =

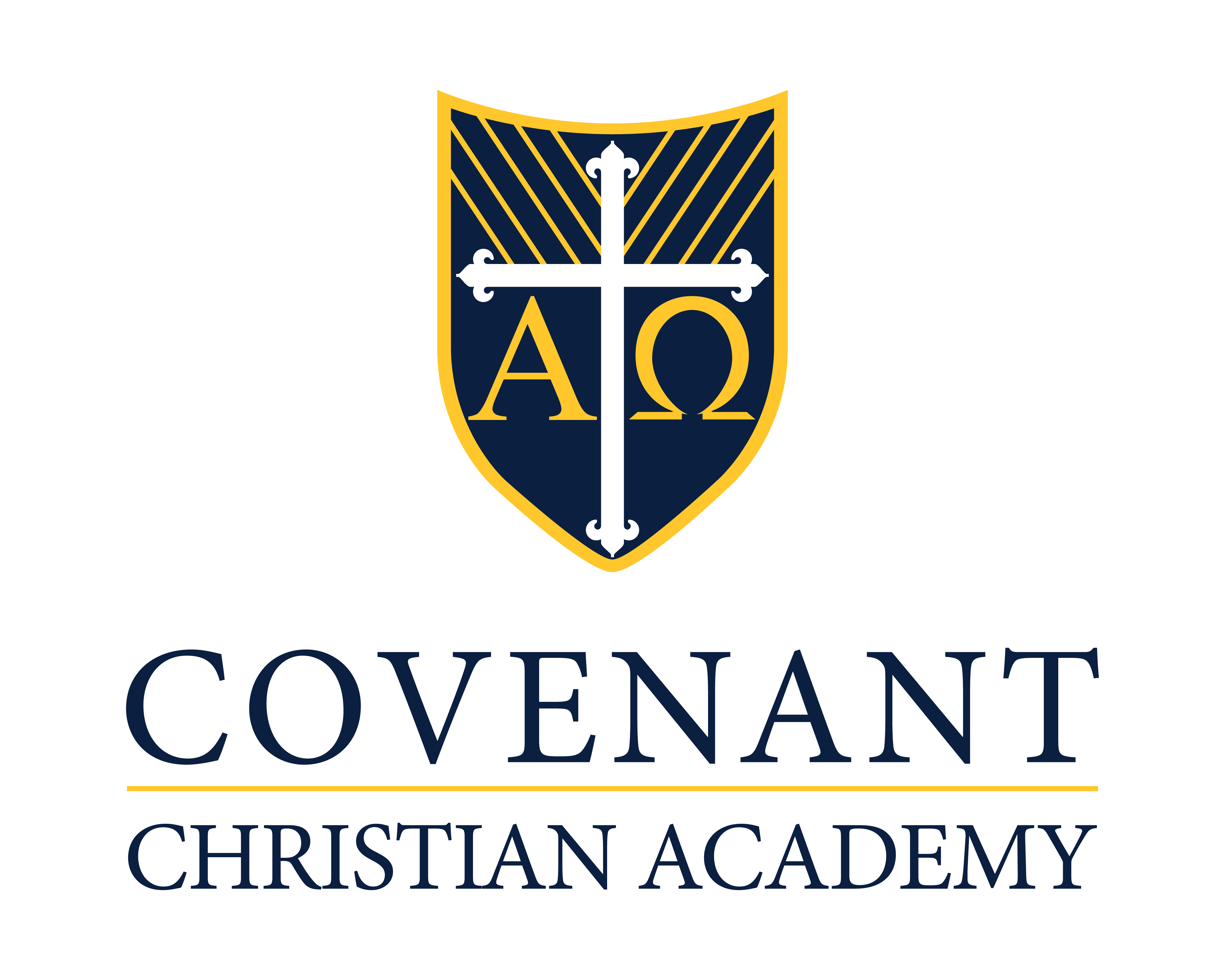

Location
- 83 Pine Street; West Peabody, Massachusetts 01960; United States; 42.5433°N 71.0020°W

Information
- School type: Private Christian and classical
- Motto: Dedicated to Excellence. Anchored in Truth.
- Denomination: Non-denominational Christian
- Established: 1991
- CEEB code: 222-299
- Head of school: David K. Anastasi
- Grades: Pre-K through grade 12
- Enrollment: 435
- Mascot: Cougar
- Website: www.covenantchristianacademy.org

Covenant Christian Academy (CCAQ) is a private Christian school and classical day school located in West Peabody, Massachusetts, USA, on the North Shore of Boston in Essex County. Founded in 1991, it is a college preparatory school, with over 430 students in pre-school through grade twelve, and draws students from over 45 cities and towns in Eastern Massachusetts and Southern New Hampshire.

== History ==
Covenant Christian School was founded in 1991 in Hamilton, Massachusetts. It began with students in pre-kindergarten through grade six. In 1993, the school moved to the Second Congregational Church in North Beverly with a student body of 35. In 1996, grades 7 and 8 were added to the program.

In 2001, a strategic plan was completed that included relocating to a new facility, expanding the lower grades to two sections each, and adding grades 9–12. In 2005, the board of directors voted unanimously to move the school to West Peabody, Massachusetts. CCA purchased and renovated the West Peabody Office Park, originally the John F. Kennedy Junior High School (part of Peabody Public Schools). CCA began meeting in the new facility on September 15, 2005. At this time, the name was changed from Covenant Christian School to Covenant Christian Academy. In September 2006, a high school program was added and 20 freshmen began classes.

On November 18, 2009, CCA was approved by the NEAS&C commission for accreditation. On December 12, 2009, CCA received approval for accreditation by the Association of Christian Schools International (ACSI).

On June 12, 2010, Covenant Christian Academy celebrated Commencement Exercises for the Class of 2010, the inaugural 12th grade class. By September 2016, enrollment climbed over 270 students, including ten international students, and Covenant Christian Academy entered its 25th year.

== Academics ==
Covenant Christian Academy holds institutional accreditation by the New England Association of Schools and Colleges (NEAS&C). The school is also recognized by the State of Massachusetts.

There are four schools within the academy: the Pre-School / Pre-Kindergarten (ages 3–5), the Grammar School (kindergarten through grade six), the Logic School (grades seven and eight), and the Rhetoric School (grades nine through twelve).

== Athletics ==
Athletic teams compete as a part of the New England Preparatory School Athletic Council, the Massachusetts Bay Independent League (MBIL) and the Independent Girls Conference (IGC). The athletic mascot of Covenant Christian Academy is the Cougar.

=== League championships ===
- Boys' soccer (MBIL D2) 2011, 2012, 2013, (MBIL D1) 2021
- Boys' basketball (MBIL D2) 2015, (MBIL D1) 2016
- Girls' soccer (IGC D2) 2018, 2019
- Girls' basketball (GIL D2) 2016, (IGC D2) 2018
- Girls' softball (GIL) 2015

== Affiliations ==
Covenant is accredited by the New England Association of Schools and Colleges and is a member of both the Association of Christian Schools International, and the Association of Classical Christian Schools. Athletic teams compete as a part of the New England Preparatory School Athletic Council, the Massachusetts Bay Independent League (MBIL), and the Independent Girls Conference (IGC).

== Leadership ==
Covenant Christian Academy is directed by a board of directors. David K. Anastasi is the Head of School.
