= My Life Next Door =

2012 novel by Huntley Fitzpatrick

- First edition
- Author: Huntley Fitzpatrick
- Language: English
- Genre: Young Adult, Romance
- Publisher: Dial Books
- ISBN: 9780142426043
- Followed by: The Boy Most Likely To

My Life Next Door is the first book in the ‘Stony Bay’ series by Huntley Fitzpatrick. It was initially published in 2012 and has since been republished in paperback, hardcover, and eBook versions. The ‘Stony Bay’ series is continued with a companion novel titled The Boy Most Likely To, which was published in 2015 and features characters from My Life Next Door.

== Background and publication history ==
Fitzpatrick recognized that some aspects of her characters in My Life Next Door come from the people around her, although no characters were based on any specific person, especially not her sister. She found inspiration for this book when going about her daily life, in everyday situations like visiting the beach or shopping, where she found herself scribbling notes and ideas down on old receipts. She credits a young couple who were laughing, teasing each other, and taking photographs together as a main inspiration for Samantha and Jase.

My Life Next Door was originally published by Dial, an imprint of Penguin Random House, on 14 June 2012 in hardback and eBook editions. The paperback was published by Speak, another imprint of Penguin Random House, almost a year later on 13 June 2013. On 7 January 2016, the My Life Next Door paperback was republished by Electric Monkey, an imprint of Egmont.

== Plot ==
Samantha Reed is a 17-year-old American teenager living in the fictional town of Stony Bay, Connecticut. After her father left when she was not born yet, Samantha's mother, Grace, threw herself into a career in politics which leads to her being State Senator when the story begins. Due to her mother's commitment to her career, Samantha and her sister Tracy are often pressured to be perfect. As the summer begins, Tracy leaves to work in Martha's Vineyard, leaving Samantha feeling abandoned and smothered by their mother.

After having a bad meeting with Clay, her mother's new campaign manager and boyfriend, Samantha retreats to her balcony where she's spent years watching her neighbors, the Garretts. As a family with eight children, Grace distanced herself and her daughters from them due to her belief that they are chaotic and irresponsible people. For Samantha however, the Garretts provided an escape from her boring, micro-managed life. Although she's spent years watching them, Samantha has never interacted with the Garretts because she doesn't want to disobey her mother. However whilst up there, Samantha meets one of the Garretts who climbs the tendrils to join her. The boy introduces himself as Jase Garrett, the third oldest child, and from this point, they begin growing closer as friends.

Over multiple occasions, Samantha is introduced to the other members of the Garrett family and is later asked by Mrs. Garrett to babysit the younger children, to which she agrees. This results in Jase and Samantha spending more time together and their friendship soon turns into a romantic relationship.

== Themes ==
=== Family ===
Family is heavily mentioned in this novel as we see a stark contrast between two families; the Reeds and the Garretts. On one side there is Samantha's family which is small, organized, and well managed, then there is Jase's family which is large, chaotic, and sometimes out-of-control. This novel displays both types of family, focusing on how the dynamics within them can differ.

=== Romance ===
First and foremost this book is categorized as a romance novel and includes elements that can be easily recognized as those of a light, summer romance. The relationship of Sam and Jase can be seen as an example of the classic first love scenario, however, this novel also deals with other romantic relationships that vary in maturity and significance.

=== Friendship ===
Friendship is a smaller theme in this novel as the friendship between Sam and Nan isn't always seen as a positive one and is more or less over by the end of the book. However, throughout the course of the novel, the friendship between Jase and Tim grows to the extent that Tim finds a support system within Jase's family.

=== Loyalty ===
The theme of loyalty is present in this novel as the protagonist (Sam) has to choose between her mother who is guilty and her boyfriend who is struggling to support his family as a result of her mother's actions. This introduces the idea of loyalty as it asks the question of where a person's natural loyalties should lie.

=== Personal growth ===
Throughout the course of the novel, Sam struggles to make her own decisions and pull away from the person her mother is trying to make her be to become herself. Her relationship with Jase helps her grow into a person that is more aware of the world and less reluctant to make mistakes. By the end of the novel, she is more concerned with doing what she believes is right rather than what she thinks is expected of her.

== Critical reception ==
The hardcover edition of My Life Next Door has a lifetime sales figure of 289 units in the United Kingdom, whereas the paperback edition has a lifetime sales figure of 2407 units in the United Kingdom. The republished paperback edition from Electric Monkey has a lifetime sales figure of 8601 units in the United Kingdom.

My Life Next Door has been described by Publishers Weekly as a book that ‘captures the intensity of first love, the corrupting forces of power, and the losses suffered by innocent victims caught in a web of political deceit’. My Life Next Door was described as a ‘summer romance with depth’ by The Boston Globe, and Kirkus Reviews dotes the book ‘an almost perfect summer romance’. It was also included on a list by Lauren Morrill, another YA author, who attributes it as one of five books that inspired her to write her own novels.

== Awards ==
- 2012 Publishers Weekly - Starred Review (*)
- 2013 Georgia Peach Book Award for Teen Readers - Young Adult (Nominee)
- 2013 Rita Award - First Book (Finalist)
- 2013 American Library Association - Best Fiction for Young Adults (Winner)
- 2014 Nevada Young Readers' Award - Young Adult (Nominee)
- 2015 Sequoyah Book Award - High School (Nominee)

== Translations ==
Translations
| Language | Title | Publisher | Format | Publication Date |
|---|---|---|---|---|
| Russian | Моя жизнь по соседству | Рипол Классик | Hardcover | 2017 |
| Russian | Моя жизнь по соседству | Рипол Классик | eBook | 2018 |
| French | Stony Bay Beach - Sam & Jase | Nathan | Paperback | 18 January 2018 |
| Italian | Quello che c'è tra noi | De Agostini | Paperback | 20 June 2017 |
| Italian | Quello che c'è tra noi | De Agostini | Hardcover | 17 June 2014 |
| Italian | Quello che c'è tra noi | De Agostini | eBook | 17 June 2014 |
| Turkish | Çat Kapı Aşk | Pegasus Yayınları | Paperback | 5 December 2016 |
| Czech | Můj život u sousedů | CooBoo | Hardcover | 4 August 2014 |
| Polish | Moje zycie obok | Zysk I S-ka | Paperback | 2016 |
| Portuguese | Minha Vida Mora ao Lado | Valentina | Paperback | 1 November 2015 |
| German | Mein Sommer nebenan | cbj Verlag | Hardcover | 15 April 2013 |
| German | Mein Sommer nebenan | cbj Verlag | eBook | 9 April 2013 |
| Lithuanian | Mano gyvenimas šalia | Alma littera | Hardcover | 2013 |
| Spanish | En la Puerta de al lado | Libros de Seda | Paperback | 1 June 2015 |
| Spanish | En la Puerta de al lado | Libros de Seda | eBook | 13 June 2015 |
| Hungarian | Életem a szomszédban | Könyvmolyképző | Paperback | 2015 |
