= Dorcas Brigham =

American botanist

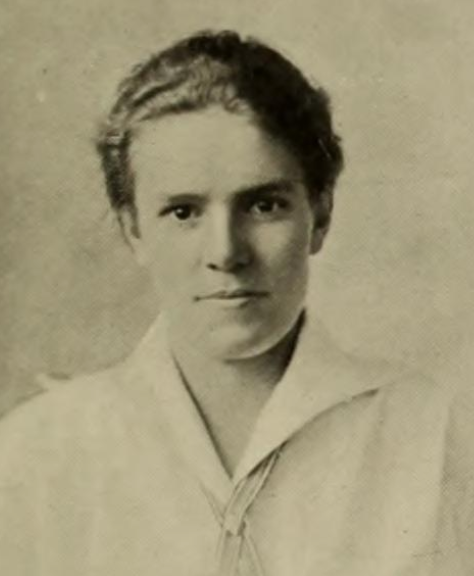
- Dorcas Brigham, from the 1918 Smith College yearbook
- Born: May 18, 1896; Newtonville, Massachusetts, US
- Died: February 14, 1986 (aged 89); Mount Dora, Florida, US
- Occupations: Botanist, horticulturist, farmer

Dorcas Brigham (May 18, 1896 – February 14, 1986) was an American botanist, horticulturist, and farmer.

== Early life and education ==
Brigham was born in Newtonville, Massachusetts, and raised in Springfield, Massachusetts, the daughter of Frank C. Brigham and Frances McFarlin Brigham. She graduated from Dana Hall School in 1914, and she graduated from Smith College in 1918.

== Career ==
In 1923, Brigham returned to Smith College as a botany professor. In 1928 and 1929, she taught at the Lawthorpe School of Landscape Architecture. In 1929, she and Dorthea Wallace Ward bought a 25-acre farm near Williamsburg, known as Village Hill Nursery. Brigham sold off the farm's livestock when Ward left to marry in 1939, but expanded the mail order business in herbs, adding a grape arbor, a greenhouse, and a pond. During World War II she oversaw the victory garden on the Smith campus.

Brigham retired around 1957, maintaining a mountaintop garden in Cashiers, North Carolina and spending the winter months in Mount Dora, Florida. She contributed an article to the Brooklyn Botanical Garden's Handbook on Herbs (1958). In 1959 she was awarded the Medal of Honor by the Herb Society of America. She led the local Audubon Society chapter in Mount Dora, and was president of the local Friends of the Library. She lectured to community groups, and led Audubon field trips to Corkscrew Swamp and Sanibel Island into the 1970s. She was a founding member of the Florida Native Plant Society in 1980.

== Personal life ==
Brigham traveled in her retirement, studying plant and animal life in Fiji, Australia, and Greece in her seventies. She died in 1986, aged 89 years, in Mount Dora. Her papers are in the Smith College archives.
