= Alice Balch Abbot =

American writer (1867–1937)

- Born: February 11, 1867; New York City, New York, U.S.
- Died: February 23, 1937 (aged 70); New York City, New York, U.S.
- Other names: Alice Balch Abbott (variant spelling)
- Occupation: Writer

Alice Balch Abbot (February 11, 1867 – February 23, 1937) was an American writer of fiction for young readers.

== Early life and education ==
Alice Balch Abbot was born in Brooklyn, New York, and raised in East Orange, New Jersey, the daughter of Abiel Abbot and Alice March Balch Abbot. She attended the Dana Hall School and graduated from Mount Holyoke College in 1889. Her younger sister Frances Holmes Abbot followed her, and graduated from the same college in 1894.

== Career ==
Abbot wrote short stories for the youth magazine St. Nicholas, and a novel for young readers, A Frigate's Namesake (1901). Of her story "Nan Merrifield's Choice" (1894), one reviewer commented that "Miss Abbot has constructed a stirring and touching story that whoso misses will lose the full appreciation of Abraham Lincoln that is the duty of all true Americans." Some of her published stories were illustrated by notable artists, including Francis Day and George Edmund Varian. She also contributed to a collaborative novel, A Novelty Novel (1889).

She was active in the Mount Holyoke Alumnae Association in New York City.

== Publications ==
- "Dee and Jay" (1893)
- "Nan Merrifield's Choice" (1894)
- "A Daughter of the Revolution" (1895)
- "How Cousin Marion Helped" (1897)
- A Frigate's Namesake (1901)
- "By Virtue of Phebe's Wit" (1902, 1909)

== Personal life ==
Abbot died in 1937, at the age of 70, at her home in New Brighton, Staten Island.
