= Jamie Dinan =

American investor

- Born: James Gerard Dinan; 1959 (age 66–67)
- Education: University of Pennsylvania; Harvard University
- Occupations: Businessman; philanthropist; investor
- Known for: Founding and managing York Capital Management; Owning the Milwaukee Bucks
- Spouse: Elizabeth R. Miller
- Children: 3

James Gerard Dinan (born 1959) is an American investor, hedge fund manager, and philanthropist. He founded York Capital Management in 1991.

== Early life and education ==
James Gerard Dinan was born to a Roman Catholic family in 1959 in Baltimore, Maryland, one of five children of Robert and Jeannette Dinan. His father was a textile engineer and his mother a homemaker. In 1969, the family moved to Paxton, Massachusetts. In 1977, Dinan graduated from the private Bancroft School. He then went on to earn a B.S. from the Wharton School of the University of Pennsylvania with a degree in economics in 1981. While at the University of Pennsylvania, Dinan joined Alpha Chi Rho, a northeastern fraternity. In 1981, he took a job with stock research firm, Donaldson, Lufkin & Jenrette (DLJ). In 1985, Dinan earned a M.B.A. from Harvard University.

== Investment career ==
In 1985, he took a job at the merger arbitrage firm Kellner DiLeo & Company. In 1987, the market crashed and he lost his entire $600,000 in savings. In 1991, he was able to raise $3.6 million from his former DLJ colleagues and started his own hedge fund named York Capital (named after the street he was then living on, York Avenue). In 1993, his fund earned credibility with a 33.8 percent return and by 2000, the fund had over $610 million in assets. In 2010, he sold 33% of York to Credit Suisse for $425 million. In 2011, he made a $1 million donation to the Museum of the City of New York. In July 2014, Dinan gained partial ownership of the NBA's Milwaukee Bucks. In June 2017, he named two eventual successors to lead York Capital in the future. In 2018, York Capital Management had $20.5 billion assets under management.

== Philanthropy ==
In 2024 after a large donation by Dinan to the University of Pennsylvania, his alma mater, Henry T. Vance Hall or simply Vance Hall, a major building within the Wharton Business School campus footprint was renamed Dinan Hall.

== Personal life ==
Dinan is married to Elizabeth R. Miller, and they have three children together, including racing driver Michael Dinan. Dinan lives in Manhattan and also owns homes in Westchester County, New York; Nantucket, Massachusetts; West Palm Beach, Florida and on the Caribbean island of Saint Barthélemy.

Sporting positions
| Preceded by Marc Lasry | Milwaukee Bucks principal owner 2023–present Served alongside: Wes Edens and Jimmy Haslam | Incumbent |
