= Association of Independent Schools in New England =

Association for independent schools in New England, USA

The Association of Independent Schools in New England (AISNE) is an association serving independent schools in New England, USA. It provides educational services such as downloadable materials and support for diversity programs, and represents its members to government, the media, etc. It also accredits elementary schools. As of 2005, it has over 160 members.

The AISNE is a member of the National Association of Independent Schools.

Members must

- be not-for-profit
- have an antidiscrimination statement
- have a board of directors
- be financially sound, with annual independent audits
- be accredited, either by AISNE itself (only elementary schools) or by the New England Association of Schools and Colleges

Member schools include: the Sage School, Applewild School, Academy Hill School, Boston University Academy, and Eaglebrook School.
