= York Capital Management =

Global hedge fund

York Capital Management LLC
- Type: Private
- Industry: Investment management
- Genre: Hedge fund
- Founded: September 1991; 35 years ago
- Founder: James Dinan
- Headquarters: 1330 Avenue of the Americas, 20th Floor, New York City, New York, U.S.
- Key people: James Dinan (Chairman and CEO)
- AUM: US$18.5 billion (as of June 30, 2019)
- Number of employees: 67 (2025)
- Website: yorkcapital.com

York Capital Management (York Capital) is an American investment management company, founded by James Dinan and headquartered in New York City.

== History ==
York Capital was founded in September 1991 by James Dinan, who named the firm after York Avenue, the New York City street where he resided at the time. The firm began operations with $3.6 million in assets under management, primarily raised from former colleagues at Donaldson, Lufkin & Jenrette, where Dinan had previously worked as an analyst and banker.

In 1993, Dinan hired Daniel Schwartz, then an investment banker at Morgan Stanley, as York Capital’s first employee. Schwartz later became the firm’s CIO. That same year, Dinan’s flagship fund achieved a 33.8% return, which helped attract institutional investors.

By 2000, York Capital had grown to manage $610 million in AUM. The firm experienced significant volatility in 2002, recording a 7.1% loss — its first annual decline — due to investments in companies later embroiled in accounting scandals, including Tyco International, Adelphia Communications, and WorldCom. Despite the setback, Dinan retained key employees by offering them stakes in the firm’s performance fees, which contributed to a 33.3% rebound in returns by 2003.

In 2006, York Capital entered into an agreement to acquire Psagot Ofek Investment House Ltd., a Tel Aviv-based firm managing more than 50 mutual funds, for approximately $310 million. The transaction, which was scheduled to close in September 2006, marked York Capital’s first major expansion into international markets and aimed to diversify its investment offerings. Psagot Ofek’s operations focused on Israeli financial markets, and the acquisition aligned with York Capital’s broader strategy to establish a global presence, including prior expansions into Europe and planned initiatives in Asia.

The firm reported a 26.4% loss in 2008 during the global financial crisis, followed by a 39.7% return in 2009.

On September 14, 2010, Credit Suisse announced an agreement to acquire a one-third minority stake in York Capital for $425 million. Under the deal terms, Credit Suisse committed to not investing its own capital directly into York Capital’s funds but planned to market York Capital’s products to its clients. The bank also noted potential future “earn-out” payments tied to York Capital’s five-year financial performance. Founder and senior executives, including Jamie Dinan, York Capital’s founder and then-chairman, signed retention agreements with Credit Suisse. York Capital had grown to manage $14 billion in AUM.

On June 3, 2024, York Private Equity sold Renuity, a technology-driven home services platform, to Greenbriar Equity Group.

On February 19, 2025, York Capital provided financial backing for a management-led acquisition of a majority stake in Soccer Post, a soccer retail chain, from TZP Group.

== Investment strategies ==
York Capital uses a fundamental analysis, bottom-up approach to make its investments. The firm focuses on three event-driven investing strategies: merger and acquisition transactions, distressed securities and restructuring opportunities and special situation equity investing.

== York Capital Funds ==
Global Multi-Strategy Funds

- York Multi-Strategy
- York Select
- York Total Return

Distressed Opportunities Funds

- York Credit
- York Credit Income

Regional Multi-Strategy Funds

- York European Opportunities
- York Asian Opportunities
