= Dana Hall School =

Prep school in Wellesley, Massachusetts, US

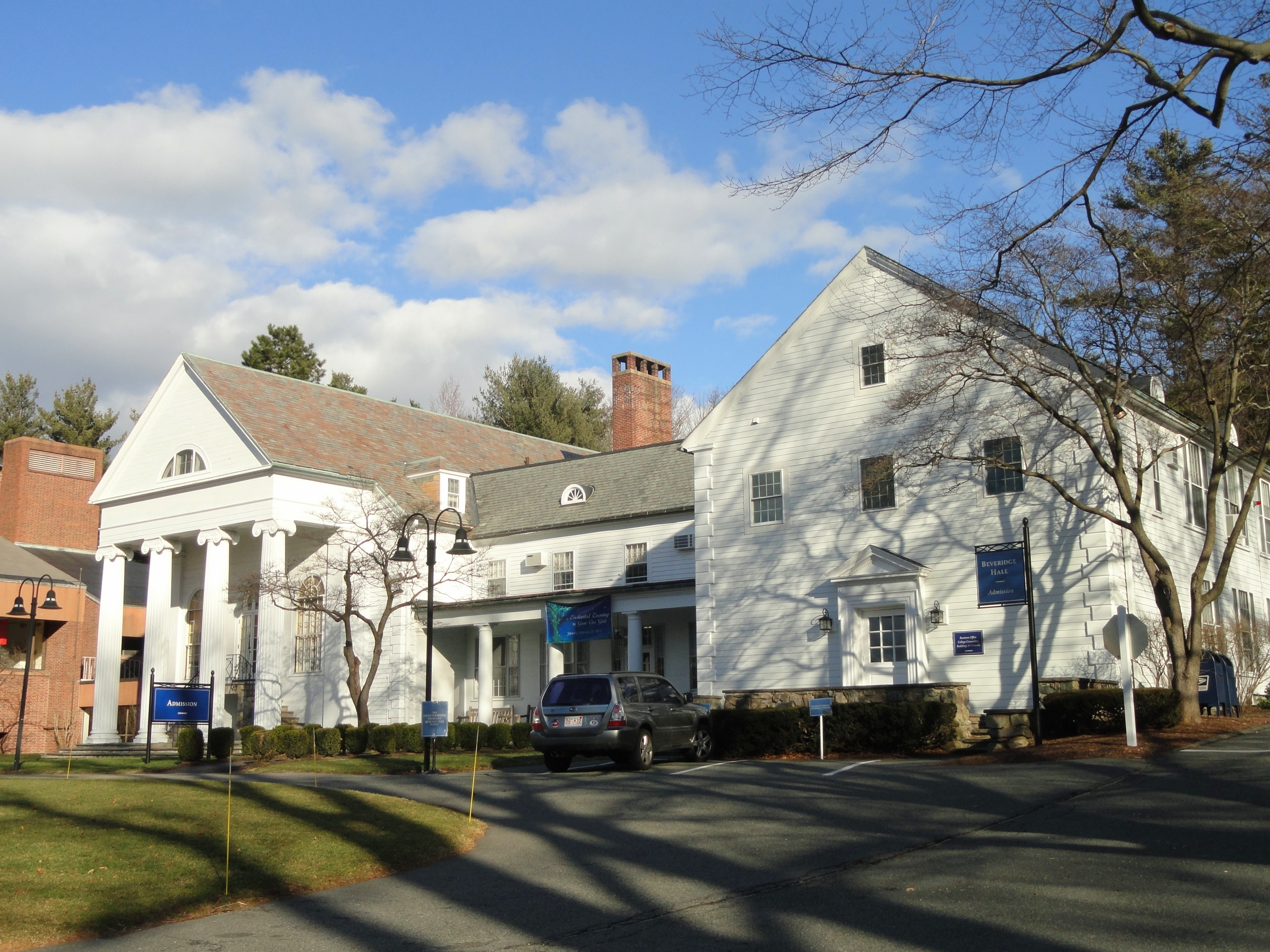

Location
- 45 Dana Road; Wellesley, Massachusetts 02181; United States; 42°17′41″N 71°17′28″W

Information
- Type: Private
- Motto: Amor Caritas
- Established: 1881; 145 years ago
- Head of school: Katherine Bradley
- Grades: 5-12
- Campus size: 52 acres (210,000 m^{2})
- Campus type: Suburban
- Colors: Blue and white
- Athletics conference: Eastern Independent League
- Mascot: Dragon
- Rival: Newton Country Day School
- Website: www.danahall.org

The Dana Hall School is an independent boarding and day school for girls in grades 5-12 located in Wellesley, Massachusetts. Founded in 1881 by Henry F. Durant, Dana Hall originally served as Wellesley College's preparatory program.

== Tuition ==
Tuition for the 2026–2027 academic year is $79,925 for boarding students and $65,765 for day students.

== History ==
In 1871, Charles Blanchard Dana purchased the old Wellesley Square Congregational Church and moved it to his property at what later became 66 Grove Street. It was first used as a boarding house called Dana Hall and in 1879, Dana gave it to his friend and founder of Wellesley College, Henry Fowle Durant, to use as a Wellesley College dormitory for the “Teacher Specials,” older women who came to Wellesley to continue their studies. In 1880, Henry Durant persuaded teachers and sisters Julia and Sarah Eastman to help him found the Dana Hall School as a feeder school for Wellesley College.

Dana Hall opened in 1881, with the first classes held on September 8, six years to the day after Wellesley College opened. Katharine Lee Bates, author of "America the Beautiful," taught at the school from 1881 until 1885.

In 1882, a south wing was added onto the Dana Main Building, including a schoolroom, gymnasium, recitation rooms, and dormitory rooms. A north wing was later added in 1893. In 1902, an extensive addition was added to Dana Main, including a massive Living Room, with a new Dining Room below and the Court between. Also added was the French Dining Room. New dormitory rooms were added on the floors above. In 1905, the Eastman Reference Library, a gift of the class of 1905, was built inside Dana Main. A new gymnasium was built connected to Dana Main in 1912. Dana Main remained part of campus until 1972 when it was demolished.

Like many boarding schools, Dana Hall has a long list of traditions and rituals that date back to its founding. The first reference to Dana Hall's MidWinter tradition was noted in the 1885 Class History, and the first reference to a school color, "Dana Hall blue" was in 1890. The first class pin was noted in the 1892 Class History. The Class of 1895 was first class to plant a tree for Dana's Tree Day tradition. In 1903, two major Dana Hall traditions were introduced: Field Day and Step Sing.

Dana Hall School's first reunion occurred in 1897, with 130 alumnae returning to campus. The same year, the Dana Hall Association for Alumnae was formed with 150 members. The first Dana Hall Association Quarterly was published in 1912.

In 1898, the Eastman sisters retired after 17 years at the School. On May 27, 1898, they formed an agreement to sell the School to Helen Temple Cooke and Marcellus Wheeler for $60,000.

The same year, the first "yearbook," The Tattler, 1902 was published. The yearbook was later renamed to The Focus in 1940. This first edition of The Tattler includes the first mentions of a ceremonial Spade and of the Athletic Association. In 1902, the 13-member Senior Society (later Tau Kappa Delta, or TKD) was founded.

The Dana Hall seal was designed in 1909 by George T. Abell of Wellesley, based on the Amor Caritas of Augustus Saint-Gaudens.

Helen Temple Cooke founded another boarding school, the Tenacre School, for girls in grades 8–9 in 1910. She also founded the Post-Graduate Department of Dana Hall (later known as Pine Manor beginning in 1917) and built a home (Pine Manor House) for the 28 pupils who enrolled for September 1911. Tenacre, Dana Hall, and the Post-Graduate Department merged later in 1911 to form the Dana Hall Schools. In 1930, Pine Manor received a charter as an independent junior college by the American Association of Junior Colleges and became Pine Manor Junior College. A residence for Helen Temple Cooke, Grove House, was built in 1914. This is still the residence for Dana's Head of School.

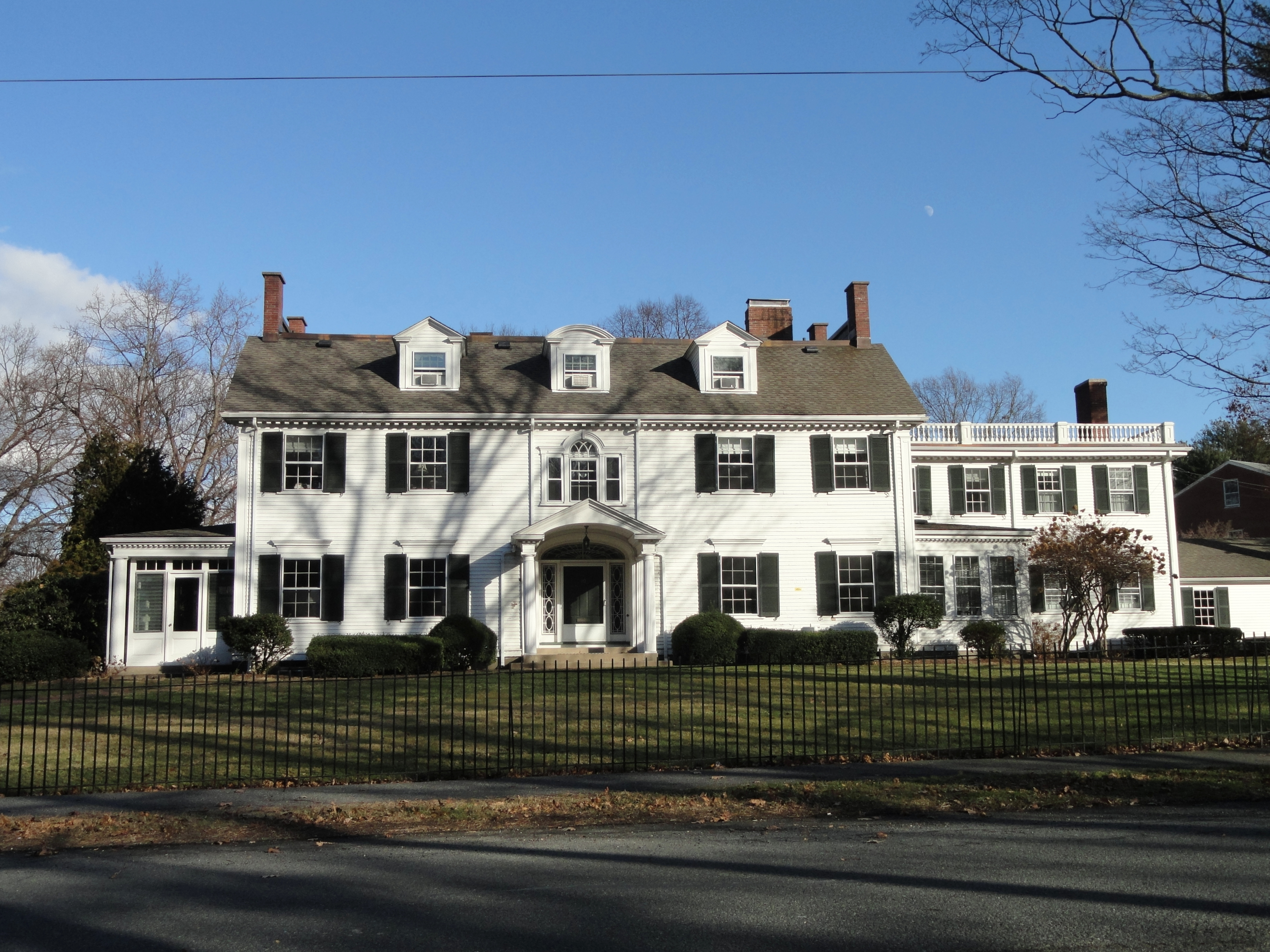
Grove House: the residence for Dana Hall's Head of School.

In 1921, a Christmas Pageant, Saint Francis Keeps Christmas at Greccio, 1223, led by English teacher Constance Grosvenor Alexander, was performed. This pageant became the predecessor for Dana's modern Revels tradition.

The Class Ring, an important rite of passage for Dana Hall students, was standardized in 1923. The Class of 1924 were the first to wear it and thereafter three stone colors - red, black, and green, were used successively to coordinate with class colors.

In 1927, the Dana Hall Riding Club was formed by riding instructor, Frederik Boswell. The same year, Marcellus E. Wheeler, Helen Temple Cooke's business partner since 1898 died, leaving her the majority ownership of the school. In 1929, the son of Charles B. Dana, Arthur P. Dana, sold Cooke the remainder of the Dana estate, including all the land between Grove House and 160 Grove Street (now Maple Manor).

The Bardwell Auditorium was also built in 1929, commencing a series of concerts, lectures, and readings for students.

Helen Temple Cooke remained the primary owner of the school until 1938 when she donated her interest and much of her property to Dana Hall. The same year, Dana Hall became a non-profit corporation called The Dana Hall Schools, and a board of trustees was formed to oversee its affairs. The first alumnae to serve on the Board was Ellen (Sahlin) Hartshorn class of 1913. Cooke and the trustees decided that the School (now a non-profit corporation) would give a gift of $28,000 in lieu of taxes to the Town of Wellesley. Cooke had been the largest taxpayer in Wellesley and wished to bear her "share of expenses."

Dana Hall's first newspaper, the Bulletin, began in February 1939. The newspaper was later renamed to the Dana Hallmanac with Volume I, no. 1 published in March 1945. Also in 1939, a Student Government Association was created in which all students were members and elected a president and executive council to better represent the entire student body.

In 1941, a voluntary Alumnae Fund was established to build an endowment and free the school of debt. Reunions began to be offered annually with the help of class agents to draw funds.

The first Dana Hall May Day tradition was celebrated in 1942, continuing until 1965 when the last May Queen was crowned. The same year in 1942, the school closed for over a month between December and February to minimize student travel during war time. Spring vacation was eliminated in 1943 to comply with a request from the railroads to conserve fuel. In 1945, a Dana Hall chapter of the League of Women Voters was formed, along with a student lead Inter-Racial Club.

Helen Temple Cooke retired in 1951 after 53 years as the Head of the Dana Hall Schools, but retained her position as the President of the Board of Trustees until she died on April 12, 1955, on the eve of her 90th birthday.

A new classroom building, including a new library, was built in 1956 as Dana marked its 75th anniversary in September. An Art and Science wing was added in 1957.

A reorganization of the School was announced in 1962, forming an Upper Division (grades 9–12) with boarding students and a Lower Division (grades 7–8) with only day students. The same year, Pine Manor became independent of Dana Hall and left Wellesley for the Dane Estate in Chestnut Hill by September 1, 1964.

In 1970, under pressure from shifting beliefs about gender segregated learning, Dana Hall experimented with co-ed classrooms. For nine weeks, 60 Dana students and 53 male students from St. Pauls School in New Hampshire participated in a co-educational exchange from January to March. When Dana students and parents reported negatively on their co-ed experience, the program was scrapped. After much review and complications, the Board of Trustees officially stated the School's intention to continue to be a college preparatory school exclusively for young women in 1976.

In 1992, one of the first gay-straight alliances in Massachusetts was established by Dana students with Latin teacher Jacqui Bloomberg as its faculty advisor. The same year, a Women of Color Club was established, later renamed to SHADES ("Sisters Honoring All Diasporas and Enlightening Society") in 1998.

In 1998, the Lucia Farrington Shipley Science Center, a new Helen Temple Cooke Library, and the newly renovated Middle School were opened. In 2004, the Shipley Center for Athletics, Health, and Wellness was opened after the School received its largest financial gift in its history, a commitment of $5 million from Lucia (Farrington) Shipley class of 1938.

In 2013, the Riding Center was renamed The Karen Stives '68 Equestrian Riding Center in appreciation of alumnae and Olympic Gold Medalist Karen (Wennbergh) Stives’ $3.5 million gift.

In 2016, a fifth grade class of 14 students was added to Dana Hall's Middle School.

On March 12, 2020, in the midst of the world-wide COVID-19 pandemic, administrators decided to not re-open in person learning after March break. Virtual learning began on March 26, 2020, and continued until March 2021.

As of 2026, the Dana Hall Schools support 320 Upper School students and 133 Middle School students. There are 100 boarding students.

== Notable alumnae ==
- Princess Aisha bint Al Hussein (1986), princess of Jordan
- Alice Balch Abbot (1880s), children's writer
- Dorcas Brigham (1914), botanist and horticulturist
- Margaret Wise Brown (1928), children's author of Goodnight Moon
- Rosario Ferré (1956), author, contributing editor of The San Juan Star, and former First Lady of Puerto Rico
- Nina Garcia (1983), fashion director at Elle magazine, judge on Project Runway, and author
- Helen Hartness Flanders (1909), folklorist
- Busty Heart, entertainment personality
- Ange Kagame (2011), First Daughter of Rwanda
- Opal Kunz (1914), aviator
- María Corina Machado (1985), Venezuelan activist and politician, winner of the 2025 Nobel Peace Prize
- Lila Mayoral, former First Lady of Puerto Rico
- Alley Mills, actress
- Sharon Olds (1960), Pulitzer Prize-winning poet
- Madelyn Renee, soprano opera singer
- Hillary Bailey Smith (1976), Daytime Emmy-winning soap opera actress
- Frances Simpson Stevens (1911), painter associated with the Futurist movement
- Karen Stives (1968), gold and silver equestrian medalist at the 1984 Olympics
- Latanya Sweeney (1977), computer scientist known for her work in data privacy
- Alexandra Wentworth (1983), actress and comedian

== See also ==
- Pine Manor College
