= Pingree School =

School in South Hamilton, Massachusetts, US

Coordinates: 42°38′18.7″N 70°52′51.0″W

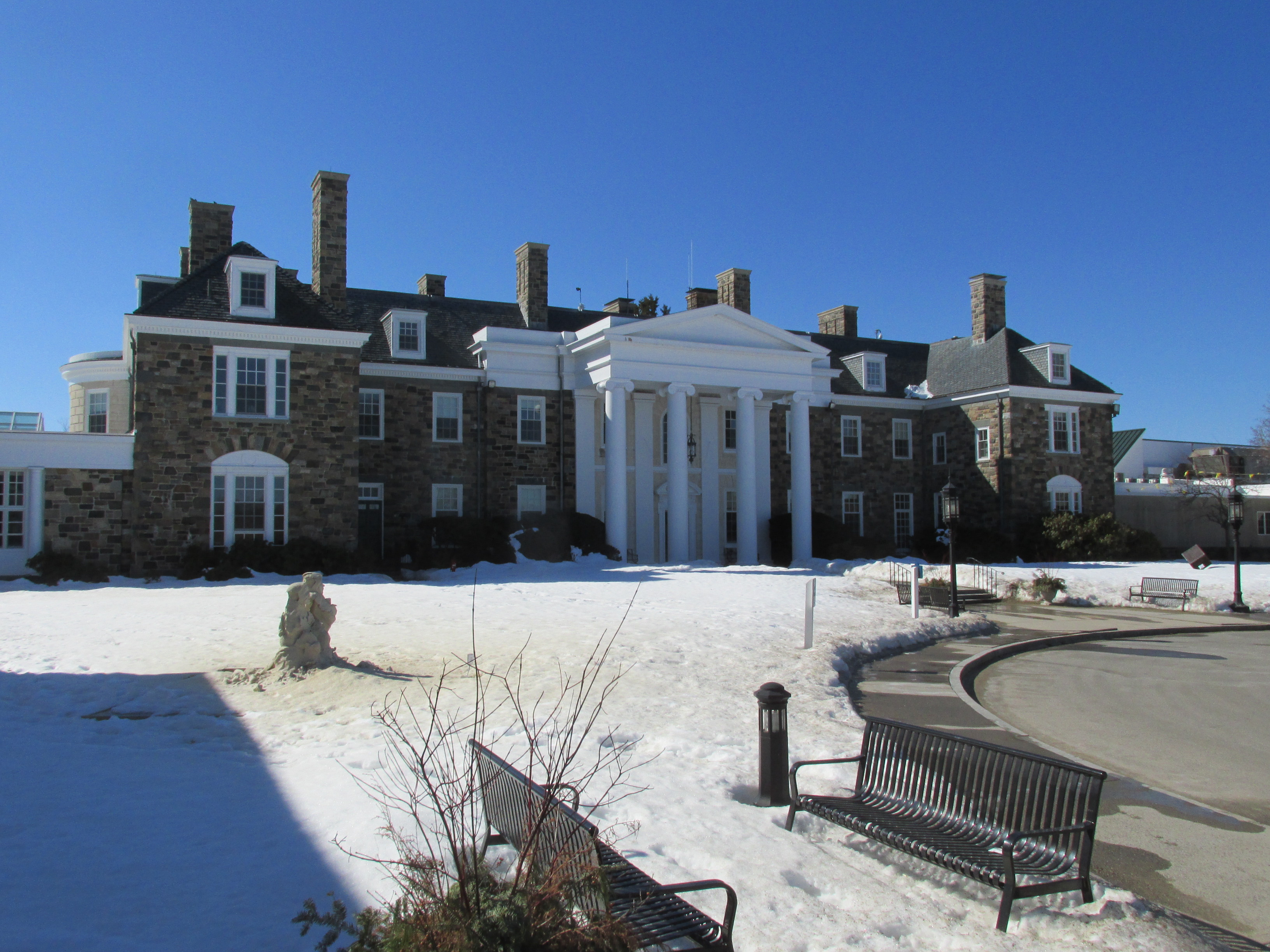
- Pingree School
- South Hamilton, Massachusetts; United States

Information
- School type: Private secondary
- Established: 1961
- Head of school: Timothy Johnson
- Grades: 9–12
- Enrollment: 383
- Colors: Navy, white, and green
- Mascot: Highlander
- Newspaper: The Highlander
- Website: www.pingree.org

Pingree School is a coeducational, independent secondary day school located in South Hamilton, Massachusetts, serving the area north and east of Boston. Its students commute from 50 cities and towns, from as far south as Everett, as far north as Hampton and as far west as the Merrimack Valley. It has a 12% acceptance rate for the 2024-2025 academic year, making it a highly selective school. There are around 400 applicants yearly, and only 88-92 spots are available.

== Tuition ==
Tuition for the 2023-2024 academic year is $56,250.

== Notable alumni ==
- Ryan Serhant, real estate broker and reality television actor.

== See also ==
- Eastern Independent League
- List of high schools in Massachusetts
