= Inly School =

Location
- 46 Watch Hill Drive; Scituate, Massachusetts 02066; United States

Information
- School type: Private Coeducational Montessori
- Founded: 1973 (as The Montessori Community School)
- Status: Open
- Head of school: Neal Brown
- Grades: Toddlers, Preschool and K-8
- Age range: 18 months to 14 years
- Language: English
- Classrooms: Toddler House, Children's House (Preschool and Kindergarten), Lower Elementary (Grades 1–3), Upper Elementary (Grades 4–6), Middle School (Grades 7–8)
- Campus size: 10 acres (40,000 m^{2})
- Campus type: Suburb
- Slogan: An Innovative Montessori Community
- Rival: Outly
- Website: www.inlyschool.org

Inly School is a private, independent pre K–8 Montessori school in Scituate, Massachusetts, 25 miles (40 km) south of Boston for students in toddler and preschool through 8th grade. It serves students from 20 towns on the South Shore of Boston and beyond, including Cohasset, Hingham, Norwell, Hull, Marshfield, Hanover, Pembroke, and Plymouth.

One space included in Inly’s campus is the Artsbarn, which is used for performing arts, sports, assemblies. As well as indoor spaces, there exists an outdoor space named the Outdoor Classroom, used for science, nature classes, and experiential learning. The campus also includes multiple playgrounds, sports fields, a Spartan obstacle course, and nature trails. The center of campus houses an Innovation Lab called the da Vinci Studio, a Think Tank, Destination Exploration stations, a new library, and other classroom spaces.
