= Applewild School =

Location
- 120 Prospect Street; Fitchburg, Massachusetts 01420; United States
- Coordinates: 42.5927°N 71.8087°W

Information
- Funding type: Private
- Religious affiliation: Non-sectarian
- Founder: 1957
- NCES School ID: 00605141
- Head of school: Amy Jolly
- Staff: 20
- Faculty: 30
- Grades: PreK-9
- Gender: Co-educational
- Enrollment: 200
- Average class size: 15
- Student to teacher ratio: 6
- Campus size: 26 acres
- Colours: Green and White
- Accreditation: Association of Independent Schools of New England
- Tuition: Call School
- Affiliations: National Association of Independent Schools
- Website: www.applewild.org

Applewild School is an independent, coeducational, day and junior boarding school centrally located in Fitchburg, Massachusetts. Founded in 1957, it has approximately 200 students aged 4 to 15, with a Preschool for children 2.9 years and older on two locations: the Main Campus is located in Fitchburg, Massachusetts and Applewild Preschool at Devens is located in Devens, Massachusetts. The average class size is 14 students. The school's motto is "A Belief in the Future." The school is accredited by the Association of Independent Schools of New England and belongs to the National Association of Independent Schools.

== Campus and facilities ==
Applewild School sits on a 26-acre (110,000 m^{2}) campus in the Massachusetts countryside, with seven buildings. The campus is located on a hill next to a Massachusetts Audubon Society wildlife sanctuary (Flat Rock) and abuts the North County Land Trust's Crocker Conservation Land.

As well as the usual school facilities, the school has two centers for woodworking and shop, a ceramics studio and a 400-seat performing arts center.

== Interscholastic Teams ==
- Soccer, Field Hockey, Basketball, Lacrosse, Cross-Country and Track, and recently skiing
