= Concord Academy =

Private school in Concord, Massachusetts, US

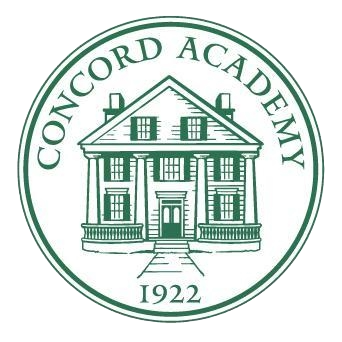

Location
- 166 Main Street; Concord, Massachusetts 01742; United States; 42°27′33″N 71°21′17″W

Information
- School type: Private, Day & Boarding
- Established: 1919 (incorporated 1922)
- Status: Open
- Head of school: Henry Fairfax
- Faculty: 68
- Gender: Co-educational
- Enrollment: 419 (2023–24)
- Student to teacher ratio: 6:1
- Campus size: 39 acres (16 ha)
- Colors: Green and white
- Athletics conference: Eastern Independent League
- Mascot: Chameleon
- Publication: The Centipede
- Website: www.concordacademy.org

Concord Academy (also known as CA) is a coeducational, independent college-preparatory school for boarding and day students in Concord, Massachusetts. CA educates approximately 400 students in grades 9–12.

Founded in 1922 as an all-girls institution, CA transitioned to a coeducation model in 1971. It has educated several Pulitzer Prize winners, notable authors, artists, and scholars, including the first female president of Harvard University, Drew Gilpin Faust.

== History ==
=== All-girls school ===
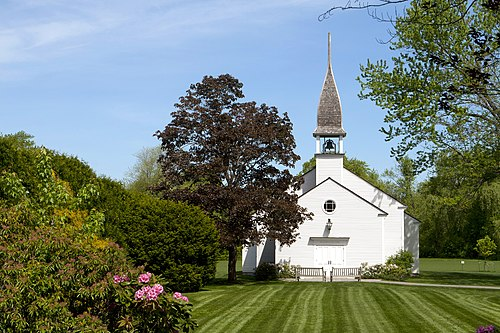
A view of Elizabeth B. Hall Chapel at Concord Academy

Concord Academy was founded in 1919 by local residents Anne Bixby Chamberlin, a Wellesley College graduate, and Mrs. Henry F. Smith, Jr. Chamberlin, who had six daughters and two sons, was concerned that the closest high school for girls (Winsor School) was 20 miles away in the city of Boston. By contrast, her sons could attend Concord's Middlesex School, the all-boys high school where her husband worked.

In 1922, Chamberlin and Smith transferred control over the fledgling school to a board of trustees, who reorganized CA as a non-profit corporation. The reconfigured Concord Academy's aims were explicitly college-preparatory, which was unusual for a girls' school at the time, and the administration warned that "[p]upils with definitely low scholastic aptitude ought to be in a different type of school." The trustees hired Elsie Garland Hobson, a 1916 Ph.D. graduate of the University of Chicago, as the first permanent headmistress. To raise money, the trustees added a small boarding department, which charged the then-astronomical sum of $1,500 a year. (For comparison, in 1922 the University of Pennsylvania charged $675 for tuition, room, and board, and even the pricier all-boys boarding schools charged around $1,200.) Even so, for most of CA's early history, day students significantly outnumbered boarders. The school's financial situation remained tenuous even after the Great Depression, and in the 1949–50 school year, the school recorded the largest financial loss in its history.

The school reached national stature under heads of school Elizabeth Blodgett Hall (1949–63) and David Aloian (1963–71). CA's expansion during this period was fueled almost exclusively by tuition money and project-specific donations; when Hall stepped down in 1963, the financial endowment stood at just $112,000. (The endowment would not reach $1 million until 1981.) To finance her aspirations for CA, Hall aggressively courted wealthy, high-achieving boarding students from across the globe. Enrollment reached 200 by 1954, but was outpaced by applications for the boarding program, which received four applications for every opening by the early 1960s and comprised 58% of the school by 1966. To accommodate more boarders, CA discontinued its lower grades (which admitted only day students) in 1961.

In 1971, Harvard's student newspaper reported that Concord Academy "sits at the top of the pile in terms of popularity."

=== Shift to coeducation ===
In the 1960s and 1970s, Concord Academy was confronted with two major issues: the American upper class' decreasing interest in boarding schools, which caused an industry-wide shortfall of tuition dollars, and the fact that most boys' boarding schools were shifting to coeducation, "which meant that fathers who had attended them could now send their daughters to their alma maters."

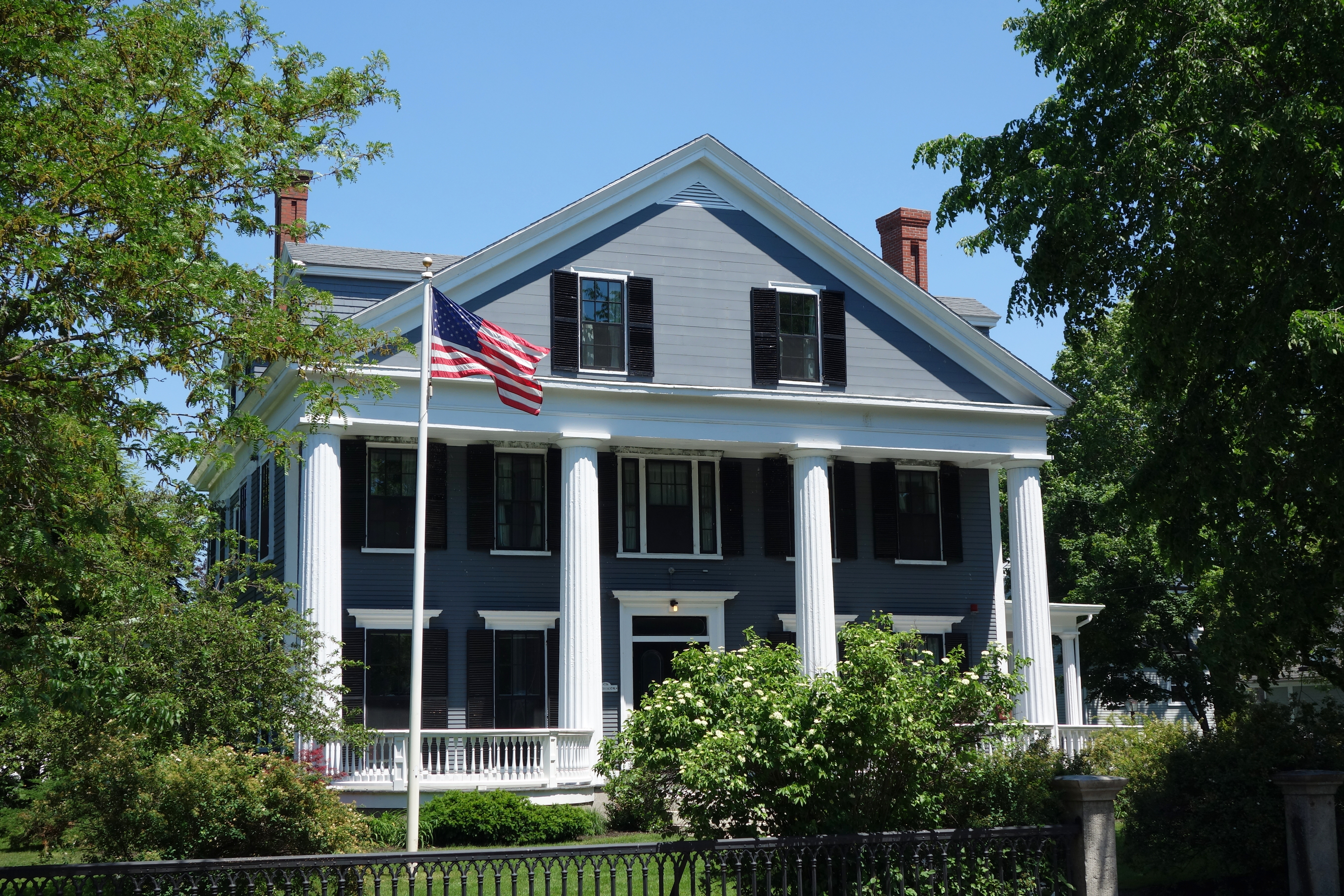
Haines House

Several boys' boarding schools (including Exeter, Groton, St. Paul's, and neighboring Middlesex) sought closer ties with CA, either as a sister school or as a prelude to absorbing CA entirely. CA students had been participating in Groton's theatrical productions (and vice versa) since the 1950s and also attended some of its campus programming, but large-scale academic cooperation had never occurred before. In 1968, CA, Groton, and Middlesex considered an academic exchange program, but the proposal was "quickly rejected as impractical" for logistical reasons, the towns of Concord and Groton being 20 miles apart. Groton's alternative proposal to relocate CA to the town of Groton was also declined. A two-week exchange program with New Hampshire-based St. Paul's School made The New York Times but did not result in closer cooperation.

In 1971, Concord Academy became the first all-girls' boarding school in New England to shift to a coeducational model. Faced with competition for talented girls from the formerly all-boys' schools, CA administrators sought to maintain the quality of the student body by expanding the size of its applicant pool. In addition, CA's consultants projected that the school's operating deficit would increase significantly without the addition of boys.

=== Coeducational era ===
The school's academic reputation allowed it to survive the growing pains of coeducation. A 1996 study found that 29% of CA graduates went on to Ivy League colleges, tied with Phillips Exeter Academy for fifth among Northeastern boarding schools. CA also ranked sixth among Northeastern boarding schools in 2015 for its students' average SAT scores.

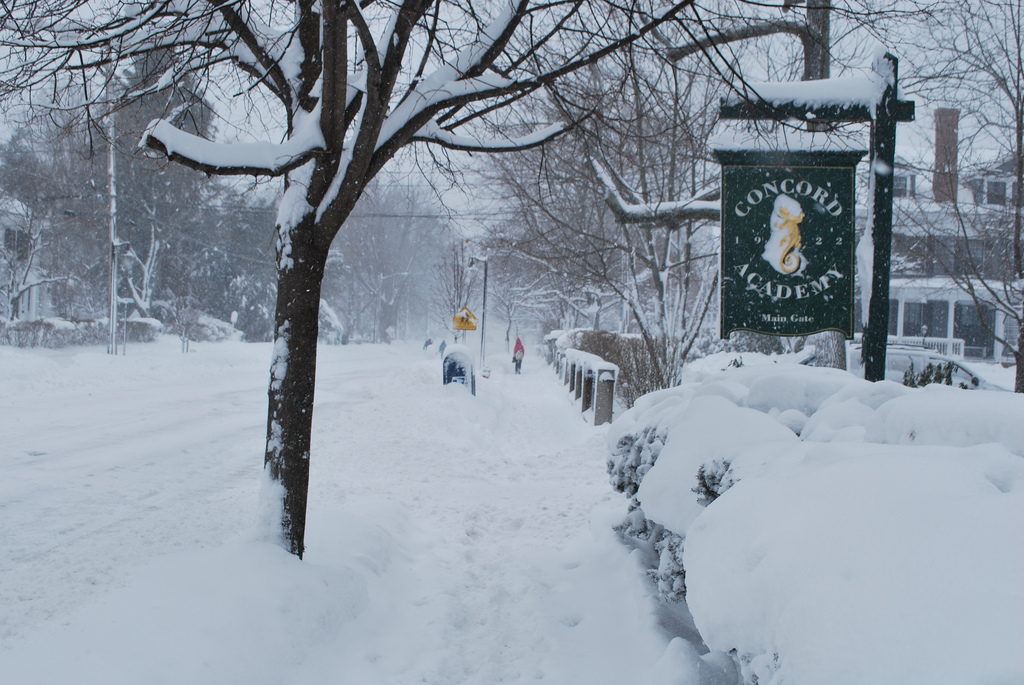
Main Gate in the snow

In recent years, organized fundraising efforts have generated an endowment whose income allows CA to offer a more generous financial aid policy than in years past. CA's endowment rose from $1 million in 1981 to $91 million in 2022. As with most boarding schools, full-pay boarding applications fell sharply in the 1970s. Unlike most boarding schools, however, day students once again comprised a majority of CA's enrollment by 1978, and remain a majority of the student body today.

Other notable dates in the school's history include the dedication and expansion of the Elizabeth B. Hall Chapel in 1984 and 2004–05, the dedication of the J. Josephine Tucker Library in 1987, the opening of expanded athletic facilities in 2012, and the reopening of the renovated science center in 2016.

The nation's first Gay-Straight Alliance chapter was established at Concord Academy by history teacher Kevin Jennings in the 1980s.

In 2018, Concord Academy banned former headmaster Russell Mead (1971–76) from the campus following reports of inappropriate conduct with a female student in the 1960s, when Mead was an English teacher.

The current head of school is Henry Fairfax, who began leading Concord Academy in July 2022. Under Fairfax, the school opened their new Centennial art center. Along with that, Concord Academy's prestige has risen. While their Acceptance rate is private it is believed to be ≈10% (according to their own admissions staff). This makes it similar to St. Paul's School, Choate Rosemary Hall, The Middlesex School, and other prestigious private high schools.

== Academics ==
Concord Academy follows a semester program, where most courses are term-based or year-long. The school's curriculum comprises more than 230 courses in eight academic disciplines, and a co-curricular athletics program. To foster a noncompetitive environment, the school does not compute class rank and awards no academic, arts, athletic, or community awards during the school year or at graduation.

The school's average combined SAT score is 1505 and the average combined ACT score is 34. Average SAT scores have increased by around 150 points in the last decade.

In 2005, the school eliminated Advanced Placement courses due to their purported lack of curricular depth. They were replaced by advanced courses designed by CA faculty, although the school still offers AP exams for those who wish to take them.

== Finances ==
=== Tuition and financial aid ===
Tuition and fees for the 2025–2026 academic year are $81,560 for boarding students and $65,320 for day students.

The school commits to award financial aid that meets 100% of admitted students' financial need. 27% of the student body is on financial aid, which covers, on average, $65,503 for boarding students (88% of tuition) and $28,442 (48% of tuition) for day students. (Concord and its surroundings are some of the wealthiest towns in Massachusetts.)

37% of CA's financial aid awards went to families with incomes under $100,000, and 72% went to families with incomes under $200,000.

=== Endowment and expenses ===
CA's financial endowment stood at just over $100 million in the 2023-2024 school year. In its Internal Revenue Service filings for the 2022-23 school year, CA reported total assets of $177 million, net assets of $152.6 million, investment holdings of $98.4 million, and cash holdings of $22.4 million. CA also reported $27.1 million in program service expenses and $5.3 million in grants (primarily student financial aid).

The school recently conducted its Centennial Campaign, which raised over $50 million to fund its endowment and construct a new arts center.

== Demographics ==
The demographic breakdown of the 395 students registered for the 2013–14 school year was:

- Asian – 23.3%
- Black – 2.6%
- Hispanic – 5.0%
- White – 61.7%
- Multiracial – 7.4%

In the 2023–24 school year, 35% of CA students arrived from public or charter schools and the remaining 65% attended private, religious, or international schools (international students comprise 11% of the student body).

== Athletics ==
Concord Academy students play on 28 teams in 23 sports; about 75 percent of students play on at least one team each year. Teams compete in the Eastern Independent League (EIL).

== Student life ==
Boarding students live in three girls' houses and three boys' houses, each holding an average of 25 students. Day (commuting) students comprise 60% of the student body and boarding students 40%; around one-third of the day students commute to school on MBTA Commuter Rail.

Students participate in a variety of clubs, performing arts groups, and other activities. The campus is a short walk from restaurants and shops in Concord, and students have easy access to Cambridge and Boston via commuter rail.

== Campus ==
Concord Academy's primary campus sits on 39 acres (16 ha) between Main Street and the Sudbury River in the center of Concord, Massachusetts. The campus includes eleven historic houses on Main Street, all built as family homes between 1780 and 1830. It is a three-minute walk from the center of Concord and a five-minute walk from the MBTA Commuter Rail stop in Concord.

Among the campus buildings are the PAC (Performing Arts Center), the SHAC (Student Health and Athletic Center), the main school, CA Labs, the MAC (Math and Arts Center), and the newly built CAC (Centennial Arts Center). The Elizabeth B. Hall Chapel is a 19th-century meetinghouse that was transported to Concord from Barnstead, New Hampshire in 1956. It serves as a meeting place three times per week for the entire Concord Academy community.

The 13-acre Moriarty Athletic campus, completed in 2012, is a mile from the main campus. It includes six tennis courts, a baseball field, a field hockey field, and two soccer/lacrosse fields. A field house contains changing rooms, a training room, and a common room with fireplace. These new facilities freed up space on the main campus for expansion of academic and arts facilities.

== Notable alumni ==
- Tyler C. Andrews – Professional long distance runner and mountaineer.
- Alexandra Berzon – Pulitzer Prize winning journalist.
- John K. Byrne – Founder of news website Raw Story.
- Sam Davol – Founding member and cellist for the band Magnetic Fields
- Ed Droste – Founding member of the band Grizzly Bear
- Drew Gilpin Faust – 28th president of Harvard University
- Peter R. Fisher – U.S. Under Secretary of the Treasury for Domestic Finance, 2001–2004
- Caitlin FitzGerald – American actress and filmmaker
- Huntley Fitzpatrick – Author of My Life Next Door, What I Thought Was True, and The Boy Most Likely To.
- Julia Glass – 2002 National Book Award-winning author of Three Junes and The Whole World Over.
- Charlie Grandy – Television writer, producer, winner of two Emmy Awards and two Writers' Guild Awards for Saturday Night Live; nominated for his work on The Daily Show with Jon Stewart and The Office.
- Larry Goldings – Jazz pianist, organist, composer, and Grammy nominee
- Claudia Gonson – Founding member of the band Magnetic Fields
- Stephen Heymann – Former assistant U.S. attorney for the District of Massachusetts.
- Sebastian Junger – Author of The Perfect Storm: A True Story of Men Against the Sea; director of the documentaries Restrepo and Korengal.
- Caroline Kennedy – Ambassador to Japan and Australia, author, attorney, daughter of U.S. President John F. Kennedy and Jacqueline Kennedy Onassis
- Sarah Koenig – Journalist, radio personality, producer of This American Life and host of the acclaimed podcast Serial
- Le1f – Rapper and producer, known for work with Das Racist.
- Anita Lo – Award-winning chef.
- Susan Minot – Author of Monkeys, Evening, and Folly
- Rachel Morrison – cinematographer
- Queen Noor of Jordan – Widow of King Hussein of Jordan
- Ruth Ozeki – 2022 Women's Prize winning author of The Book of Form and Emptiness.
- Imani Perry – Hughes-Rogers Professor of African American Studies at Princeton University. Winner of 2022 National Book Award, Nonfiction
- Julia Preston – Pulitzer Prize winner
- Hilary B. Price – Cartoonist.
- Richard Read – Two-time Pulitzer Prize winning journalist, Los Angeles Times national reporter.
- Cynthia Schneider – Ambassador to the Netherlands, Distinguished Professor in the Practice of Diplomacy in the School of Foreign Service at Georgetown University
- Theo Stockman – Broadway & television actor
- Matt Taibbi – Blogger and former columnist for Rolling Stone
- Philippe von Borries – co-founder and CEO of Refinery29, president of Lonely Planet
