= Landmark School =

School in Beverly, Massachusetts

Coordinates: 42°33′09.70″N 70°50′04.32″W

- Prides Crossing, Massachusetts; United States

Information
- Type: Private, boarding
- Established: 1971
- Founder: Charles Drake
- Head of school: Josh Clark
- Faculty: 325
- Grades: 2–12
- Gender: Coed
- Enrollment: 490 Total; 180 EMS; 310 High School (200 day, 110 boarding)
- Average class size: 4–8 students
- Student to teacher ratio: 1:3
- Campus size: 18 acres EMS; 27 acres High School
- Campus type: Town
- Colors: Blue and Yellow
- Athletics: Soccer, basketball, cross country, reselling, volleyball, golf, baseball, track and field, winter cross country, rowing. Along with other after school activities and clubs.
- Athletics conference: Eastern Independent League
- Mascot: Vikings
- Accreditation: New England Association of Schools & Colleges; Massachusetts Department of Education
- Publication: The Lantern
- Tuition: $78,500 Day $102,800 Residential
- Website: www.landmarkschool.org

Landmark School is a co-educational day and boarding school in Beverly, Massachusetts for students in grades 2–12 with language-based learning disabilities such as dyslexia.

== History ==
Landmark School was founded in 1971 by Dr. Charles Drake with the goal of educating students whose reading, writing, spelling, and mathematical skills did not align with their thinking and problem-solving abilities. In the beginning, there were only 40 students. Today, Landmark serves over 475 students in grades 2-12. The current Headmaster is Josh Clark. Josh follows Robert Broudo who retired after 50+ years at Landmark. Landmark offers a day program, a boarding program, and a summer program.

== The Landmark Approach ==
Landmark is designed for the difference with the ability to create a customized program for each student. All classes work on literacy and executive function skills. Classes are small with 6-8 students and each student has a tutorial specifically designed to work on skills just for them. The faculty is highly trained to work with students who have language-based learning disabilities.

== Athletics ==
Landmark's Athletics program uses a teacher-coach model in which classroom teachers coach students on the field. This approach allows educators to apply their knowledge of students' strengths and needs to the way they conduct lessons for students.

Landmark offers about 25 athletic teams across two campuses, as well as athletic clubs, including: cross-country, golf, soccer, volleyball, basketball, wrestling, baseball, lacrosse, sailing, tennis, ski club, mountain biking club, and more!
