= Madelyn Renée =

American opera singer and soprano (born 1955)

- Born: Madelyn Renée Levy; December 30, 1955 (age 70); Boston, Massachusetts, U.S.
- Genres: Opera
- Occupations: Opera singer, actress, vocal coach
- Instrument: Voice (soprano)
- Years active: 1980–present
- Partner: Luciano Pavarotti (1979–1986)
- Website: madelynrenee.com

Madelyn Renée Monti (née Levy; born December 30, 1955) is an American soprano and actress, known professionally as Madelyn Renée.

== Early life and education ==
Renée was born in Boston, Massachusetts. She enrolled at Cornell University before completing her vocal training at the Juilliard School in New York City, where she earned a bachelor's degree.

== Career ==
Renée made her professional debut with the San Diego Opera in 1980, performing the role of Mimi in La bohème, opposite Luciano Pavarotti. She later reprised the role in a separate production of La bohème at Symphony Hall in Boston, again performing with Pavarotti.

In 1983, a correspondent for The Times in Sydney named Renée as Pavarotti's protégée and long-time assistant, remarking on her appearance in three of his four encores at the Melbourne Concert Hall. Pavarotti attributed her rapid artistic development to their work together, noting that her vocal range and technique had advanced significantly under his guidance.

In July 1987, Renée performed at the Chester Music Festival in England.

Renée later performed again with Pavarotti at Madison Square Garden and the Hollywood Bowl. She also appeared alongside him during his 2002–2003 United States Concert Tour.

Renée has also performed at the Vienna Staatsoper, the Opéra-National de Paris, the Opéra-Comique in Paris, and La Scala in Milan. She has performed under the direction of conductors including Georg Solti, Richard Bonynge, James Levine, and Lorin Maazel.

=== Operatic roles ===
Renée's past roles include:

- La bohème (Mimi and Musetta)
- Falstaff (Alice Ford)
- Aida (Sacerdotessa/Priestess)
- Cavalleria Rusticana (Santuzza)
- Le Nozze di Figaro (Contessa)
- Don Giovanni (Zerlina and Donna Elvira)
- Così fan tutte (Despina)
- Nerone (Mascagni) (Atte)
- The Tales of Hoffmann (Giulietta)
- Carmen (Micaela)
- A Midsummer Night's Dream (Helena)
- The Merry Widow (Hanna Glawari and Valencienne)
- Faust (opéra) (Siebel)
- Street Scene (Rose Maurrant)
- Die Fledermaus (Rosalinde)
- L'elisir d'amore (Adina)

In the United States, she performed the role of Countess Almaviva in The Marriage of Figaro and the role of Donna Elvira in Don Giovanni.

== Film and television work ==
Renée appeared in Francis Ford Coppola's The Godfather Part III, singing and acting in opera sequences from Cavalleria rusticana.

Renée hosted Un Tocco di Classica, a weekly Italian television show focusing on classical music and opera.

She has also hosted satellite broadcasts that transmit live opera performances to European movie theatres.

== Teaching ==
Renée has worked as a vocal instructor, teaching at the Guildhall School of Music and the National Opera Studio in London.

== Personal life ==
Renée met Italian tenor Luciano Pavarotti while studying at Juilliard. She worked as his secretary and received lessons from him. She lived with Pavarotti at his New York residence for approximately eight years. From 1979 until 1986, the two were reported to have had a "personal connection."

After living outside Milan for some time, Renée returned to the city and performed under the name Madelyn Monti.

As of 2012, Renée resides in Milan.

== See also ==
- Luciano Pavarotti
