= Lexington Christian Academy (Massachusetts) =

School in Massachusetts, United States

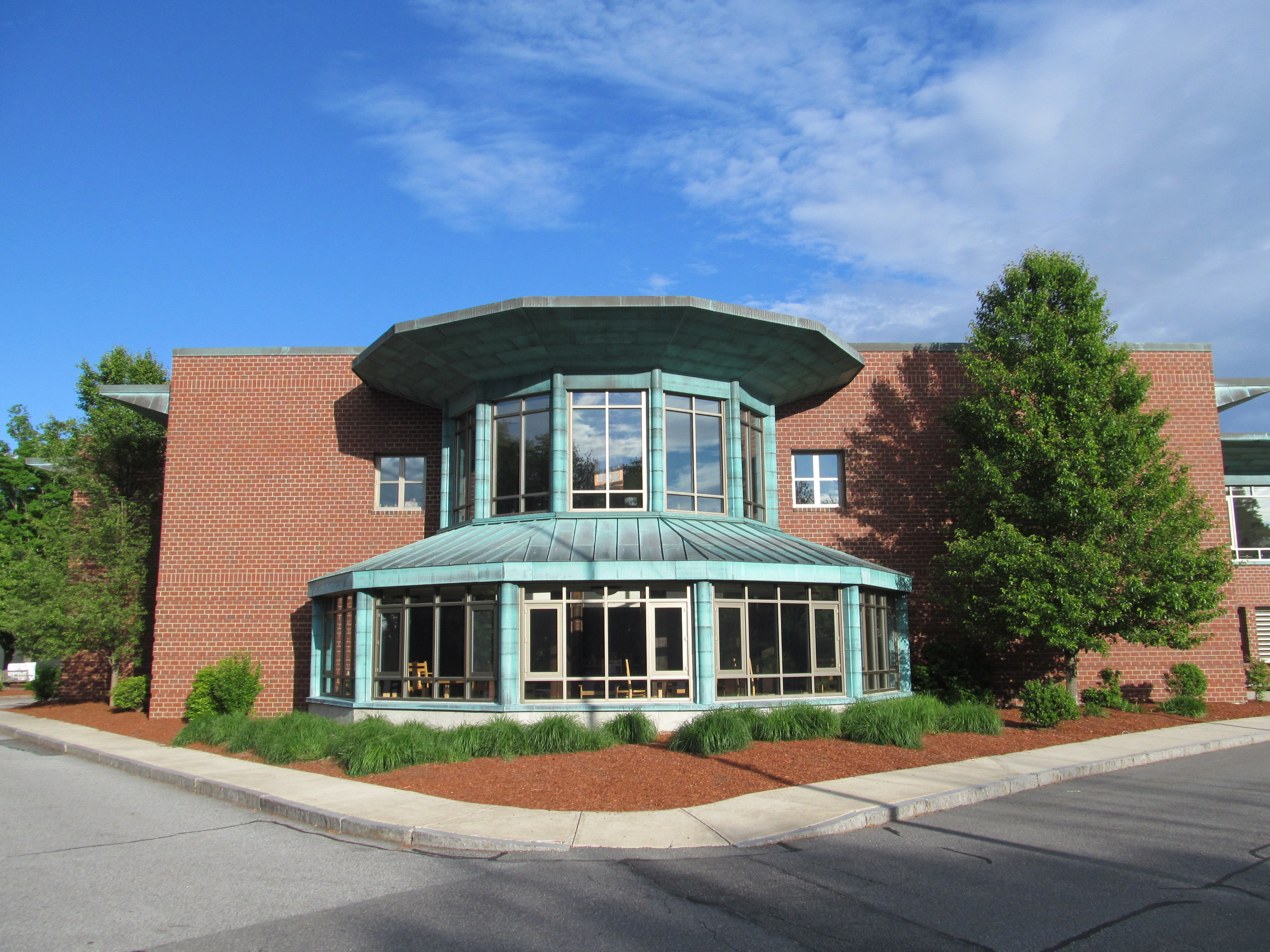
- Lexington Christian Academy
- Type: Private Day Boarding School
- Location: Lexington, Massachusetts, U.S.
- Website: www.lca.edu

Lexington Christian Academy is a private, day and boarding Christian school located in Lexington,Massachusetts.

Founded on June 23, 1946, Lexington Christian Academy is a college preparatory boarding school for 350 boys and girls in grades six through twelve. The current head of school, John Khouri, was appointed in 2024, after a 1-year interim term served by James Talkington.

The academy conducts college preparatory instruction on a semester schedule. Full-credit courses meet for four to six 60-minute blocks that rotate every six days. The academy's 30-acre campus features an outdoor pool and a sizable field for sports.

The school mascot is a lion named Leroy the Lion. Girls' sports teams are often referred to as the "Lady Lions."

== History ==
In 1942, Miss Elizabeth Evans, director of the Department of Education for the New England Fellowship [of Evangelicals], presented a plan to the board of directors for the formation of evangelical Christian elementary and secondary schools in New England. The New England Association of Christian Schools (NEACS), incorporated in 1946, was begun as a result of that meeting. Ms. Evans' hope was to have a network of elementary schools in the Boston suburbs that would serve as feeder schools for a central high school in Boston. North Shore Christian School in Lynn, a school in Rumney, New Hampshire and several schools on the South Shore were part of this network.

With the help of local evangelical leaders such as Harold John Ockenga and T. Leonard Lewis, President of Gordon College, Miss Evans proceeded with the plans to start a secondary school. Boston Christian High School opened in 1946 over a bowling alley on Huntington Avenue. The school quickly outgrew this space and Christian High School moved to Garden Street in Cambridge, Massachusetts to a school building formerly used by the Browne and Nichols School. Under the leadership of Miles Strodel, assistant headmaster, the board started to consider a move to Lexington, Massachusetts.

A key concern in making this move was access to the MBTA so that teens who lived in Boston would be able to attend the school. After the move, the name was changed to Lexington Christian Academy. The academy has been fully accredited since 1967 by the New England Association of Schools and Colleges.

In the 1990s, a thorough curriculum review was undertaken. At that time AP courses were added. In order to implement the curriculum, updated facilities were needed. LCA has added new classrooms and a library, a new gym and athletic fields. Five science labs have been added, the last two through a donation from the Van Lunen Foundation. As of June 2013, the Cross Worship and Performing Arts Center was completed and the dedication ceremony took place on May 13, 2013.
