= Crenshaw House (Gallatin County, Illinois) =

Historic house in Illinois, United States

- U.S. National Register of Historic Places
- Illinois State Historic Site
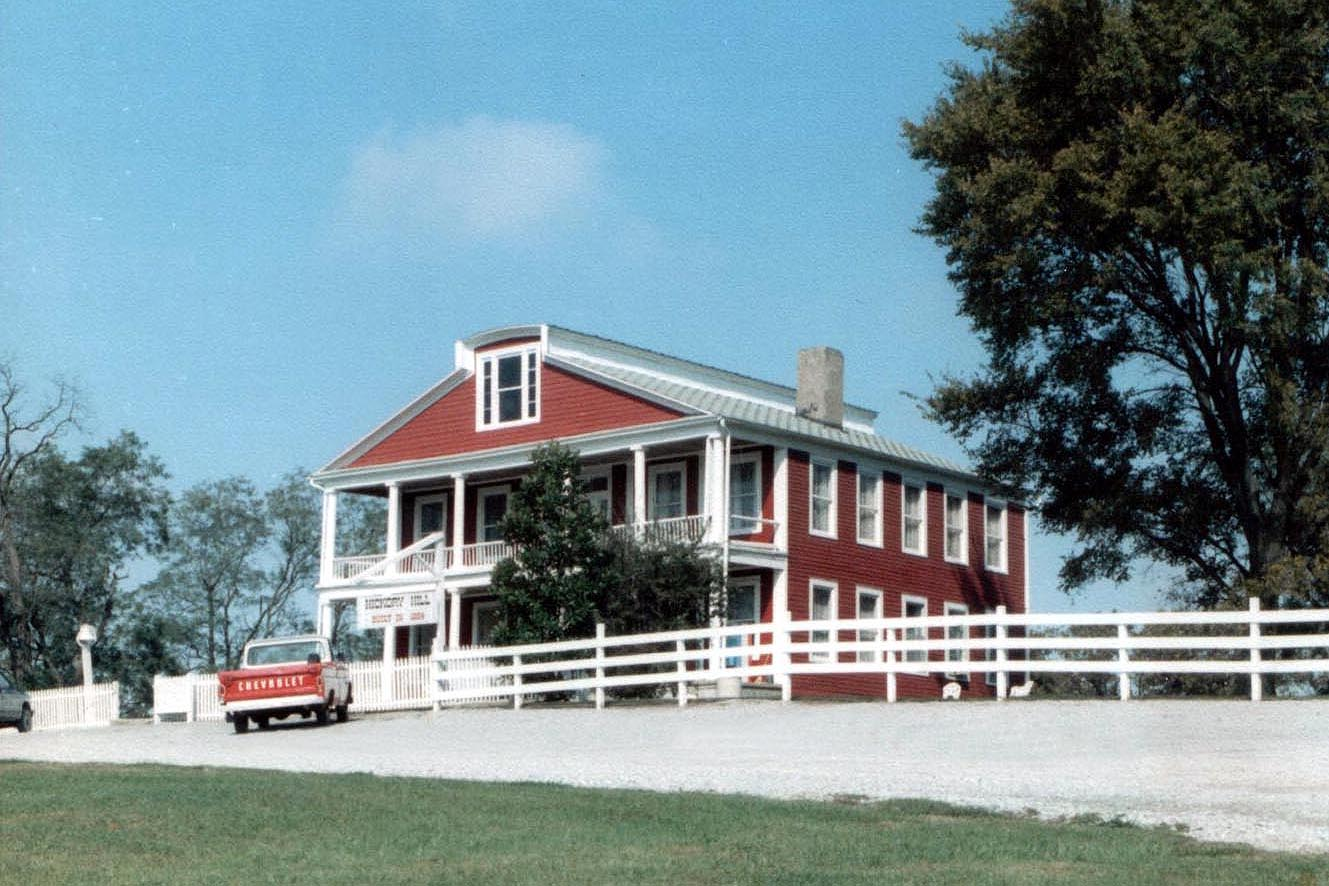
- Front and side of the house

- Location within Illinois Location within the United States
- Location: Off Rt. 1, Equality, Illinois
- Coordinates: 37°43′49″N 88°17′33″W
- Area: 2 acres (0.81 ha)
- Built: 1834
- Architect: William Gavin
- Architectural style: Greek Revival architecture, Vernacular Greek Revival
- NRHP reference No.: 85001164
- Added to NRHP: May 29, 1985

The Crenshaw House (also known as the Crenshaw Mansion, Hickory Hill or, most commonly, The Old Slave House) is a historic former residence located in Equality Township, Gallatin County, Illinois. The house was constructed in the 1830s. It was the main residence of John Crenshaw, his wife, and their five children.

In 2004, the National Park Service named the mansion as a "station" on the Reverse Underground Railroad to acknowledge Crenshaw's practice of kidnapping free blacks in Illinois and selling them in the Slave States.

== Early history ==
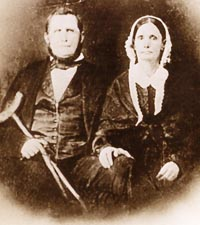
John Hart Crenshaw and his wife, Francine. Crenshaw carried a crutch because of his maimed leg.

Landowner and illegal slave trader John Hart Crenshaw leased the state-owned salt works located at the Illinois Salines, two saline springs along the Saline River near Equality that were important sources of salt since prehistory. Salt was vital to the early American frontier economy, both as a nutrient and as a means to preserve food. Illinois was a free state, and the Illinois State Constitution bans slavery. However, the law permitted the use of slaves at the salt works since the labor was so arduous that no free men could be found to do it. As the lessee of the salt works, Crenshaw was one of a small minority of Illinois residents legally entitled to keep slaves, and Crenshaw became remarkably wealthy. At one point, Crenshaw's taxes amounted to one-seventh of the revenue of the entire state. Crenshaw owned thousands of acres of land, in addition to the 30,000 acres (120 km^{2}) he leased from the state, and more than 700 slaves. In 1838, Crenshaw and his brother Abraham used this wealth to build the mansion on Hickory Hill, a few miles from the salt works near the town of Junction.

== Abraham Lincoln's visit ==
In September 1840, Abraham Lincoln, a state representative, was in Gallatin County for over a week attending debates in Shawneetown and Equality. The Crenshaws hosted a ball in honor of the debates. The ball was held on the second floor. The second floor of the house was designed to be easily converted into a ballroom because the hall and two of the rooms were made from moveable partitions particularly for such events. Lincoln along with other male guests spent the night in the Southeast bedroom of the Crenshaw House. The furniture in the room consisted of one bed and two chairs. Lincoln either slept on the bed, which was shorter than he was, or he could have spread out over the two chairs, or possibly slept on the floor.

In 1850, Crenshaw and his family moved to the nearby town of Equality, and hired a German family to live in the house and operate the farm. Crenshaw sold the house in 1864. Crenshaw died in 1871 and was buried in the Hickory Hill Cemetery. By 1913, the house was owned by the Sisk family.

== Kidnapping and the Reverse Underground Railroad ==
The Crenshaw House was a "station" on the Reverse Underground Railroad that transported escaped slaves and kidnapped free blacks back to servitude in slave states. The home's third floor attic contains 12 rooms long believed to be where Crenshaw operated a secret slave jail for kidnapped free black and captured runaway slaves. A grand jury indicted Crenshaw for kidnapping, once in the mid-1820s (the outcome unknown) and again in 1842 when a trial jury acquitted him. The case's victims, Maria Adams and her seven or eight children, ended up as slaves in Texas. In 1828, Crenshaw took Frank Granger and 15 others downriver to Tipton Co., Tennessee, and sold them as slaves. Crenshaw also kidnapped Lucinda and her children in 1828. She ended up in Barren Co., Kentucky. Contemporary letters identifying Crenshaw's role back both cases. Crenshaw also kidnapped Peter White and three others in the 1840s. They were sold into slavery in Arkansas, but later rescued. Stories of strange noises upstairs coming from victims, date to 1851. Despite accounts that the rooms were slave quarters, Crenshaw family stories indicate a distinction between the plantation's household servants and field hands, and the victims of Crenshaw's criminal activities.

In 2004, the National Park Service named the Crenshaw Mansion, referred to as "The Old Slave House", as part of the Underground Railroad National Network to Freedom program to acknowledge its importance in the reverse underground railroad and the role John Crenshaw played in condemning free blacks to slavery.

== Historic site ==
In 1913, the house was purchased by the Sisk family, who began charging for public tours offering "a thrilling experience".

In 1996 George Sisk, Jr. retired and closed the museum. In December 2000 the Sisk family sold the house to the state of Illinois. The state paid $500,000 for the house and 10 acres. It is currently closed to the public as the state determines its ultimate fate. Re-opening the house to the public would require renovations, repairs, a new road and parking lot, and a separate structure with a bathroom, all estimated to cost at least $7 million.

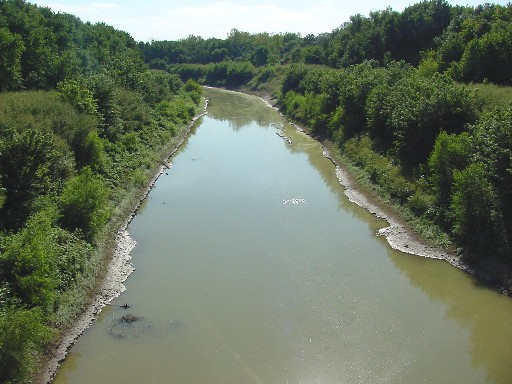
The Saline River of southeastern Illinois where John Crenshaw at the Illinois Salines leased out Kentucky slaves who boiled down salt brine water from the river into usable salt for sale.

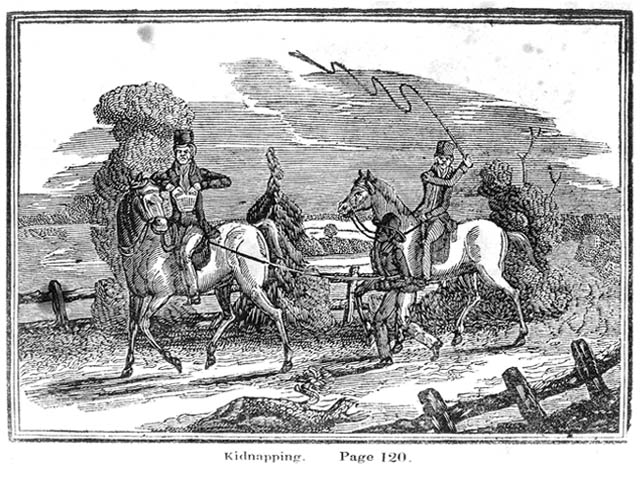
Kidnapping a free black from a free state to be sold into American slavery, 1834 in which Crenshaw was an active participant.
