= Bowlesville Township, Gallatin County, Illinois =

Bowlesville Township
- Township
- Location in Gallatin County

- Gallatin County's location in Illinois
- Coordinates: 37°38′42″N 88°12′49″W
- Country: United States
- State: Illinois
- County: Gallatin
- Established: November 5, 1890

Area
  - Total: 39.73 sq mi (102.9 km^{2})
  - Land: 38.53 sq mi (99.8 km^{2})
  - Water: 1.20 sq mi (3.1 km^{2}) 3.01%
- Elevation: 390 ft (119 m)

Population (2020)
  - Total: 132
  - Density: 3.43/sq mi (1.32/km^{2})
- Time zone: UTC-6 (CST)
  - Summer (DST): UTC-5 (CDT)
- ZIP codes: 62931, 62954, 62984
- FIPS code: 17-059-07536

Bowlesville Township is one of ten townships in Gallatin County, Illinois, USA. As of the 2020 census, its population was 132 and it contained 72 housing units.

== Geography ==
According to the 2021 census gazetteer files, Bowlesville Township has a total area of 39.73 square miles (102.90 km^{2}), of which 38.53 square miles (99.79 km^{2}) (or 96.99%) is land and 1.20 square miles (3.11 km^{2}) (or 3.01%) is water.

=== Unincorporated towns ===
- Gibsonia at 37.646993°N 88.262538°W

(This list is based on USGS data and may include former settlements.)

=== Extinct towns ===
- Bowlesville at 37.674214°N 88.212536°W

(These towns are listed as "historical" by the USGS.)

=== Cemeteries ===
The township contains these three cemeteries: Earnshaw, Hogan and Stanley.

=== Major highways ===
- Illinois Route 1

=== Airports and landing strips ===
- Dortch Private Strip

=== Rivers ===
- Ohio River
- Saline River

=== Lakes ===
- Mud Lake

== Demographics ==
As of the 2020 census there were 132 people, 37 households, and 0 families residing in the township. The population density was 3.32 inhabitants per square mile (1.28/km^{2}). There were 72 housing units at an average density of 1.81 per square mile (0.70/km^{2}). The racial makeup of the township was 91.67% White, 1.52% African American, 0.76% Native American, 2.27% Asian, 0.00% Pacific Islander, 0.00% from other races, and 3.79% from two or more races. Hispanic or Latino of any race were 0.76% of the population.

There were 37 households, all of which were non-families. 100.00% of all households were made up of individuals, and 51.40% had someone living alone who was 65 years of age or older.

The township's age distribution consisted of 0.0% under the age of 18, 0.0% from 18 to 24, 48.6% from 25 to 44, 0% from 45 to 64, and 51.4% who were 65 years of age or older. The median age was 76.1 years. For every 100 females, there were 94.7 males. For every 100 females age 18 and over, there were 94.7 males.

The per capita income for the township was $6,327.

Historical population
Census	Pop.	Note	%±
2000	190		—
2010	188		−1.1%
2020	132		−29.8%
U.S. Decennial Census

== School districts ==
- Gallatin Community Unit School District 7
- Hardin County Community Unit School District 1

== Political districts ==
- Illinois' 19th congressional district
- State House District 118
- State Senate District 59
