= Junction, Illinois =

- Village
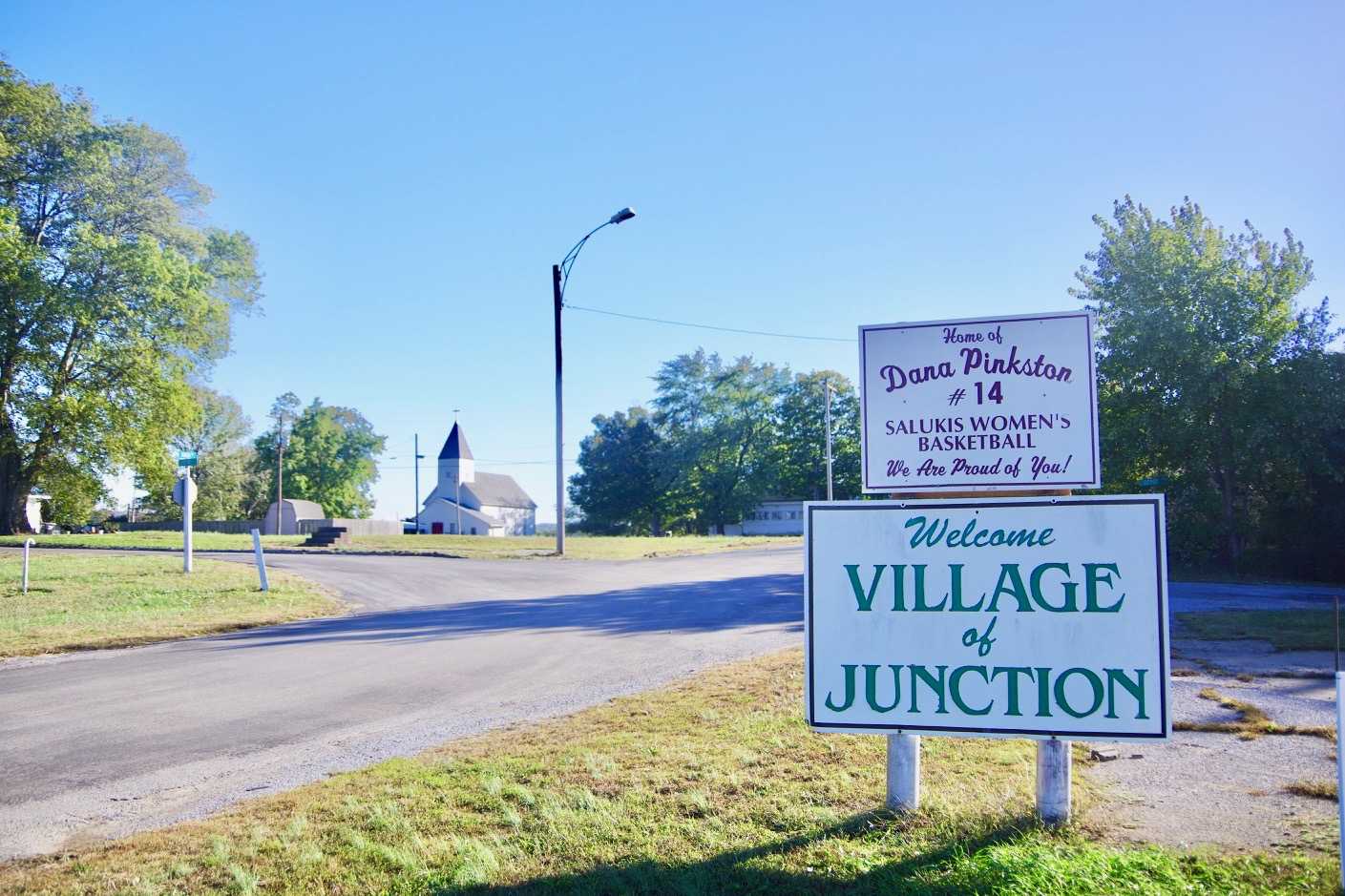
- Welcome sign

- Location of Junction in Gallatin County, Illinois.
- Coordinates: 37°43′24″N 88°14′17″W
- Country: United States
- State: Illinois
- County: Gallatin
- Township: Gold Hill

Area
  - Total: 0.83 sq mi (2.14 km^{2})
  - Land: 0.83 sq mi (2.14 km^{2})
  - Water: 0 sq mi (0.00 km^{2})
- Elevation: 358 ft (109 m)

Population (2010)
  - Total: 129
  - Density: 134.4/sq mi (51.88/km^{2})
- Time zone: UTC-6 (CST)
  - Summer (DST): UTC-5 (CDT)
- ZIP code: 62954
- Area code: 618
- FIPS code: 17-38778
- GNIS feature ID: 2398314

Junction is a village in Gold Hill Township, Gallatin County, Illinois, United States. The population was 56 at the 2020 census.

== History ==
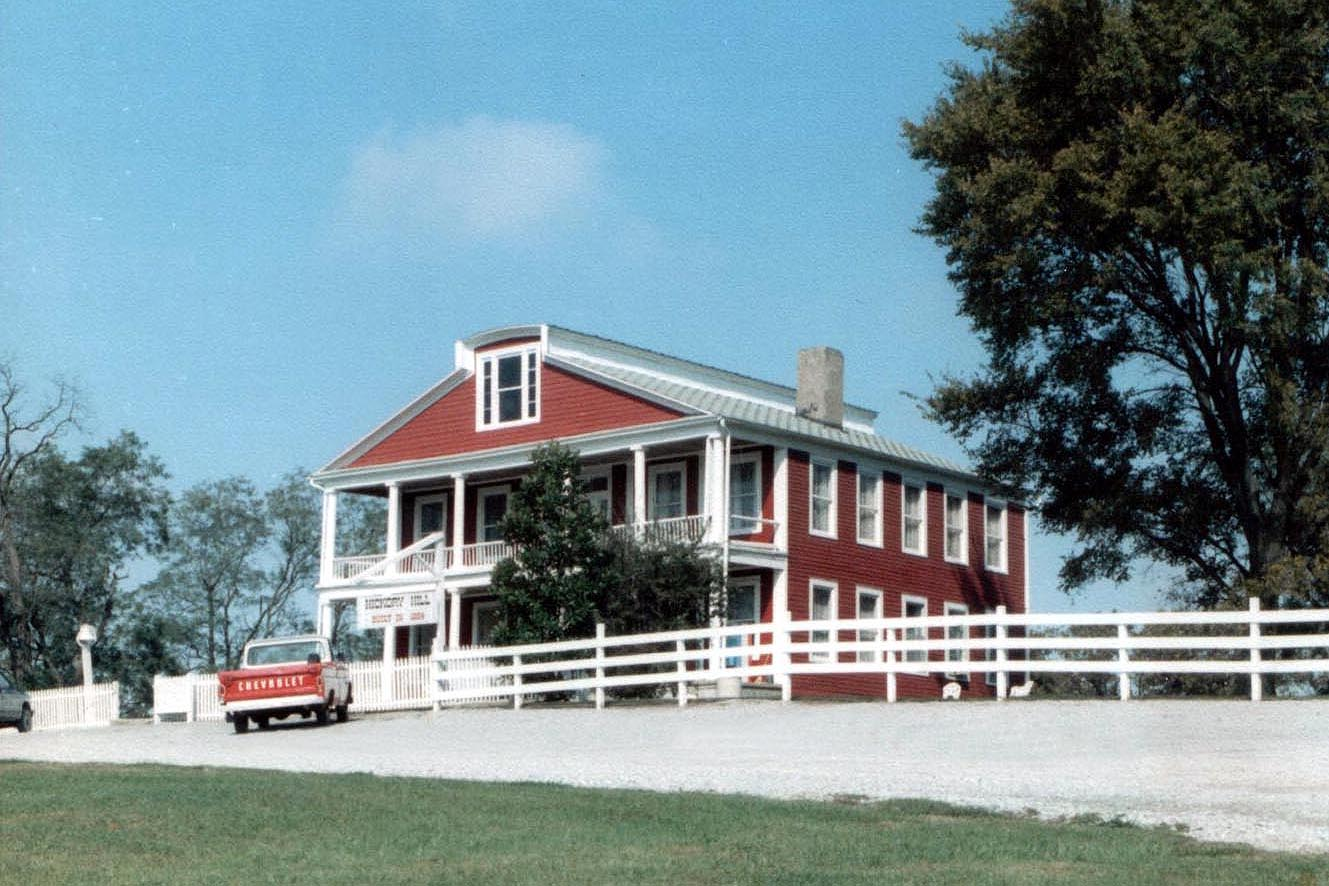
1970s photograph of the John Hart Crenshaw House near Junction

Junction was founded in the 1880s, and was named for its location at the junction of the L&N and B&O railroads. When a post office was established in 1884, it was named "Cypress Junction." The name was changed to "Junction City" in 1888, and shortened to "Junction" in 1894.

Junction's location in a relatively flat area leaves it prone to flooding along the Ohio River, which can cause waters in the nearby Saline River to back up. A major flood in March 1997 displaced several area residents and blocked all but one road leading into the village.

On June 1, 2022, Junction General Baptist Church burned down after lightning struck the steeple.

=== Crenshaw House ===
The Hickory Hill mansion, almost five miles west of Junction, is the 19th-century home of illegal slave trader and slave breeder John Hart Crenshaw. It was infamously known as the "Old Slave House," as it was used as a criminal front for the kidnapping of free blacks who were illegally sold into the Southern slave trade on the Reverse Underground Railroad, as well as a farm for slave breeding.

== Geography ==
Junction is located at the center of Gallatin County. The village lies along Illinois Route 13, a few miles west of the Ohio River, and north of the Shawnee National Forest. The Saline River, a tributary of the Ohio, passes just to the south.

According to the 2010 census, Junction has a total area of 0.883 square miles (2.29 km^{2}), of which 0.88 square miles (2.28 km^{2}) (or 99.66%) is land and 0.003 square miles (0.01 km^{2}) (or 0.34%) is water.

== Demographics ==
Historical population
Census	Pop.	Note	%±
1910	800		—
1920	321		−59.9%
1930	292		−9.0%
1940	320		9.6%
1950	239		−25.3%
1960	238		−0.4%
1970	199		−16.4%
1980	192		−3.5%
1990	201		4.7%
2000	139		−30.8%
2010	129		−7.2%
2020	56		−56.6%
U.S. Decennial Census

As of the 2020 census, there were 56 people, 35 households, and 38 families residing in the village. The racial makeup of the village was 92.9% White. Hispanic or Latino of any race were 1.79% of the population.

There were 35 households, out of which 10.2% had children under the age of 18 living with them, 68.6% were married couples living together, 22.9% had a female householder with no husband present.

The median income for a household in the village was $32,375, and the median income for a family was $42,500. 45.5% of those over 64 were living below the poverty line.

== Notable person ==
- John Hart Crenshaw, landowner, salt maker, illegal slave trader and kidnapper
