= Gallatin Community Unit School District 7 =

School district in Illinois, United States

Gallatin County Community Unit School District 7

Address
- 5175 Highway 13, Junction, Illinois 62954 Gallatin County, Illinois
- Coordinates: 37°44′24″N 88°16′38″W

District information
- Type: Unit district
- Grades: Pre-K–12
- Established: July 1, 1987
- Budget: $6,718,132 (expenditure as of 2014)
- NCES District ID: 1700045
- District ID: 20-030-0070-26

Students and staff
- Students: 781 (as of 2016)
- Teachers: 53 (full-time equivalent as of 2016)
- Student–teacher ratio: 18.4 (elementary as of 2016); 15.9 (high school as of 2016)

Other information
- Website: www.gallatincusd7.com

Gallatin Community Unit School District 7 is a school district covering most of Gallatin County, Illinois, United States. It operates a single campus, the Gallatin County Educational Complex, also known as Gallatin County School, which is divided into a grade school, junior high school, and high school, between Equality and Junction in Equality Township, Gallatin County, Illinois.

As of 2015 there were 213 high school students enrolled.

== History ==
=== Previous schools ===
The New Haven School was closed in 1973.

Shawneetown High School in new Shawneetown was closed in 1991; students then went to the newly built Gallatin High School.

=== CUSD 7 ===
The school district was established on July 1, 1987, by the consolidation of North Gallatin Community Unit School District 1, Southeast Gallatin Community Unit School District 2, and Equality Community Unit School District 4.

The educational complex opened in August 1991, taking in students that were at Equality, Ridgway, and Shawneetown.
