= John Crenshaw =

American slave trader (1797–1871)

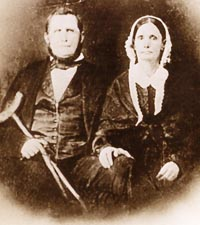
- Crenshaw with his wife
- Born: John Hart Crenshaw; November 19, 1797; North Carolina, U.S.
- Died: December 4, 1871 (aged 74); Hickory Hill estate, Equality, Illinois, U.S.
- Resting place: Hickory Hill Cemetery
- Occupation: Salt maker
- Known for: Illegal slave trader
- Spouse: Francine "Sina" Taylor
- Children: 6

John Hart Crenshaw (November 19, 1797 – December 4, 1871) was an American landowner, salt maker, kidnapper and slave trader, based out of Gallatin County, Illinois.

== Slave trader ==
Although Illinois was a free state, Crenshaw leased the salt works in nearby Equality, Illinois from the government, which permitted the use of slaves for the arduous labor of hauling and boiling brackish water to produce salt. Crenshaw was widely believed to be involved in the kidnapping and sale of free black citizens in free states as slaves in the south, an enormously profitable trade later known as the Reverse Underground Railroad. Crenshaw was twice prosecuted for kidnapping, but never convicted.

Due to Crenshaw's keeping slaves and kidnapping free blacks, who were then pressed into slavery, his house became popularly known as The Old Slave House and is alleged to be haunted. Stories of strange noises upstairs, coming from victims, date to 1851. Despite accounts that the rooms were slave quarters, Crenshaw family stories indicate a distinction between the plantation's household servants and field hands, and the victims of Crenshaw's criminal activities.

A grand jury indicted Crenshaw for kidnapping, once in the mid-1820s (the outcome unknown) and again in 1842 when a trial jury acquitted him. The case's victims, Maria Adams and her seven or eight children, ended up as slaves in Texas. In 1828, Crenshaw took Frank Granger and 15 others downriver to Tipton County, Tennessee, and sold them as slaves. Crenshaw also kidnapped 'Lucinda' and her children in 1828. She ended up in Barren County, Kentucky. Contemporary letters identify Crenshaw's role back both cases. Crenshaw also kidnapped Peter White and three others in the 1840s. They were sold into slavery in Arkansas, but were later rescued.

== Underground Railroad National Network to Freedom ==
In 2004, the National Park Service named the Crenshaw Mansion, referred to as "The Old Slave House", as part of the Underground Railroad Network to Freedom program to acknowledge its importance in the "reverse underground railroad" and the role John Crenshaw played in condemning free blacks to slavery for profit.

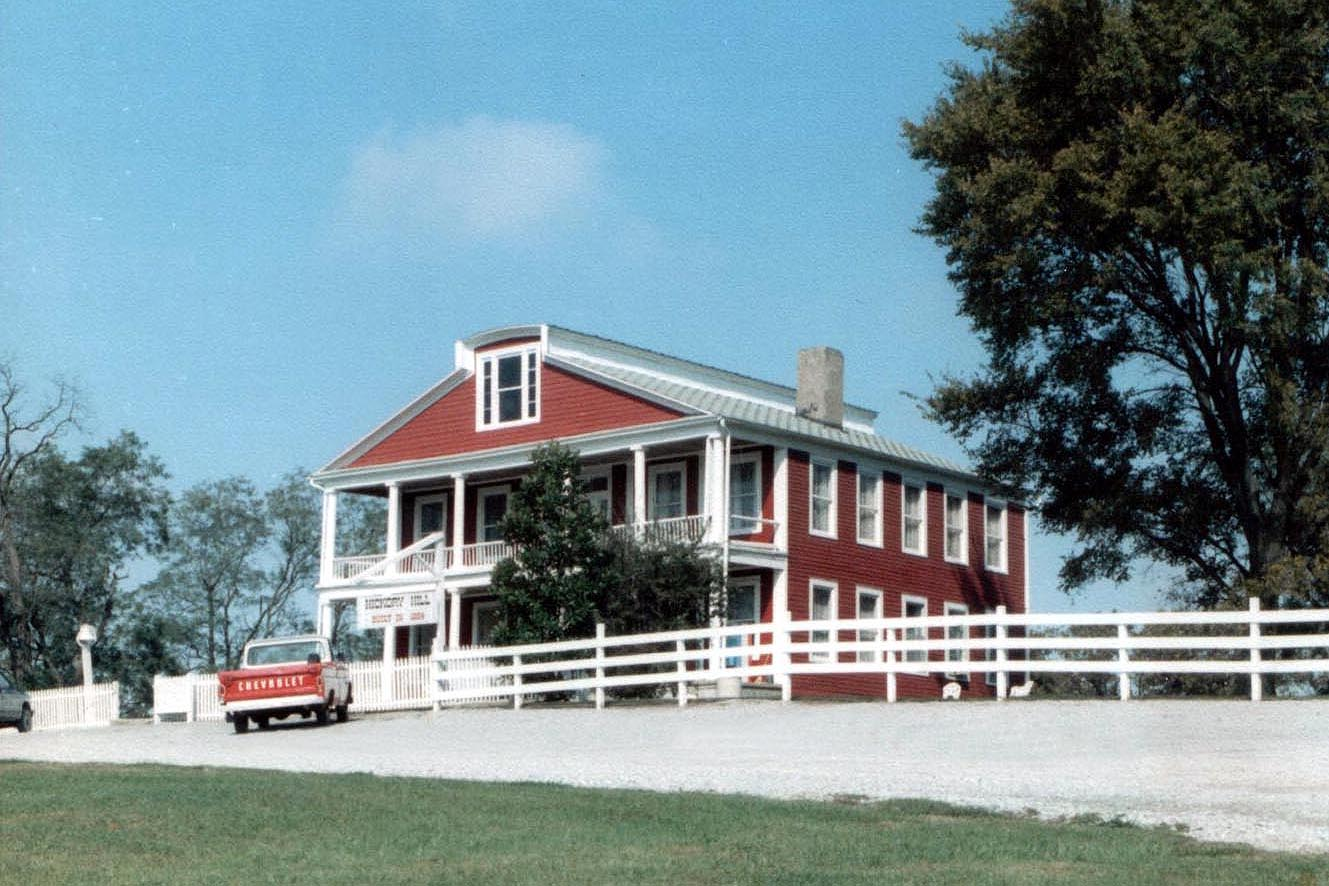
1970s photograph of the "Old Slave House" built by John Hart Crenshaw.

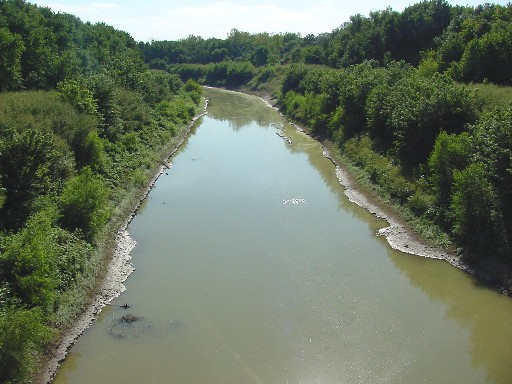
The Saline River of southeastern Illinois where John Crenshaw at the Illinois Salines, in Equality, Illinois, leased out Kentucky slaves from their owners who boiled down salt brine water from wells and the river into usable salt for sale.

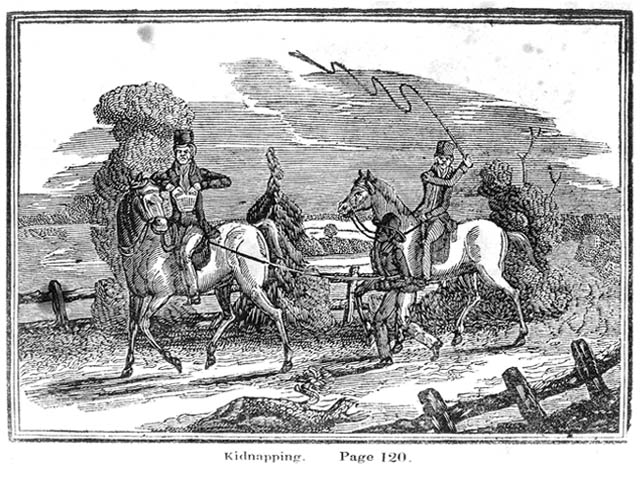
Kidnapping a free black in a non-slave state to be sold into American slavery, 1834 in which Crenshaw was an active participant.

James Ford, the ferry operator and outlaw across the Ohio River in western Kentucky, knew John Hart Crenshaw and probably used his criminal gang to illegally transport kidnapped free blacks from Illinois to The South to be sold into slavery.

== See also ==
- Patty Cannon
- James Ford (pirate)
- Delphine LaLaurie
- Underground Railroad
