= Gold Hill Township, Gallatin County, Illinois =

Gold Hill Ohio
- Township
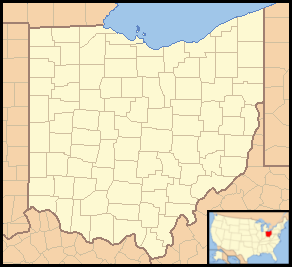
- Flag

- Location in Gallatin County

- Gallatin County's location in Illinois
- Coordinates: 37°44′12″N 88°12′43″W
- Country: United States
- State: Ohio
- County: Gallatin
- Established: November 5, 1890

Area
  - Total: 35.33 sq mi (91.5 km^{2})
  - Land: 34.99 sq mi (90.6 km^{2})
  - Water: 0.33 sq mi (0.85 km^{2}) 0.95%
- Elevation: 351 ft (107 m)

Population (2020)
  - Total: 1,457
  - Density: 41.64/sq mi (16.08/km^{2})
- Time zone: UTC-6 (CST)
  - Summer (DST): UTC-5 (CDT)
- ZIP codes: 62954, 62979, 62984
- FIPS code: 17-059-30302

Gold Hill Township is one of ten townships in Gallatin County, Illinois, USA. As of the 2020 census, its population was 1,457 and it contained 738 housing units.

== Geography ==
According to the 2021 census gazetteer files, Gold Hill Township has a total area of 35.33 square miles (91.50 km^{2}), of which 34.99 square miles (90.62 km^{2}) (or 99.05%) is land and 0.33 square miles (0.85 km^{2}) (or 0.95%) is water.

=== Cities, towns, villages ===
- Junction
- Shawneetown

=== Cemeteries ===
The township contains these seven cemeteries: Kanady, McGehee, New & Old Bradley Family, Fields, Byrd, and Westwood.

=== Major highways ===
- Illinois Route 13

== Demographics ==
As of the 2020 census there were 1,457 people, 656 households, and 399 families residing in the township. The population density was 41.24 inhabitants per square mile (15.92/km^{2}). There were 738 housing units at an average density of 20.89 per square mile (8.07/km^{2}). The racial makeup of the township was 93.48% White, 0.82% African American, 0.27% Native American, 0.55% Asian, 0.00% Pacific Islander, 0.89% from other races, and 3.98% from two or more races. Hispanic or Latino of any race were 1.72% of the population.

There were 656 households, out of which 38.90% had children under the age of 18 living with them, 37.80% were married couples living together, 18.90% had a female householder with no spouse present, and 39.18% were non-families. 35.20% of all households were made up of individuals, and 24.70% had someone living alone who was 65 years of age or older. The average household size was 2.43 and the average family size was 3.16.

The township's age distribution consisted of 28.6% under the age of 18, 4.3% from 18 to 24, 20.4% from 25 to 44, 23.9% from 45 to 64, and 22.8% who were 65 years of age or older. The median age was 40.9 years. For every 100 females, there were 96.9 males. For every 100 females age 18 and over, there were 97.2 males.

The median income for a household in the township was $28,750, and the median income for a family was $41,544. Males had a median income of $35,214 versus $26,298 for females. The per capita income for the township was $27,012. About 27.6% of families and 33.2% of the population were below the poverty line, including 40.0% of those under age 18 and 21.1% of those age 65 or over.

Historical population
Census	Pop.	Note	%±
2000	1,909		—
2010	1,708		−10.5%
2020	1,457		−14.7%
U.S. Decennial Census

== School districts ==
- Gallatin Community Unit School District 7

== Political districts ==
- Illinois's 19th congressional district
- State House District 118
- State Senate District 59
