= Gallatin County Courthouse (Illinois) =

Local government building in the United States

Coordinates: 37°43′1″N 88°11′11″W

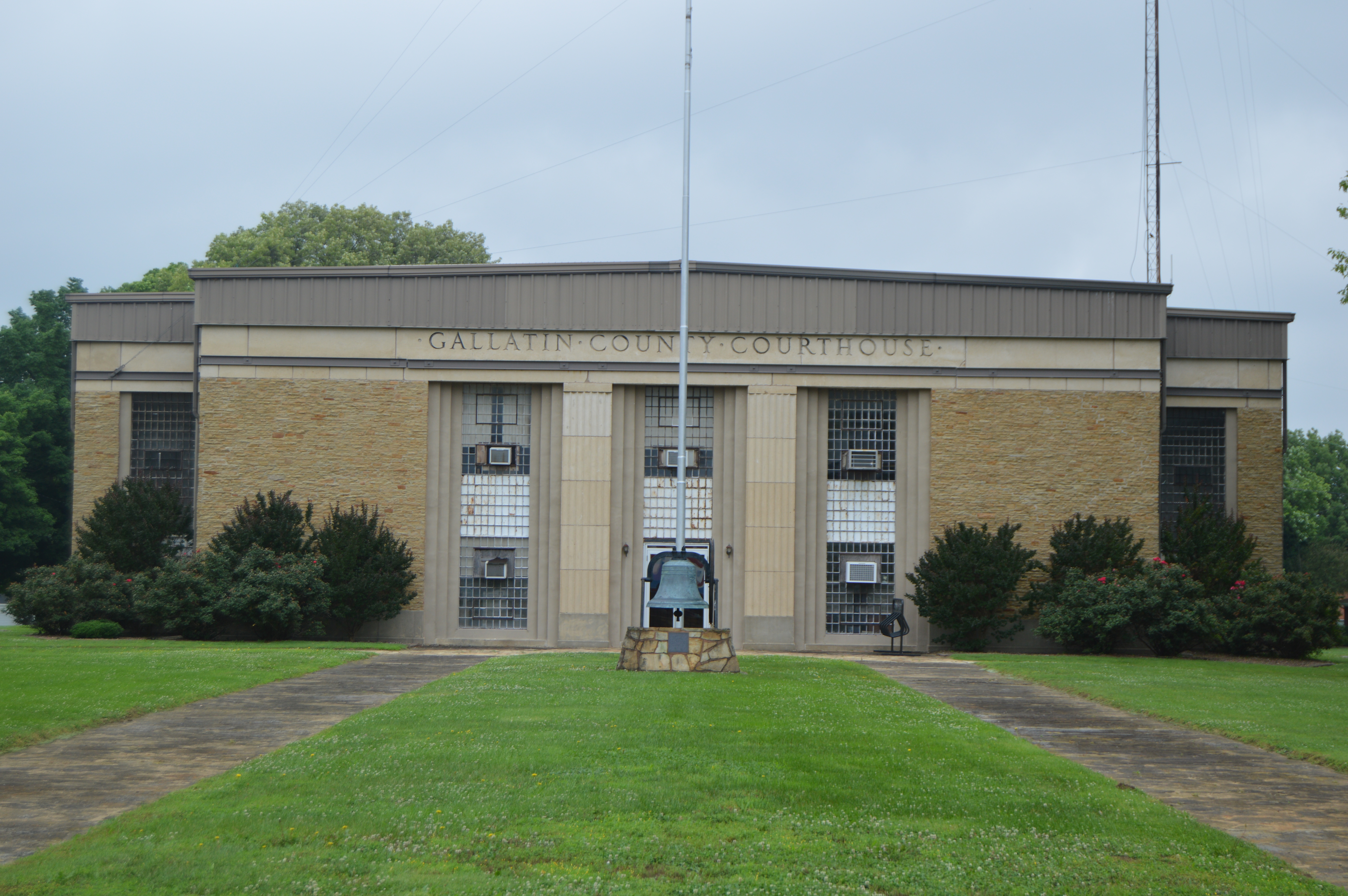
Front of the courthouse

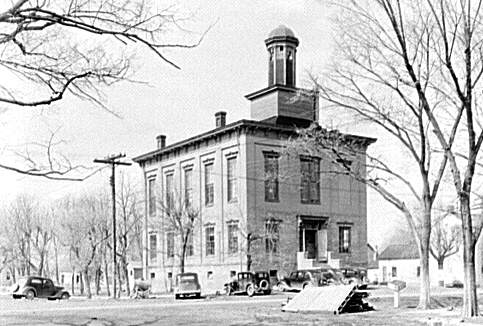
Previous courthouse at the old site of Shawneetown

The Gallatin County Courthouse is a government building in Shawneetown, the county seat of Gallatin County, Illinois, United States. Built in 1939, it is at least the third Shawneetown building to serve as the county courthouse, but the only one following Shawneetown's complete relocation to avoid flooding on the Ohio River.

Gallatin County's first settler, Michael Sprinkle, established himself circa 1800 at the later site of Shawneetown. Other houses were first built at the site in 1804, and the town quickly prospered because of its proximity to the Great Salt Spring; even a federal land office opened in the city in 1814. By this time, Gallatin County was two years old, having been established by territorial governor Ninian Edwards in a September 1812 proclamation; Shawneetown was named the county seat from the beginning. The county court first met in May 1813, using a residence as a courthouse. Land was donated for courthouse construction in late 1815, but a state law ordered the county seat's removal to Equality in 1827. Shawneetown again sought the county seat title twenty years later, and a contentious election ensued; the Legislature intervened in 1851, enacting a law providing for the union of Gallatin County with Saline County and for the permanent removal of the seat to Equality, but a constitutionally mandated referendum prevented the law from taking effect. A permanent courthouse was erected in Shawneetown in 1857, two stories tall with a tower topping the facade.

From its earliest years, Shawneetown suffered from Ohio River floods, among the worst being those of 1832, 1847, 1853, and 1858, but the devastation of the flood of 1859 convinced local residents of the necessity of some means of flood control. The following years saw several levees constructed, each of which was destroyed by a flood and replaced with a larger and firmer structure. However, nothing could compare with the Great Flood of 1937: the city was so profoundly affected by that year's floods, which struck in January, that by February the city fathers were determined to relocate the entire city out of the floodplain. State aid was given to purchase land in the center of the county, and the two-year process of building a new planned community began by July. The courthouse at "Old" Shawneetown was destroyed, and assistance from the WPA enabled the 1939 completion of the new courthouse in the center of "New" Shawneetown.

The 1939 Art Deco courthouse remains in use by the Gallatin County government. Built of brick, it features a seven-part facade: three recessed sections of glass block, with an entrance in the center section, are separated by wide pilasters, while a brick section forms the ends of each side of the facade. The roof rises to a gable with an extremely shallow slope, being nearly flat.
