= Equality Township, Gallatin County, Illinois =

Equality Township
- Township
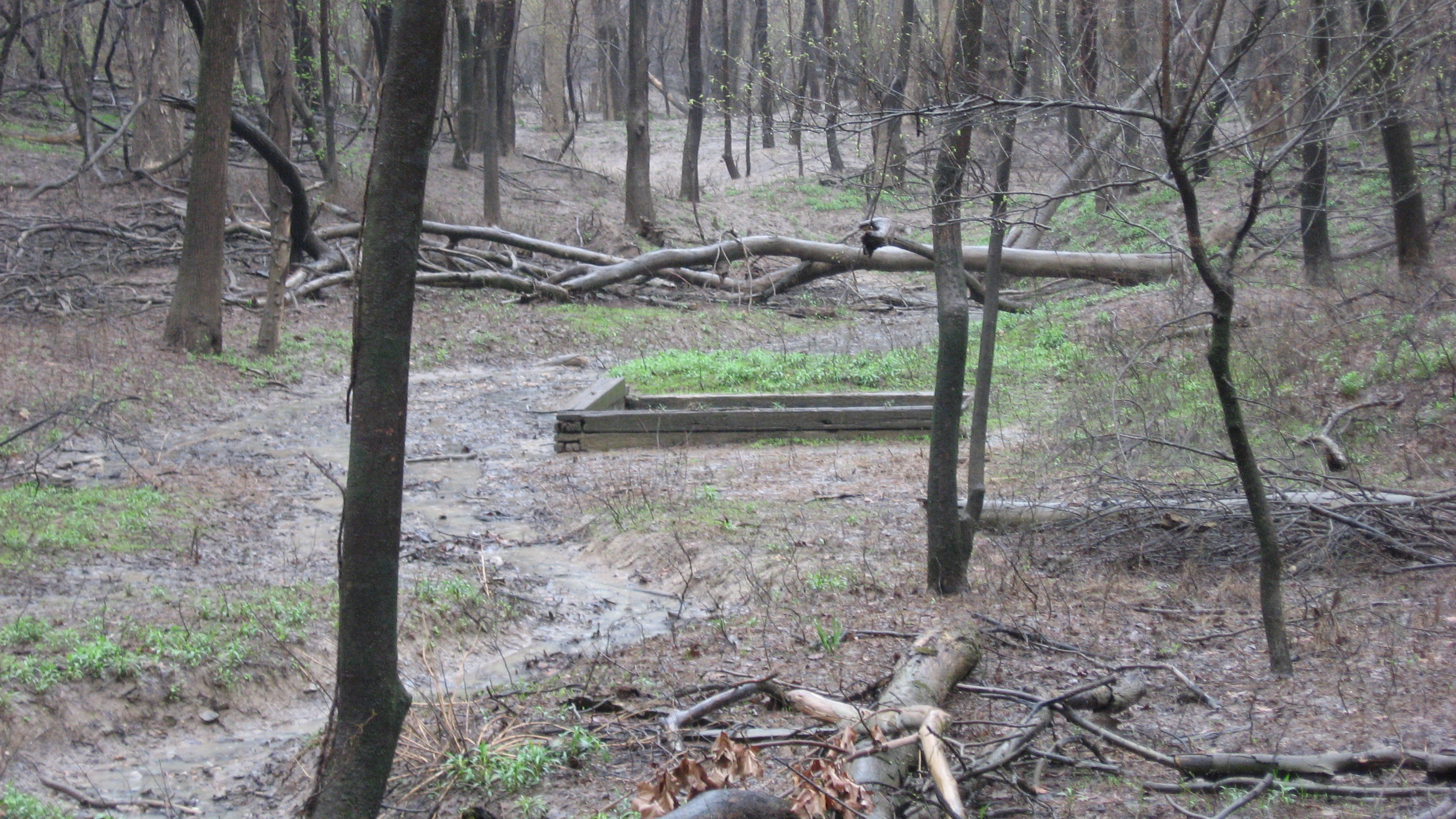
- One of the Illinois Salines

- Location in Gallatin County

- Gallatin County's location in Illinois
- Coordinates: 37°44′02″N 88°18′49″W
- Country: United States
- State: Illinois
- County: Gallatin
- Established: November 5, 1890

Area
  - Total: 37.21 sq mi (96.4 km^{2})
  - Land: 36.84 sq mi (95.4 km^{2})
  - Water: 0.37 sq mi (0.96 km^{2}) 1.00%
- Elevation: 354 ft (108 m)

Population (2020)
  - Total: 765
  - Density: 20.8/sq mi (8.02/km^{2})
- Time zone: UTC-6 (CST)
  - Summer (DST): UTC-5 (CDT)
- ZIP codes: 62934, 62954, 62979, 62984
- FIPS code: 17-059-24361

Equality Township is one of ten townships in Gallatin County, Illinois, United States. As of the 2020 census, its population was 765 and it contained 389 housing units.

== Geography ==
According to the 2021 census gazetteer files, Equality Township has a total area of 37.21 square miles (96.37 km^{2}), of which 36.84 square miles (95.42 km^{2}) (or 99.00%) is land and 0.37 square miles (0.96 km^{2}) (or 1.00%) is water.

=== Cities, towns, villages ===
- Equality

=== Unincorporated towns ===
- Lawler at 37.728103°N 88.285873°W

(This list is based on USGS data and may include former settlements.)

=== Cemeteries ===
The township contains these four cemeteries: Elmwood, Equality Village, Hickory Hill Catholic and Level Hill.

=== Major highways ===
- Illinois Route 1
- Illinois Route 13
- Illinois Route 142

=== Rivers ===
- Saline River

== Demographics ==
As of the 2020 census there were 765 people, 405 households, and 294 families residing in the township. The population density was 20.56 inhabitants per square mile (7.94/km^{2}). There were 389 housing units at an average density of 10.46 per square mile (4.04/km^{2}). The racial makeup of the township was 96.73% White, 0.00% African American, 0.00% Native American, 0.13% Asian, 0.00% Pacific Islander, 0.13% from other races, and 3.01% from two or more races. Hispanic or Latino of any race were 1.44% of the population.

There were 405 households, out of which 24.00% had children under the age of 18 living with them, 58.27% were married couples living together, 11.11% had a female householder with no spouse present, and 27.41% were non-families. 27.40% of all households were made up of individuals, and 14.80% had someone living alone who was 65 years of age or older. The average household size was 2.08 and the average family size was 2.44.

The township's age distribution consisted of 13.7% under the age of 18, 1.8% from 18 to 24, 18.7% from 25 to 44, 37.7% from 45 to 64, and 28.2% who were 65 years of age or older. The median age was 58.3 years. For every 100 females, there were 105.4 males. For every 100 females age 18 and over, there were 108.6 males.

The median income for a household in the township was $52,939, and the median income for a family was $54,565. Males had a median income of $50,563 versus $32,031 for females. The per capita income for the township was $45,967. About 8.2% of families and 12.8% of the population were below the poverty line, including 27.6% of those under age 18 and 4.6% of those age 65 or over.

Historical population
Census	Pop.	Note	%±
2000	1,024		—
2010	849		−17.1%
2020	765		−9.9%
2016 (est.)	789		−7.1%
U.S. Decennial Census

== School districts ==
- Gallatin Community Unit School District 7

== Political districts ==
- Illinois' 19th congressional district
- State House District 118
- State Senate District 59
