= Lawler, Illinois =

- Unincorporated community
- Location within Illinois Location within the United States
- Coordinates: 37°43′41″N 88°17′09″W
- Country: United States
- State: Illinois
- County: Gallatin
- Township: Equality
- Elevation: 367 ft (112 m)
- Time zone: UTC-6 (Central (CST))
  - Summer (DST): UTC-5 (CDT)
- Area code: 618
- GNIS feature ID: 422900

Lawler is an unincorporated community in Equality Township, Gallatin County, Illinois, United States.

The community has the name of Michael Kelly Lawler, a General in the American Civil War.
