= Kidnapping into slavery in the United States =

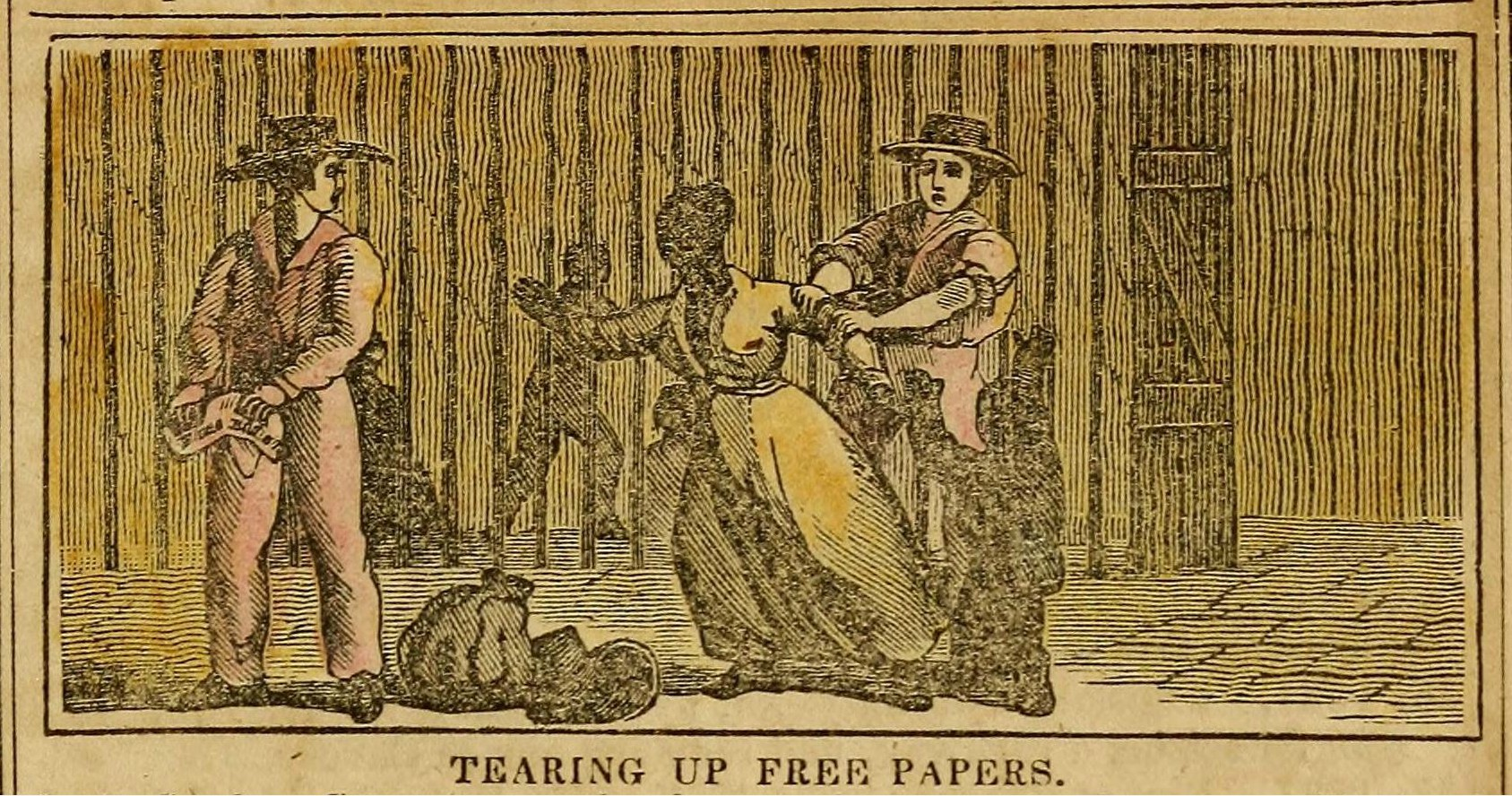
- Tearing up the free-born and manumission papers and kidnapping of a free black, in the U.S. free states, to be sold into Southern slavery, from an 1838 abolitionist anti-slavery almanac
- Date: 1780–1865
- Location: Northern United States and Southern United States
- Participants: Illegal slave trader kidnappers, police, criminals, and captured free blacks
- Outcome: The selling of free negroes, and forced return of fugitive slaves into Southern slavery, ended with the Union victory in the American Civil War and the passing of the U.S. Constitution's Thirteenth Amendment abolishing slavery and the Fourteenth Amendment giving freed slaves citizenship rights.
- Deaths: Unknown

The pre-American Civil War practice of kidnapping into slavery in the United States occurred in both free and slave states, and both fugitive slaves and free negroes were transported to slave markets and sold, often multiple times. There were lucrative rewards given for the return of fugitives. Three types of kidnapping methods were employed: physical abduction, inveiglement (kidnapping through trickery) of free blacks, and apprehension of fugitives. The enslavement, or re-enslavement, of free blacks occurred for 85 years, from 1780 to 1865. Kidnapping of black children for resale was a consistent issue throughout the slavery period.

The term Reverse Underground Railroad has been retroactively applied to the clandestine network of slave traffickers who abducted free blacks for reward amounts ranging from $400 to $700 (estimated to be $9,000 to $15,000 by 2019 standards). Although the Underground Railroad—the network of abolitionists and their sympathizers who helped smuggle escaped slaves to freedom, generally to Canada but also to Mexico—is far more celebrated and written about, the Reverse Underground Railroad was just as active as its counterpart. Historian Richard Bell writes that the "professional kidnappers left their mark everywhere and spirited into slavery roughly as many African Americans as Tubman and her comrades and collaborators ever assisted in escaping from it."

== Prevalence ==
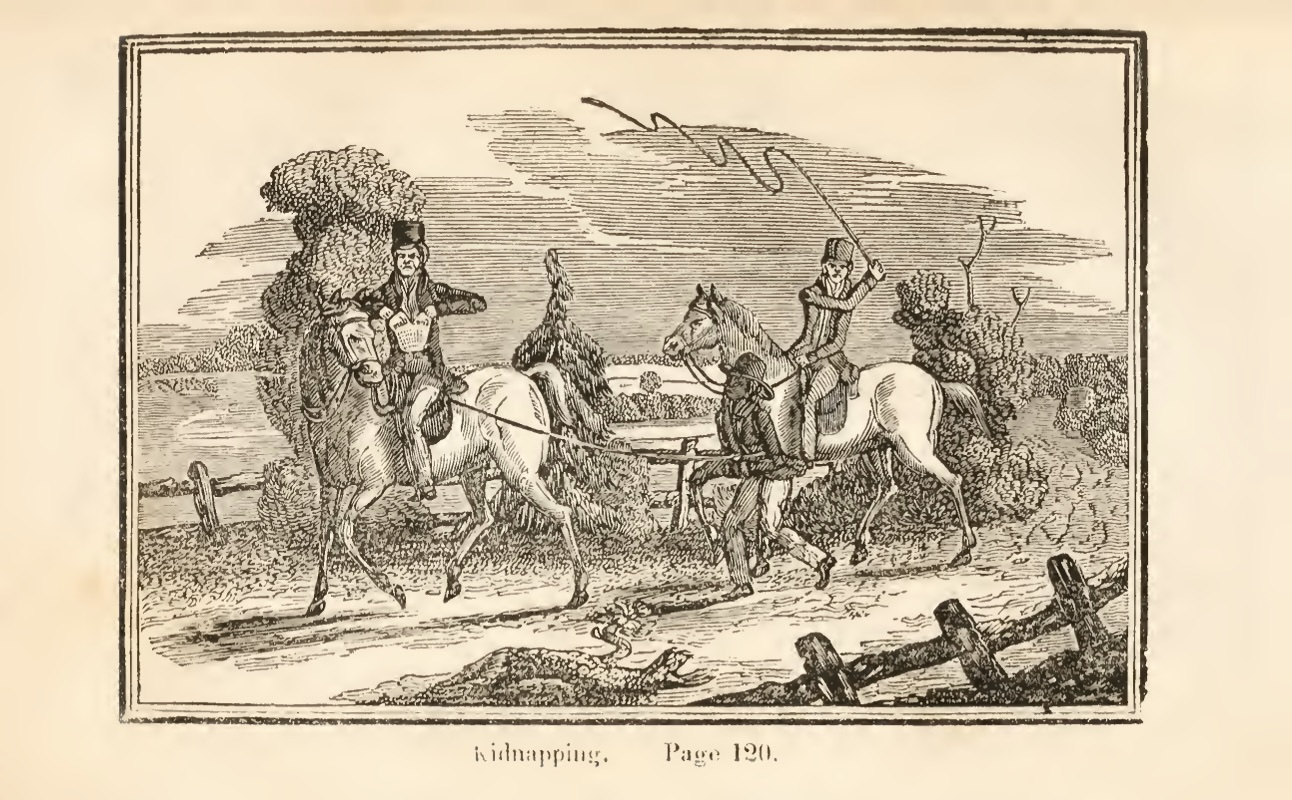
"Kidnapping" (Picture of Slavery in the United States of America by Rev. George Bourne, published by Edwin Hunt in Middletown, Connecticut, 1834)

Free Blacks were most frequently kidnapped from the border states, including Delaware, Maryland, Kentucky, and Missouri. But kidnapping was also prevalent in states farther north, such as New York, Pennsylvania, and Illinois, as well as in abolition-minded regions of some Southern states, such as Tennessee.

=== New York and Pennsylvania ===
Free Blacks in New York City and Philadelphia were particularly vulnerable to kidnapping. In New York, a gang known as 'the black-birders' regularly waylaid men, women and children, sometimes with the support and participation of policemen and city officials. In Philadelphia, black newspapers often featured missing children notices, including one for the 14-year-old daughter of the newspaper's editor. Children were particularly susceptible to kidnapping; in a two-year period, at least a hundred children were abducted in Philadelphia alone. In 1826, Rhode Island newspaper editors recounted having met slave catchers and an enslaved man at a tavern in western Alabama. After the traders passed out from drinking, the editors interviewed the slave, who had been chained to a post in the tavern. The Rhode Island paper recounted:

"He informed us he was a native of the city of New-York, had been employed on board of a collier vessel running between that city and Richmond, Virginia, and that whilst at Norfolk, the master of the vessel, who had become involved a difficulties, by his own dissipation, sold him to a slave dealer, who took him to the interior of Virginia, where he was sold to a planter, in whose service he remained, till after making several attempts to escape from bondage, he was sold to an Alabama trader, to whom, by purchase, he now belonged, and at whose hands he met with the most savage treatment. He farther informed us, that a few days previous, he had absconded, and had nearly reached the Ohio River, when he was overtaken; and was then on his way back to the plantation of CONOLL WISTER, where he expected to meet the most savage treatment for his temerity. He was intelligent and interesting; and anxious to discover whether he were free or not, we questioned him relative to the location of the city of New York, its streets, inhabitants, public edifices and climate, and were perfectly satisfied the tale he told was scrupulously true."

=== Delaware, Maryland, and Virginia ===
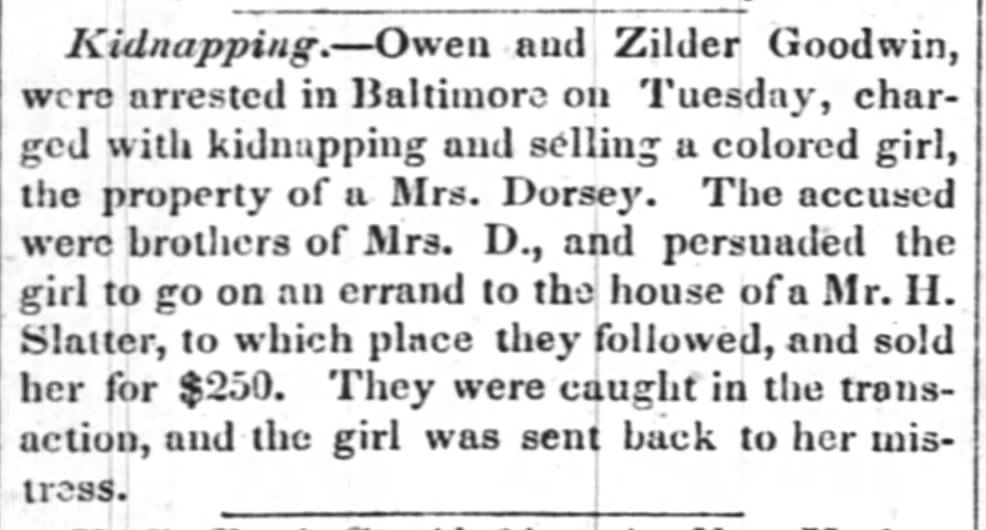
"The house of Mr. H. Slatter" would have been Hope H. Slatter's slave jail in Baltimore ("Kidnapping" New Orleans Times-Picayune, February 25, 1841)

From 1811 to 1829, Martha "Patty" Cannon was the leader of a gang that kidnapped slaves and free blacks from the Delmarva Peninsula of Delaware, Maryland, Virginia, and Chesapeake Bay, and transported and sold them to plantation owners located farther south. She was indicted for four murders in 1829 and died in prison while awaiting trial, purportedly as a result of suicide via arsenic poisoning.

In 1906, newspapers reported on the death and funeral of a former enslaved woman named Mary Marlow. She had recounted that "when she was a girl, about twelve years old, she was on a fence near Richmond, Va., seeing a procession go by in honor of Lafayette, and she was stolen, taken to Georgia by slave traders and became the property of Hon. Francis V. De Launey [of Milledgeville, Georgia]."

=== Illinois ===
John Hart Crenshaw was a large landowner, salt maker, and slave trader, from the 1820s to the 1850s, based out of the southeastern part of Illinois in Gallatin County and a business associate of Kentucky lawman and outlaw, James Ford. Crenshaw and Ford were allegedly kidnapping free blacks in southeastern Illinois and selling them in the slave state of Kentucky. Although Illinois was a free state, Crenshaw leased the salt works in nearby Equality, Illinois from the U.S. Government, which permitted the use of slaves for the arduous labor of hauling and boiling salt brine water from local salt springs to produce salt. Due to Crenshaw's keeping and "breeding" of slaves and kidnapping of free blacks, who were then pressed into slavery, his house became popularly known as The Old Slave House.

Other cases of the Reverse Underground Railroad in Illinois occurred in the southwestern and western parts of the state, along the Mississippi River bordering the slave state of Missouri. In 1860, John and Nancy Curtis were arrested for trying to kidnap their own freed slaves in Johnson County, Illinois to sell back into slavery in Missouri. Free blacks were also kidnapped in Jersey County, Illinois and taken away to be sold as slaves in Missouri.

=== Southern states ===
Black sailors who voyaged to southern states faced the threat of kidnapping. South Carolina passed the Negro Seamen Act in 1822 out of fear that free black sailors would inspire slave revolts, requiring that they be incarcerated while their ship was docked. This could lead to black sailors being sold into slavery if their captains did not pay fees resulting from them being jailed, or if their freedom papers were lost.

In the 1820s–1830s, John A. Murrell led an outlaw gang in western Tennessee. He was once caught with a freed slave living on his property. His tactics were to kidnap slaves from their plantations, promise them their freedom, and instead sell them back to other slave owners. If Murrell was in danger of being caught with kidnapped slaves, he would kill the slaves to escape being arrested with stolen property, which was considered a major crime in the Southern United States. In 1834, Murrell was arrested and sentenced to ten years in the Tennessee State Penitentiary in Nashville for slave-stealing.

In 1839, the governor of South Carolina placed a notice in the newspapers about two seven-year-olds who had been taken from a plantation in the Colleton District by persons unknown; Harry would have been able to tell someone his parents were Prince and Fanny; also the case for Sary, whose parents were Scipio and Diana.

== Routes ==
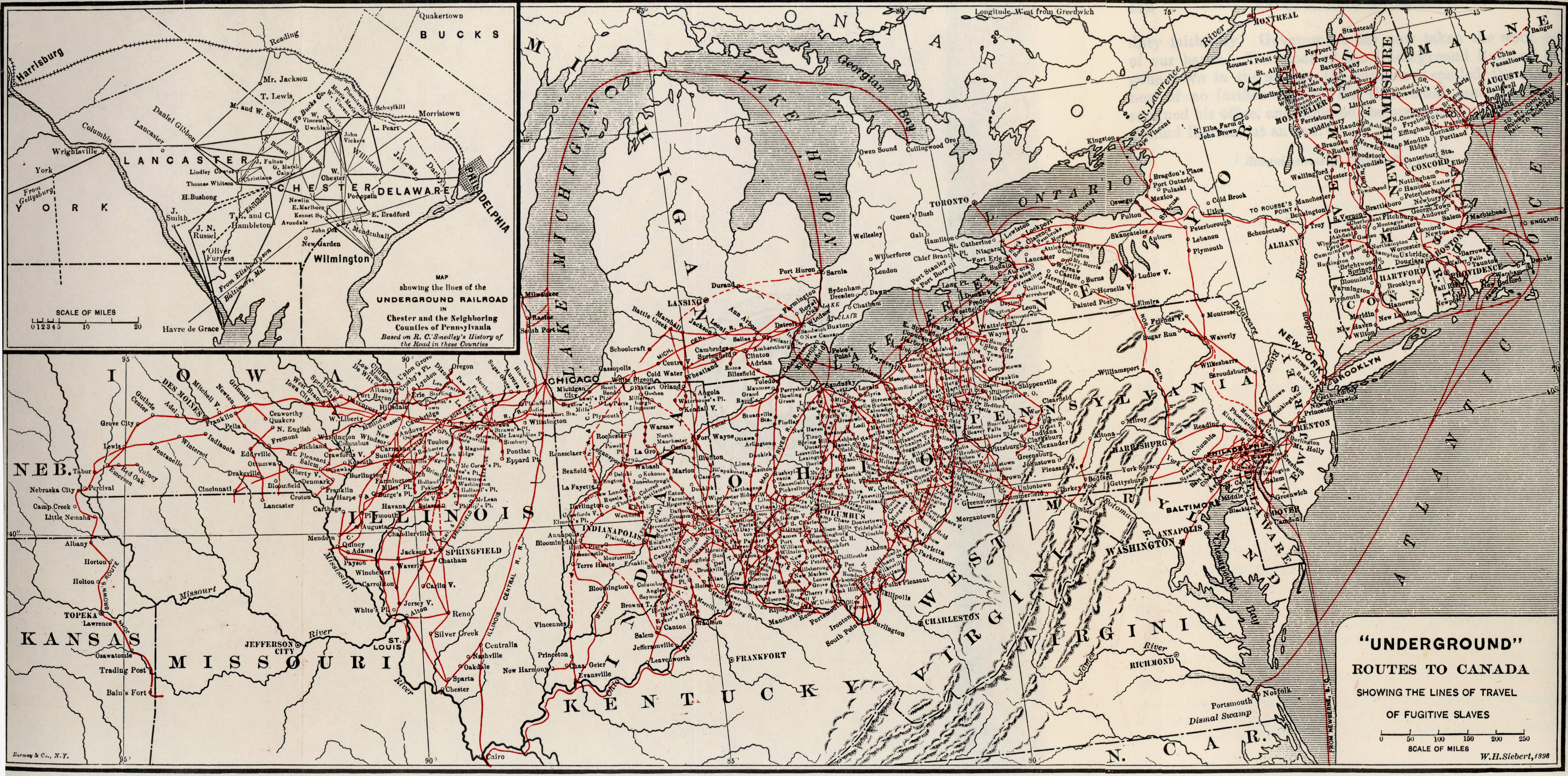
The opposite of the enslavement of Reverse Underground Railroad was the freedom of the Underground Railroad showing the routes on a map that led thousands of runaway slaves to liberation in the Northern United States, Canada, and Mexico

The 1827 newspaper The African Observer described how several Philadelphia children were lured on board a small sloop, at anchor in the Delaware River, with the promise of peaches, oranges and watermelons, then immediately put into the hold of the ship in chains, where they took a week-long journey by ship. Once landed, they were marched through brushwood, swamp and cornfields to the home of Joe Johnson and Jesse and Patty Cannon, on the line between Delaware and Maryland, where they were "kept in irons for a considerable amount of time". From there, they were again put on board another vessel for a week or more, where one of the children heard someone talking about Chesapeake Bay, in Maryland. Once landed, they were marched again for 'many hundred miles' through Alabama until they reached Rocky Springs, Mississippi. The same article described a chain of Reverse Underground Railroad posts "established from Pennsylvania to Louisiana".

In the West, kidnappers rode the waters of the Ohio River, stealing slaves in Kentucky and kidnapping free people in southern Ohio, Indiana, and Illinois, who were then transported to the slave states.

A free Black sailor named Stephen Dickenson was shanghaied in New Orleans by his ship captain and a slave trader, who eventually sold Dickenson and a number of other kidnapped African-American sailors at the slave market in Vicksburg, Mississippi.

=== Travel conditions ===
Many kidnapped black people were marched to the South on foot. The men were chained together to prevent escape, while the women and children tended to be less restricted.

== Prevention and rescue ==
As early as 1775, Anthony Benezet and others met in Philadelphia and organized the Society for the Relief of Free Negroes Unlawfully held in Bondage to focus on intervention in the cases of blacks and Indians who claimed to have been illegally enslaved. This group was later reorganized as the biracial Pennsylvania Abolition Society. The Protecting Society of Philadelphia, an auxiliary of the Pennsylvania Abolition Society, was established in 1827 for "the prevention of kidnapping and man-stealing". In January 1837, The New York Vigilance Committee reported that it had protected 335 persons from slavery. David A. Ruggles, a black newspaper editor and treasurer of the organization, writes in his paper of his futile attempts to convince two New York judges to prevent illegal kidnapping, as well as a daring successful physical rescue of a young girl named Charity Walker from the New York home of her captors.

State and city governments had difficulty in preventing kidnappings, even before the Fugitive Slave Act of 1850. The Pennsylvania Abolition Society compared records of apprehended blacks to try to free those who were wrongfully detained, kept a list of missing people who were potential abductees, and formed the Committee on Kidnapping. However, these efforts proved to be expensive, rendering them unable to work effectively due to their lack of sustainability.

Citizens, particularly free black citizens, were active in lobbying local governments to adopt stronger measures against kidnapping. In 1800, Richard Allen and Absalom Jones sent a petition to Congress from 73 prominent free Black citizens urging a stop to the kidnappings. It was ignored. Due to the lack of effectiveness from government institutions, free blacks were frequently forced to use their own methods to protect themselves and their families. Such methods included keeping proof of their freedom with them at all times and avoiding contact with strangers as well as certain areas. Vigilante groups were also formed to attack kidnappers, including black kidnappers, the latter of whom were universally condemned by the free African-American community.

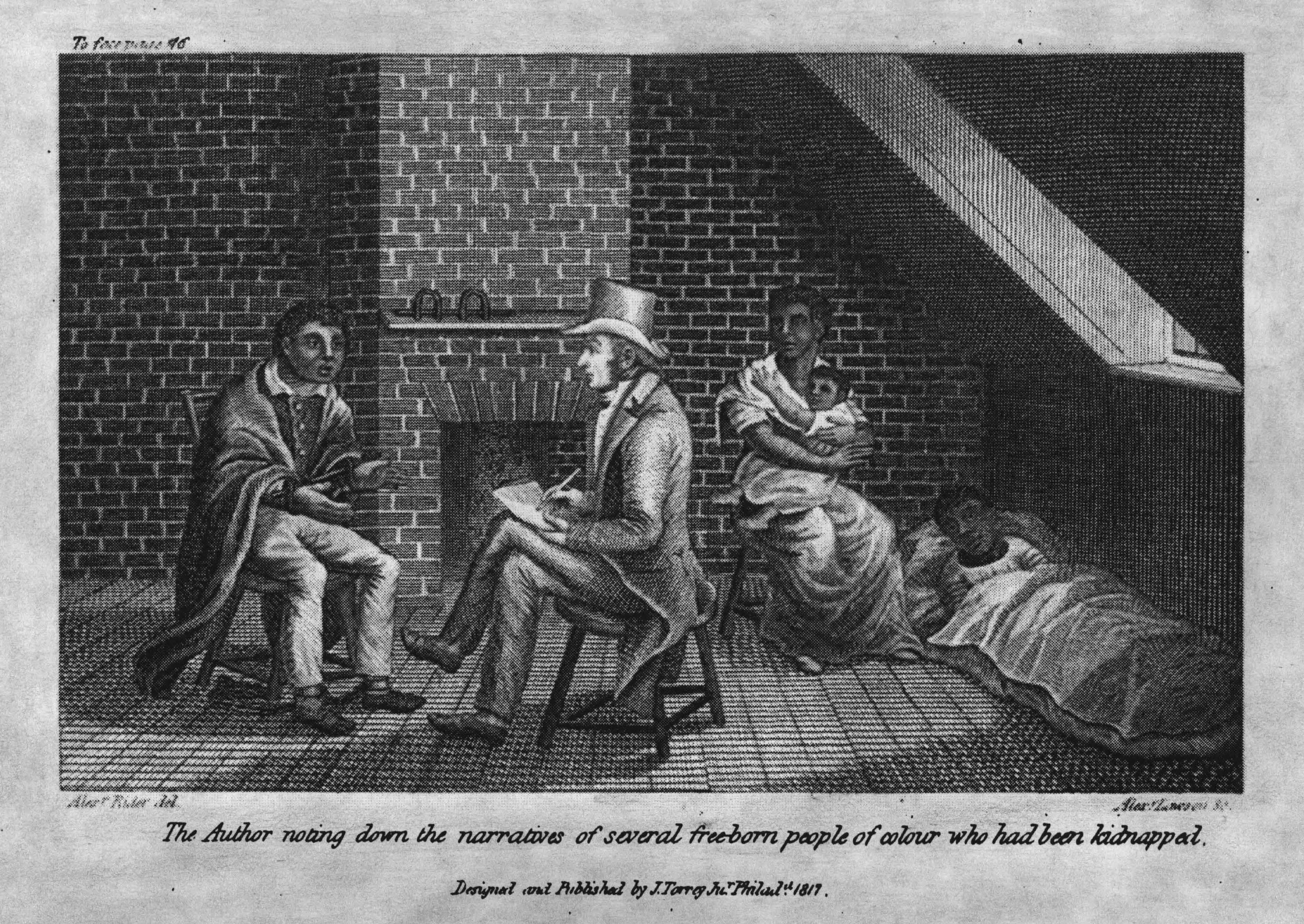
Jesse Torrey, Jr., depicted recording the narrative of free people who had been kidnapped

From Philadelphia, high constable Samuel Parker Garrigues took several trips to Southern states at the behest of mayor Joseph Watson to rescue children and adults who had been kidnapped from the city's streets. He also successfully went after their abductors. One such case was Charles Bailey, kidnapped at fourteen in 1825 and finally rescued by Garrigues after a three-year search. Unfortunately, the beaten and emaciated youth died a few days after being brought back to Philadelphia. Garrigues was able to find and arrest Bailey's abductor, Captain John Smith, alias Thomas Collins, head of "The Johnson Gang". He also tracked down and arrested John Purnell of the Patty Cannon gang. Watson publicized the hunt for the kidnappers in several newspapers, offering a $500 reward. On one occasion, a courageous 15 year old Black boy named Sam Scomp spoke out about his kidnapping during his attempted sale to a white southern planter named John Hamilton. The planter himself contacted Mayor Watson to arrange a rescue of the boy and another kidnapped youth.

== Recipients of stolen goods ==
Slavery in Alabama (1950) recounts two stories illustrating the difficulty of escaping once sold south. In the first, two family members were able to prove they were stolen and legally free in the north, but the Alabama courts simply never addressed the claim, just passing it forward for years. In another case, the buying family had no guilt about owning a legally free person:

Back home in Maryland, Jesse said, he and his family had been free. His father had owned a good home and a small farm on the outskirts of a thrifty village. When Jesse was a stalwart lad of eighteen, he had gone on an errand to the shores of Chesapeake Bay. There slave traders seized him. They carried him to Richmond and sold him on the slave block, paying no attention to his protestations that he was free. He was taken from Richmond to Montgomery and there bought by the Goldthwaites. He had been in that family for fifty years. Jesse had told the Goldthwaites his story, but, although his mistress sympathized with him, neither she nor his master thought there was anything they could do about it—they had bought him in good faith. Rebellion, curbed by stern discipline, had gradually, through the years, given way to despair. Jesse had been, he said, a desperate character until he had come under the influence of Dr. Tichenor. But now that the slaves were free it had occurred to him to try to get in touch again with his family in Maryland. Dr. Tichenor helped him write the letters he suggested, but they were unanswered. Jesse never found again the family from whom he had been stolen.

== In popular culture ==
In 1853, Solomon Northup published Twelve Years a Slave, a memoir of his kidnapping from New York and twelve years spent as a slave in Louisiana. His book sold 30,000 copies upon release. His narrative was made into a 2013 film, which won three Academy Awards.

Abolitionist publications frequently used accounts of people who were kidnapped into slavery for their publications. Notable works that published these accounts include The African Observer, a monthly publication that used firsthand accounts to demonstrate the evils of slavery, as well as Isaac Hopper's Tales of Oppression, a compilation by the abolitionist Isaac Hopper of kidnapping accounts.

== Notable kidnappers ==
- Patty Cannon and Cannon-Johnson Gang
- John Hart Crenshaw
- John A. Murrell

== Notable victims ==
- Solomon Northup
- Cornelius Sinclair
- The sons of Jude Hall

== Gallery ==
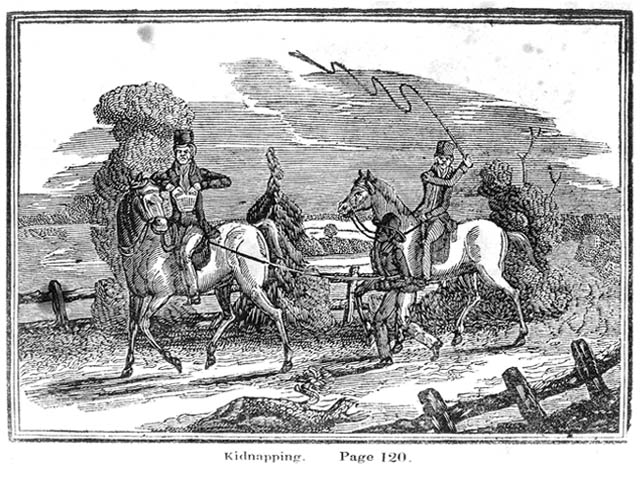
Kidnapping of a free Black man, in the U.S. free states, to be sold into Southern slavery, from an 1834 Boston abolitionist anti-slavery almanac

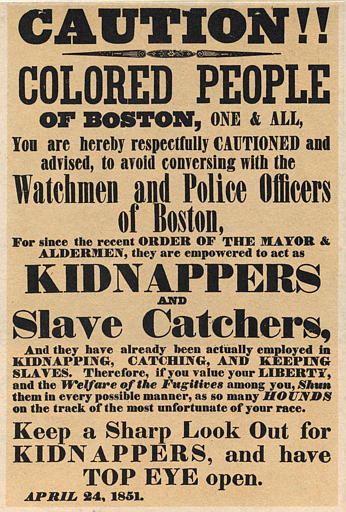
An April 24, 1851, abolitionist poster warning the "Colored People of Boston" about policemen acting as "Kidnappers and Slave Catchers"

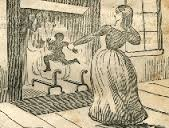
Patty Cannon of the Delmarva Peninsula of Delaware

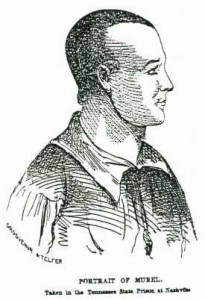
John A. Murrell of western Tennessee

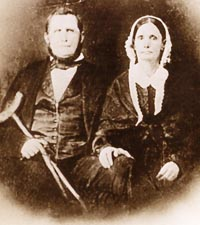
John Hart Crenshaw, of southeastern Illinois, with his wife, Francine "Sina" Taylor

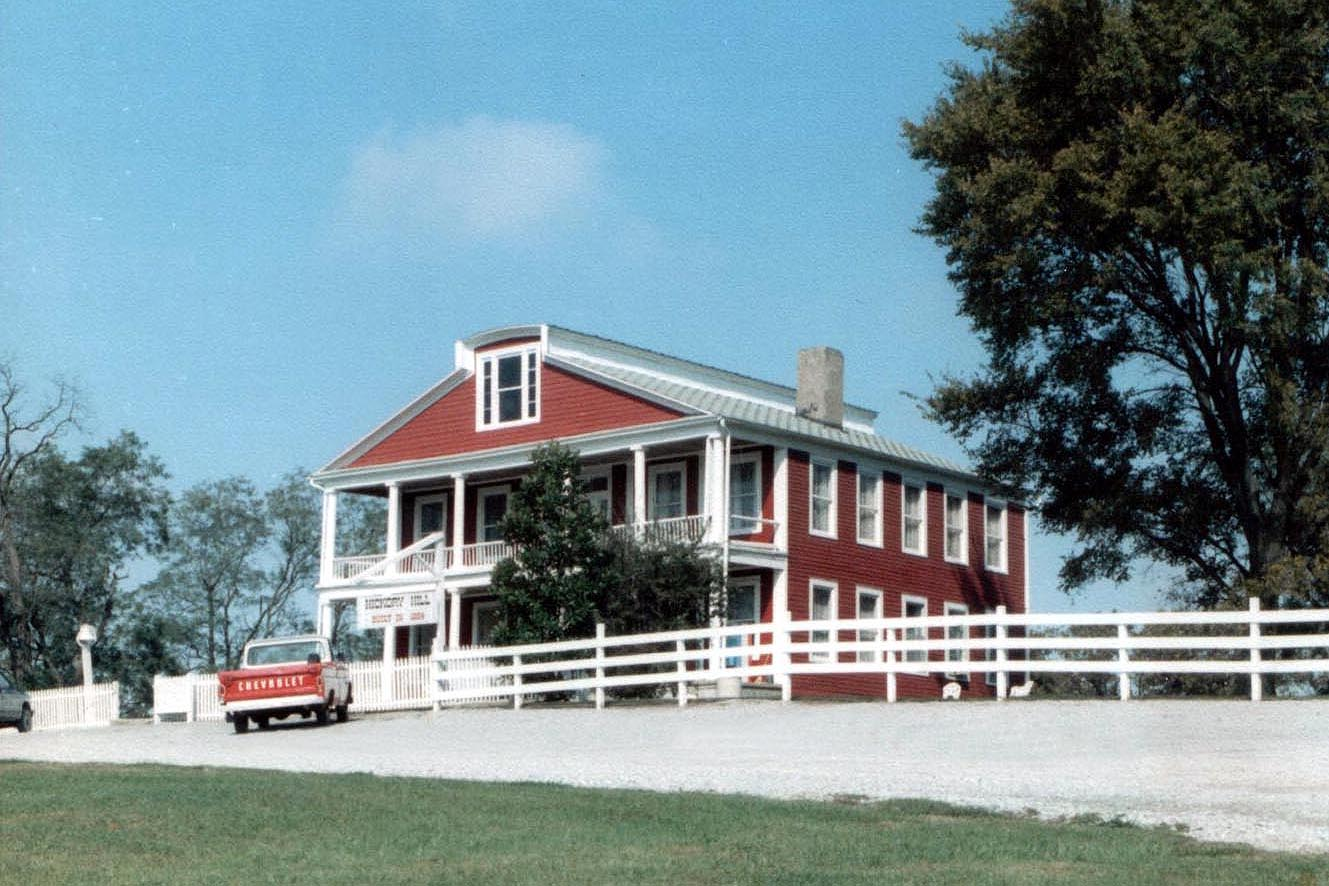
John Hart Crenshaw's Hickory Hill mansion, in Gallatin County, Illinois, infamously known as the "Old Slave House"

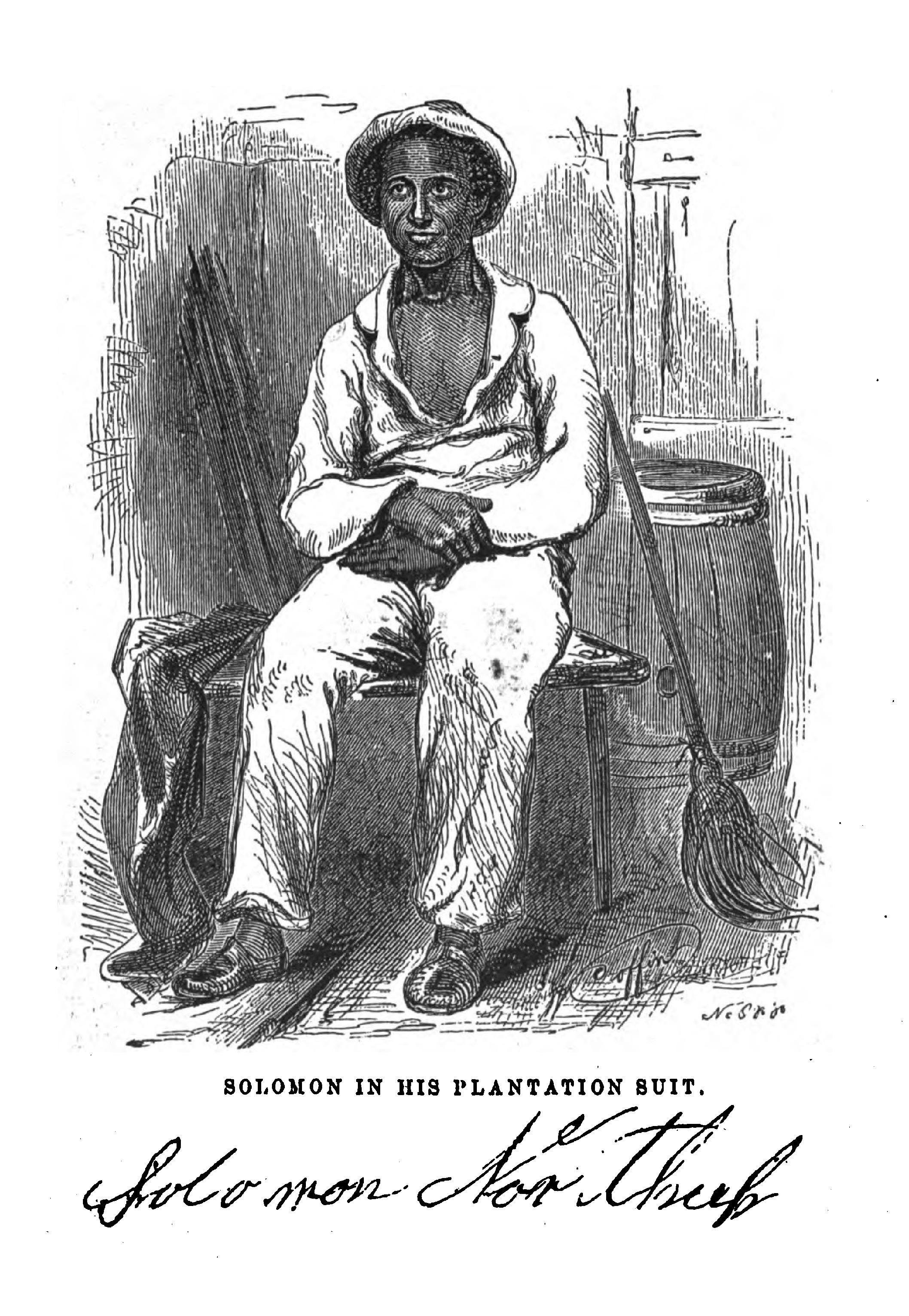
Solomon Northup, a free black born in New York who was later kidnapped by slave catchers

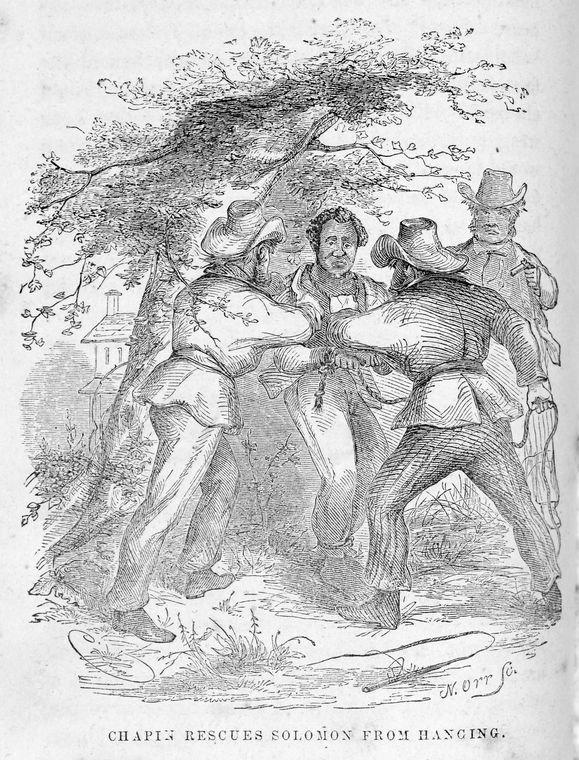
An illustration from Twelve Years A Slave, the memoir of Solomon Northup, 1853: "Rescues Solomon from Hanging"

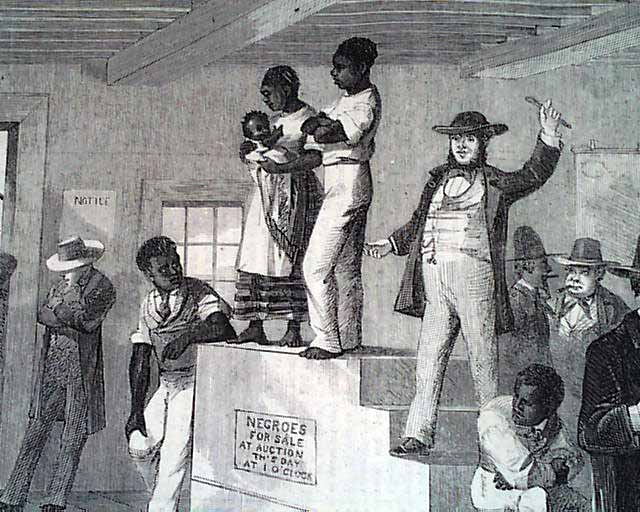
A typical 19th century slave auction in the Southern United States

== See also ==
- Black Codes (United States)
- Fugitive Slave Act of 1850
- Judicial aspects of race in the United States
- Jim Crow laws
- Delphine LaLaurie
- Racial segregation in the United States
- Slave catcher
- Slave codes
- Sundown town
- Slavery in the United States
- Underground Railroad
