= Lake of Egypt =

- Location within Illinois Location within the United States

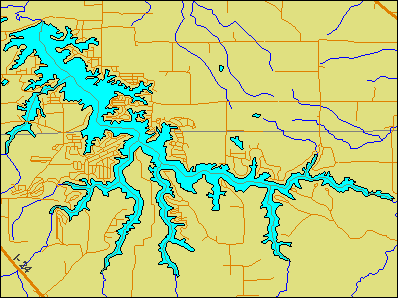
- Map - the lake's irregular shape reveals its origins as a dammed river amidst hilly terrain.
- Location: Williamson and Johnson Counties, Little Egypt region, Illinois
- Coordinates: 37°37′30″N 88°57′30″W
- Type: Reservoir
- Primary inflows: Saline River
- Primary outflows: Saline River
- Basin countries: United States
- Surface area: 2,300 acres (9 km²)
- Average depth: 18 ft (5.5 m)
- Max. depth: 52 ft (16 m)
- Shore length^{1}: 90 mi (140 km)
- Surface elevation: 466 feet (142 m)
- ^{1} Shore length is not a well-defined measure.

Lake of Egypt is a reservoir in the Little Egypt region of the U.S. state of Illinois. It is located six miles (10 km) south of Marion, Illinois and covers 2,300 acres (9 km²) with 90 miles (140 km) of shoreline. The lake has an average depth of 18 feet (5.5 m) with a maximum depth of 52 feet (16 m) . The lake is owned by the Southern Illinois Power Cooperative (SIPC), who created the impoundment in 1962, by damming the South fork of the Saline River, to supply cooling water for a coal-burning electric power plant.

As a privately owned lake, it is subject to regulation by its owners and the state. Terms of use from the SIPC are in the "Official Lake of Egypt Rules and Regulations". Public access is allowed as are all size boat motors. Waterskiing and jet skis are also permitted in most of the lake. Fishing includes Bluegill, Largemouth Bass, Channel Catfish, Striped Bass, and Crappie. Camping at the lake is allowed at Buck Ridge Campground, part of the Shawnee National Forest. Each neighborhood on the lake has individual subdivisions (list of Lake of Egypt subdivisions) as well as the non-for-profit Lake of Egypt Association of Property Owners (LEAPO)

== History ==
Lake of Egypt was founded by Southern Illinois Power Cooperative (SIPC) to supply cooling water to their newly constructed coal burning power plant. The lake was created in 1962 by damming the south fork of the Saline River. The name was chosen from the nickname "Little Egypt" of Southern Illinois.

== Tourism and Recreation ==
There are currently three marinas serving Lake of Egypt:

- The Resort at Egyptian Hills
- Mack's Lake of Egypt Marina
- Pyramid Acres
