= Equality, Illinois =

Village in Illinois, United States

- Village
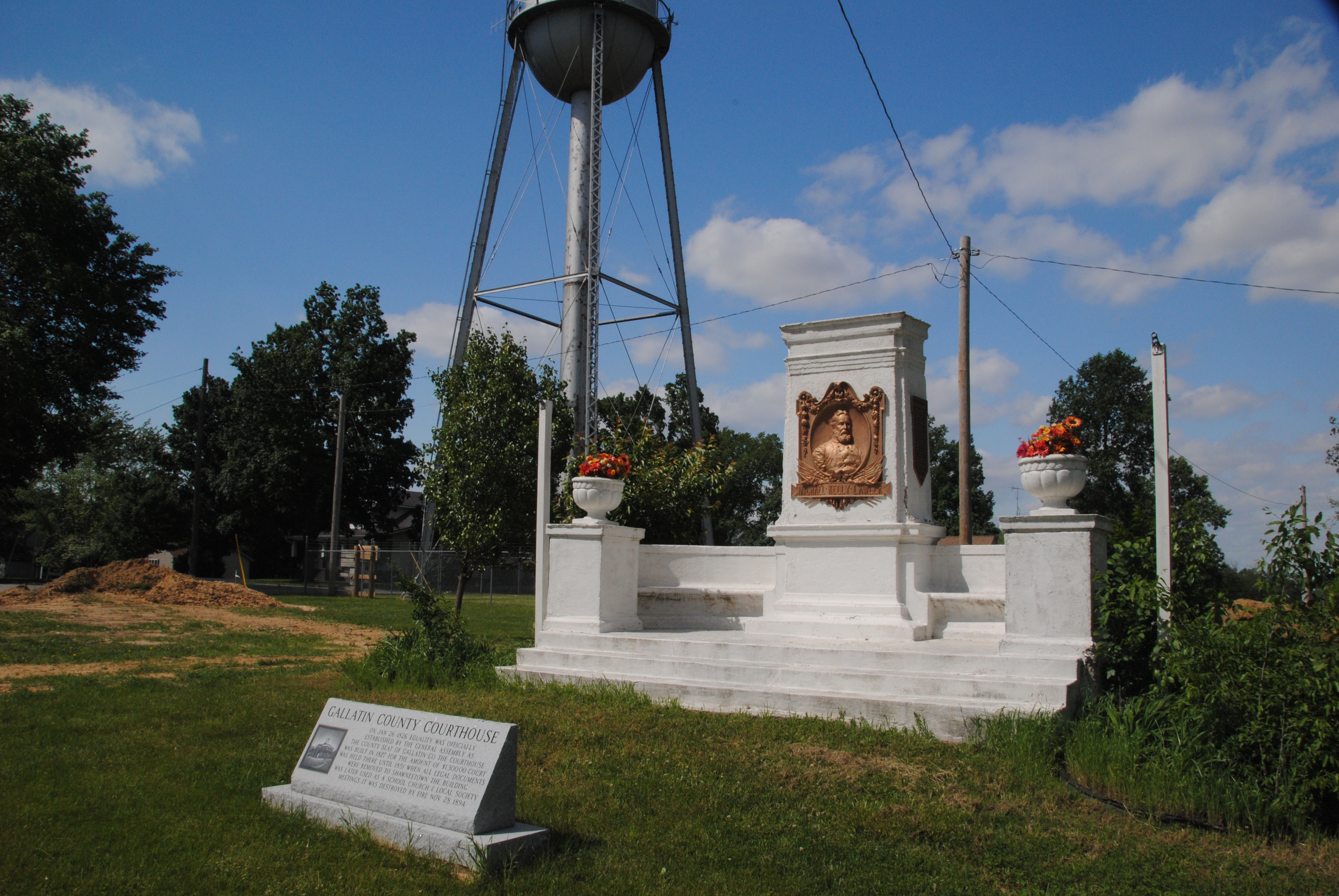
- Monument honoring Michael Kelly Lawler on the former site of the Gallatin County Courthouse

- Location of Equality in Gallatin County, Illinois.
- Coordinates: 37°44′14″N 88°20′32″W
- Country: United States
- State: Illinois
- County: Gallatin
- Township: Equality

Area
  - Total: 0.90 sq mi (2.33 km^{2})
  - Land: 0.88 sq mi (2.27 km^{2})
  - Water: 0.019 sq mi (0.05 km^{2})
- Elevation: 427 ft (130 m)

Population (2020)
  - Total: 539
  - Density: 614.3/sq mi (237.19/km^{2})
- Time zone: UTC-6 (CST)
  - Summer (DST): UTC-5 (CDT)
- ZIP code: 62934
- Area code: 618
- FIPS code: 17-24348
- GNIS ID: 2398838

Equality is a village in Equality Township, Gallatin County, Illinois, United States. The population was 539 at the 2020 census. Near the village are two points of interest, the Crenshaw House and the Garden of the Gods Wilderness. Equality was the county seat of Gallatin County from 1826–1851.

== History ==
On Jan. 26, 1826, Equality was officially established by the General Assembly as the county seat of Gallatin County. The courthouse was built in 1827 for the amount of $1,300.00. Court was held there until 1851, when all legal documents were removed to Shawneetown. The building was later used as a school, church and local society meetings. It was destroyed by fire Nov. 28, 1894.

=== Salt Works ===
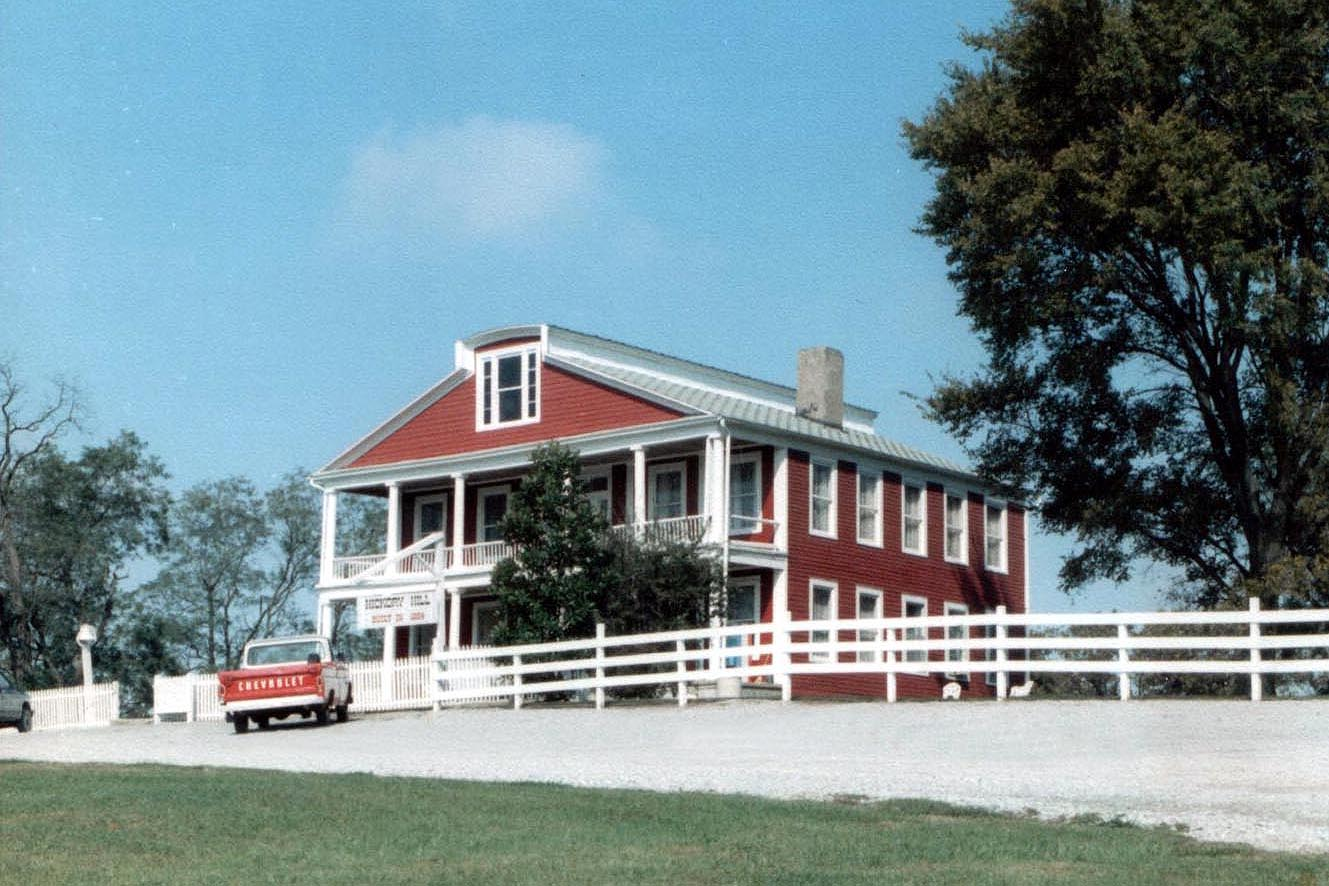
1970s photograph of the Old Slave House.

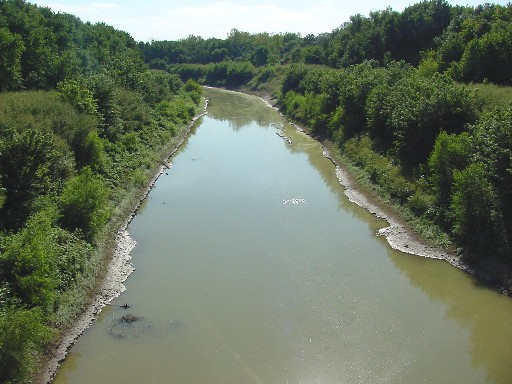
The Saline River of southeastern Illinois near the U.S. Salines, in Equality, Illinois, where leased out Kentucky slaves boiled down salt brine water from the river into usable salt for sale.

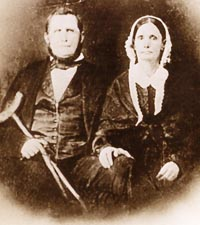
John Crenshaw, a notorious illegal kidnapper slave trader, holding a crutch, for support because of a missing leg severed in an attack by an axe-wielding slave, with his wife, Francine "Sina" Taylor. This photograph, which is the only known photograph of them, was taken on an unknown date.

French settlers extracted salt near Equality as early as 1735, while Native Americans made salt here long before then. In 1803, the American Indians ceded their "Great Salt Springs" to the US government by treaty. The government then leased the springs, requiring the holder to produce a certain quantity of salt each year or pay a penalty. The salt works is referred to as the "United States Saline" in old documents.

Isaac White was in charge of the salt works in 1811. White volunteered for the Indiana Militia that year, and was killed at the Battle of Tippecanoe.

Special territorial laws permitted exceptions to anti-slavery treaties at these salines, and slaves were used extensively in manufacturing salt. The census of 1820 for Gallatin County listed 239 slaves or servants.

During the 1820s, Gallatin County included what is now Saline County as its western half. In 1826, the county seat was moved from Old Shawneetown, on the eastern edge of the county, to the new village of Equality, near the center of what was then Gallatin County. Equality remained the county seat until the formation of Saline County in 1847.

In 1838, a local salt maker and illegal slave trader, John Hart Crenshaw, began building his manor house at Hickory Hill just five miles east of Equality; he used the house for his business of kidnapping free blacks and breeding slaves to sell into slavery as part of the Reverse Underground Railroad.

The Great Salt Springs are located southeast of Equality, on federal land along the south bank of the Saline River, seven-tenths of a mile west of Illinois Route 1 on Salt Well Road. Half Moon Lick, where the saltworks first developed as a large industry, is on private property southwest of Equality.

== Geography ==
Equality is located in western Gallatin County on the north side of the Saline River, a southeast-flowing tributary of the Ohio River.

According to the 2010 census, Equality has a total area of 0.906 square miles (2.35 km^{2}), of which 0.89 square miles (2.31 km^{2}) (or 98.23%) is land and 0.016 square miles (0.04 km^{2}) (or 1.77%) is water.

== Demographics ==
Historical population
| Census | Pop. | Note | %± |
|---|---|---|---|
| 1860 | 369 | | — |
| 1870 | 356 | | −3.5% |
| 1880 | 500 | | 40.4% |
| 1890 | 622 | | 24.4% |
| 1900 | 898 | | 44.4% |
| 1910 | 1,180 | | 31.4% |
| 1920 | 1,332 | | 12.9% |
| 1930 | 830 | | −37.7% |
| 1940 | 971 | | 17.0% |
| 1950 | 830 | | −14.5% |
| 1960 | 665 | | −19.9% |
| 1970 | 732 | | 10.1% |
| 1980 | 831 | | 13.5% |
| 1990 | 748 | | −10.0% |
| 2000 | 721 | | −3.6% |
| 2010 | 595 | | −17.5% |
| 2020 | 539 | | −9.4% |
U.S. Decennial Census

As of the 2020 census there were 539 people, 218 households, and 129 families residing in the village. The population density was 600.22 inhabitants per square mile (231.75/km^{2}). There were 280 housing units at an average density of 311.80 per square mile (120.39/km^{2}). The racial makeup of the village was 96.67% White, 0.19% Asian, 0.19% from other races, and 2.97% from two or more races. Hispanic or Latino of any race were 2.04% of the population.

There were 218 households, out of which 27.5% had children under the age of 18 living with them, 36.70% were married couples living together, 20.64% had a female householder with no husband present.

The median income for a household in the village was $40,833, and the median income for a family was $48,750. About 20.9% of the population were below the poverty line, including 12.9% of those under age 18 and 15.3% of those age 65 or over.
