= Shawneetown, Illinois =

- City
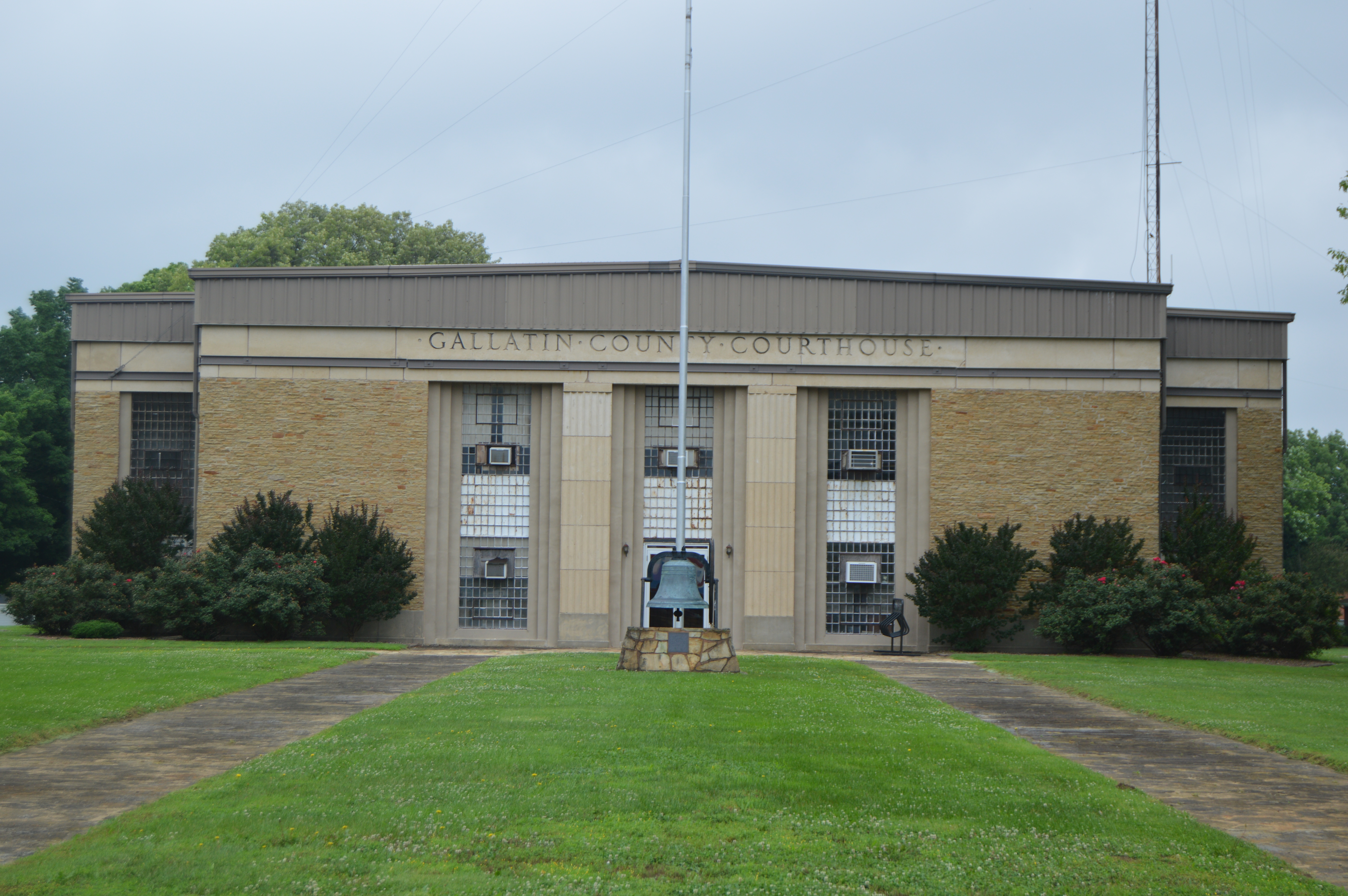
- Gallatin County Courthouse
- Interactive map of Shawneetown, Illinois
- Location within Illinois Location within the United States
- Coordinates: 37°42′57″N 88°11′11″W
- Country: United States
- State: Illinois
- County: Gallatin
- Township: Gold Hill

Area
  - Total: 0.74 sq mi (1.92 km^{2})
  - Land: 0.73 sq mi (1.90 km^{2})
  - Water: 0.0077 sq mi (0.02 km^{2})
- Elevation: 407 ft (124 m)

Population (2020)
  - Total: 1,054
  - Density: 1,435.6/sq mi (554.28/km^{2})
- Time zone: UTC-6 (CST)
  - Summer (DST): UTC-5 (CDT)
- ZIP code: 62984
- Area code: 618
- FIPS code: 17-69082
- GNIS ID: 2395860
- Website: cityofshawneetown.com

Shawneetown is a city in Gallatin County, Illinois, United States. The population was 1,054 at the 2020 census. It is the county seat of Gallatin County.

== History ==
The present town was established in 1937 after the Ohio River flood of 1937 inundated what is now Old Shawneetown, Illinois.

== Geography ==
Shawneetown is located southeast of the center of Gallatin County. Illinois Route 13 passes through the city, leading southeast 3 miles (5 km) to the Ohio River and the Kentucky border at Old Shawneetown, and west 20 miles (32 km) to Harrisburg. It is located at the northeast edge of Shawnee National Forest.

== Demographics ==
Historical population
Census	Pop.	Note	%±
1940	1,963		—
1950	1,917		−2.3%
1960	1,280		−33.2%
1970	1,742		36.1%
1980	1,841		5.7%
1990	1,575		−14.4%
2000	1,410		−10.5%
2010	1,239		−12.1%
2020	1,054		−14.9%
U.S. Decennial Census

=== 2020 census ===
As of the 2020 census, Shawneetown had a population of 1,054. The median age was 46.6 years. 21.4% of residents were under the age of 18 and 24.3% were 65 years of age or older. For every 100 females, there were 89.6 males, and for every 100 females age 18 and over, there were 87.8 males age 18 and over.

0.0% of residents lived in urban areas, while 100.0% lived in rural areas.

There were 468 households in Shawneetown, of which 25.4% had children under the age of 18 living in them. Of all households, 40.0% were married-couple households, 20.5% were households with a male householder and no spouse or partner present, and 33.8% were households with a female householder and no spouse or partner present. About 36.7% of all households were made up of individuals, and 20.8% had someone living alone who was 65 years of age or older.

There were 559 housing units, of which 16.3% were vacant. The homeowner vacancy rate was 3.4%, and the rental vacancy rate was 19.8%.

Racial composition as of the 2020 census
Race	Number	Percent
White	971	92.1%
Black or African American	12	1.1%
American Indian and Alaska Native	4	0.4%
Asian	7	0.7%
Native Hawaiian and Other Pacific Islander	0	0.0%
Some other race	13	1.2%
Two or more races	47	4.5%
Hispanic or Latino (of any race)	23	2.2%

=== Income and poverty ===
The median income for a household was $40,231, and the median income for a family was $44,554.

== Notable people ==
- John R. Anderson (1818–1863), Baptist minister and educator
- Henry Rollmann (1853–1927), politician
- William W. Wilshire (1830–1888), politician and judge
