= Illinois Salines =

Archaeological site in Illinois, United States

- U.S. National Register of Historic Places
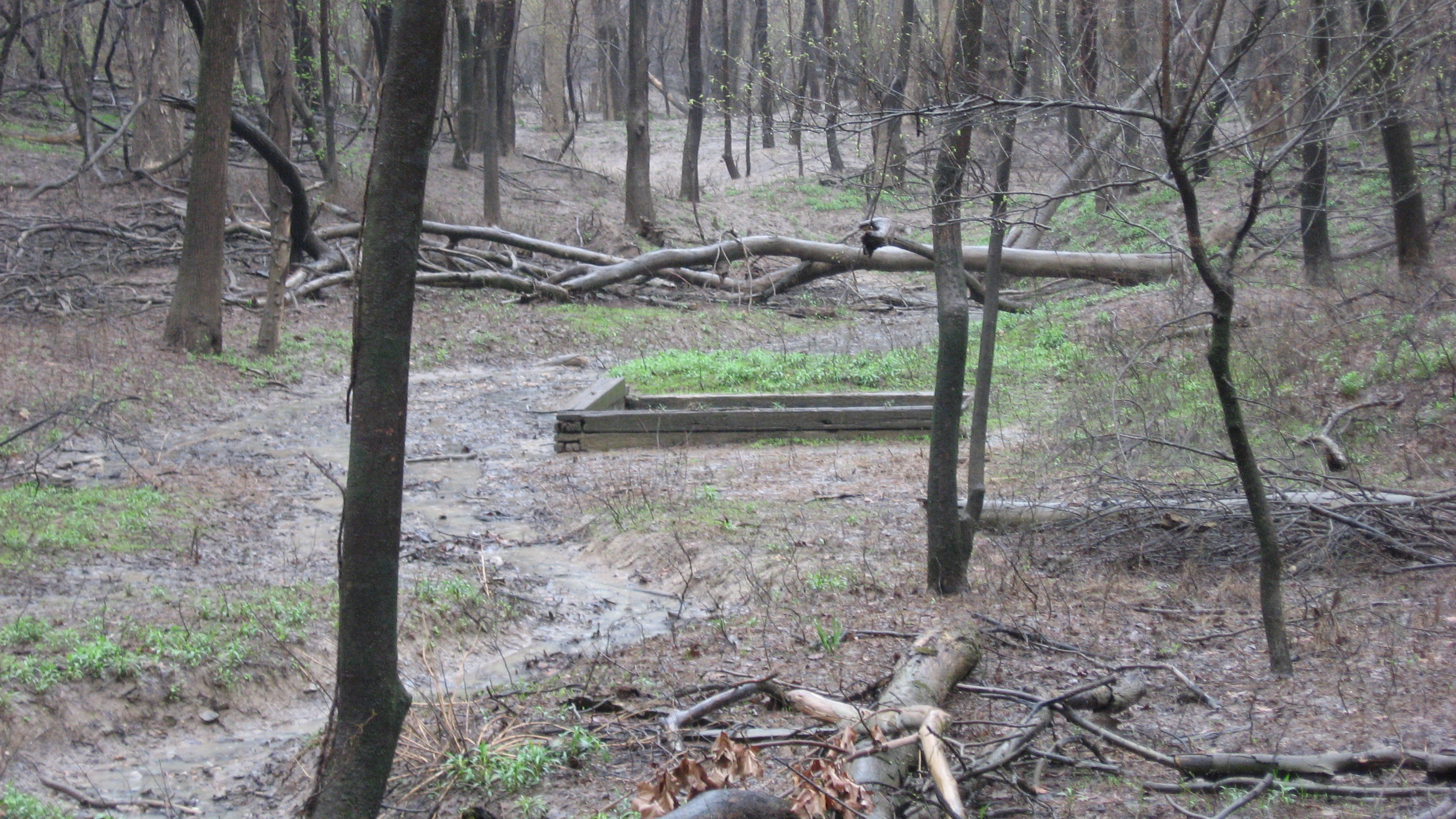
- Illinois Salines in 2013

- Location within Illinois Location within the United States
- Nearest city: Equality, Illinois
- Coordinates: 37°42′18″N 88°17′43″W
- Area: 306 acres (124 ha)
- NRHP reference No.: 73000702
- Added to NRHP: May 24, 1973

The Illinois Salines, also known as the Saline Springs or Great Salt Springs, is a salt spring site located along the Saline River in Gallatin County, Illinois. The site was a source of salt for Illinois' prehistoric settlers and is now an archaeological site with a large quantity of organic remains. After European settlement of Illinois, the salt springs became part of Illinois' first major industry and were one of the only places in Illinois where slavery was legal after 1818.

== Prehistory ==
The Illinois Salines were an important source of salt for prehistoric residents of Illinois. The earliest occupation of the site is speculated to have occurred during the Early Woodland Period; the site continued to be occupied through the Mississippian period. The salt excavated from the site was traded to other prehistoric sites in Illinois, as evidenced by the recovery of items from the Saline Springs at the Kincaid Site at the southern tip of Illinois. The Saline Springs are also an important site of prehistoric remains such as shells, bones, and other organic materials. Excavations at the site began in the mid-1800s and have continued through the 20th century. An archaeological project led by Southern Illinois University has studied the site since 1981.

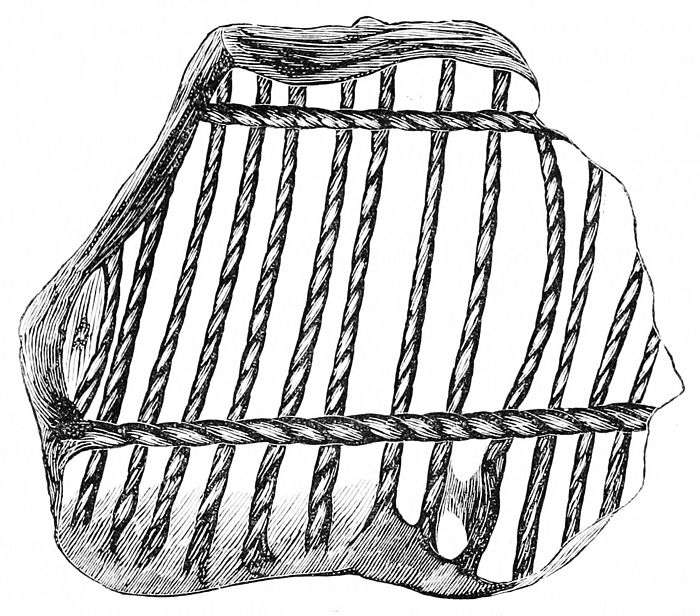
Pottery shard found at Salt Springs showing impression of woven basket

Shards of pottery made by historical Indigenous peoples of the area have been found that had been made by moulding clay inside baskets before firing. This resulted in producing vessels that were as large as four feet across with impressions of the woven baskets on the outer surface of the pots.

== Modern history ==
The southern Illinois salines were the first major industry in the Illinois Territory following European settlement. The salines, where brine was boiled down into salt, were financially successful, and became the property of the State of Illinois upon its statehood in 1818. Although Illinois was legally a free state, an exemption in the Illinois Constitution allowed slavery at the Illinois Salines and other salt springs near Shawneetown; this exception was made because the slave-operated salines contributed one-third of the new state's yearly revenue. The law allowed African slaves to be imported to the site until 1825, when the exemption expired. However, indentured servitude at the springs continued past this point. Salt production continued until 1870, when competition from West Virginia salt mines drove the springs out of business.

The site was added to the National Register of Historic Places on May 24, 1973.

== Notable people ==
- John Crenshaw
- John Duff (counterfeiter)
- James Ford (pirate)
