= Gallatin County, Illinois =

County in Illinois, United States

- County
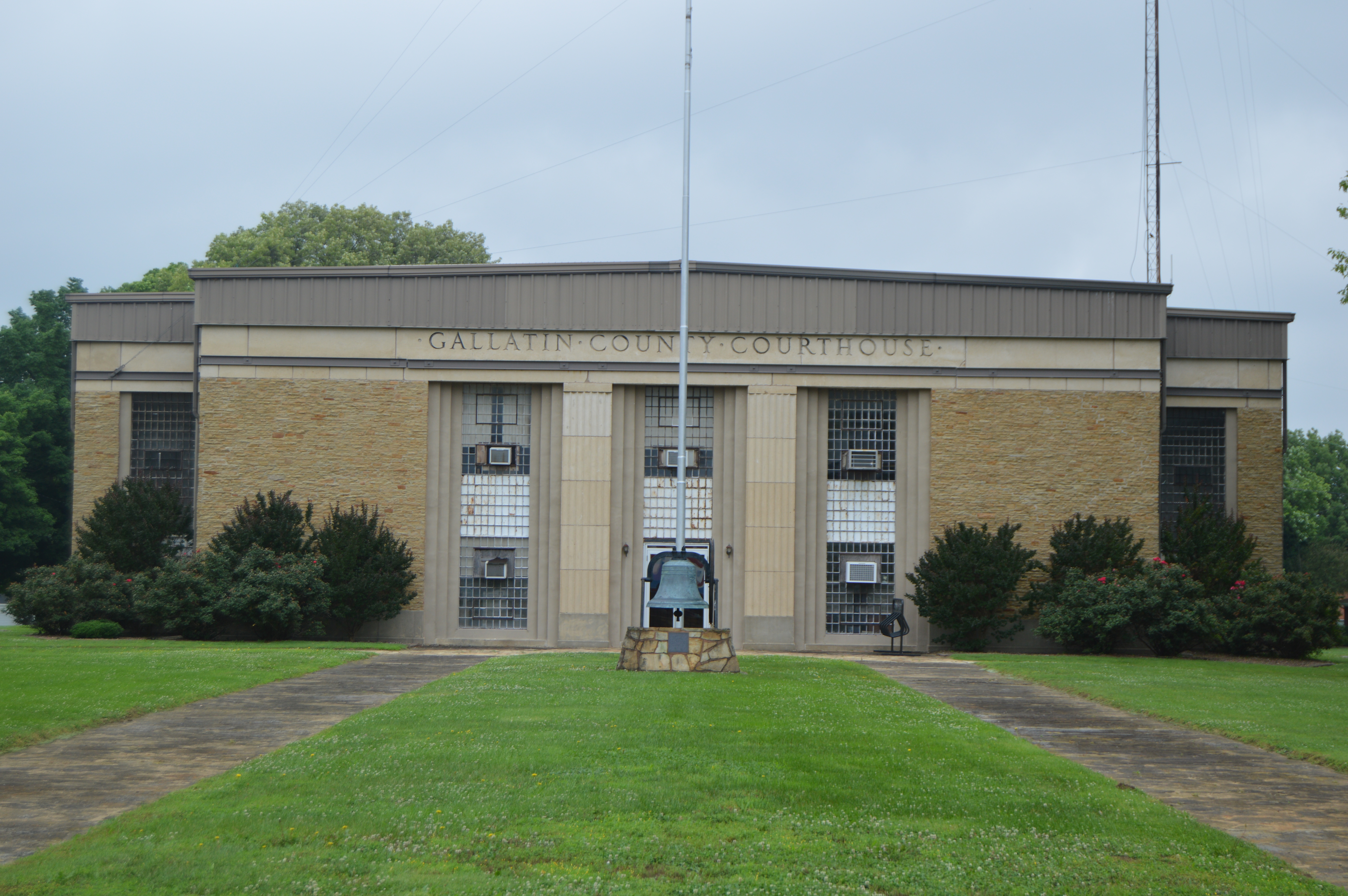
- Gallatin County Courthouse in Shawneetown

- Location within the U.S. state of Illinois
- Coordinates: 37°46′N 88°14′W
- Country: United States
- State: Illinois
- Founded: 1812
- Named for: Albert Gallatin
- Seat: Shawneetown
- Largest city: Shawneetown

Area
  - Total: 328 sq mi (850 km^{2})
  - Land: 323 sq mi (840 km^{2})
  - Water: 5.1 sq mi (13 km^{2}) 1.6%

Population (2020)
  - Total: 4,946
  - Estimate (2025): 4,616 ▼
  - Density: 15.3/sq mi (5.91/km^{2})
- Time zone: UTC−6 (Central)
  - Summer (DST): UTC−5 (CDT)
- Congressional district: 12th
- Website: https://gallatinco.illinois.gov/

Gallatin County is a county located in the U.S. state of Illinois. According to the 2020 census, it has a population of 4,946, making it the third-least populous county in Illinois. Its county seat is Shawneetown. It is located in the southern portion of Illinois known locally as Little Egypt. Located at the mouth of the Wabash River, Gallatin County, along with neighboring Posey County, Indiana, and Union County, Kentucky form the tri-point of the Illinois–Indiana–Kentucky tri-state area.

== History ==
Salt production served as the state's first major industry in the early 19th century. Saltworks developed first by Native Americans, and the French had settled at the Great Salt Spring on the south side of the Saline River, about five miles downstream from Equality. Beginning in 1803, salt works were also developed at Half Moon Lick, southwest of Equality on the north side of the Saline River. Half Moon Lick is now on private land, but the Great Salt Springs are on public lands in the Shawnee National Forest, about one mile west of the Saline River bridge across Illinois Route 1 on Salt Well Road.

Gallatin County was organized in 1812 from land formerly in Randolph County. It was named for Albert Gallatin, who was then Secretary of the Treasury. The bank at Shawneetown was the first in Illinois. It was originally in the John Marshall House, which has been rebuilt and serves as the museum of the Gallatin County Historical Society. This should not be confused with the State Bank of Illinois building, which is a state historic site a block away in Old Shawneetown.

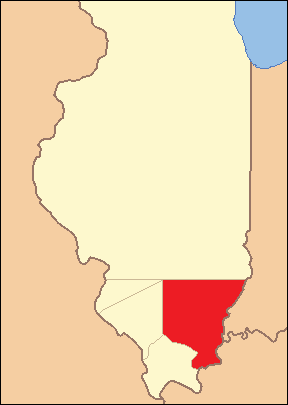
Gallatin County created in the Illinois Territory period between 1812 and 1815

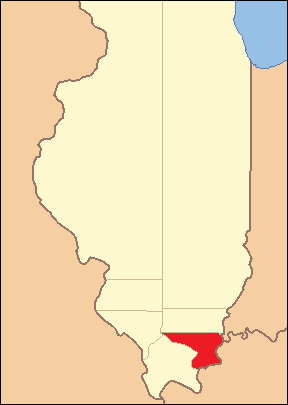
Gallatin between 1815 and 1816

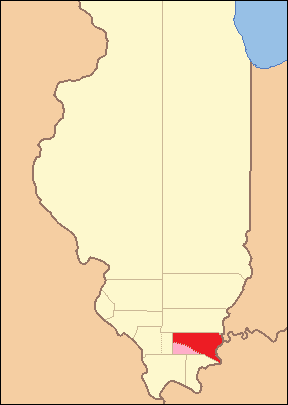
Gallatin between 1816 and 1818, including unorganized territory (formerly part of Johnson County) temporarily attached to it.

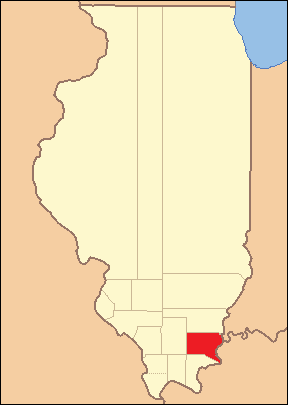
Gallatin between 1818 and 1847

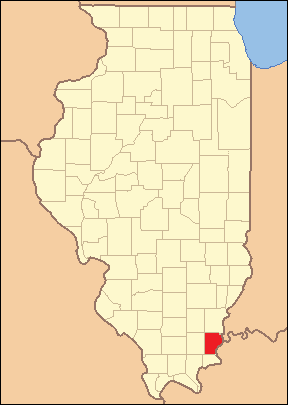
Gallatin in 1847, when a cession to Hardin and the creation of Saline County reduced it to its current territory

== Politics ==
Although Illinois was legally a free state, an exemption in the Illinois Constitution allowed slavery at the Illinois Salines and other salt springs near Shawneetown in Gallatin County. The slave-operated salines contributed one-third of the new state's yearly revenue. The law allowed African slaves to be imported to the site until 1825, when the exemption expired. However, indentured servitude at the springs continued past this point. Salt production continued until 1870, when competition from West Virginia salt mines drove the springs out of business.

As the most culturally Southern of all Illinois counties, Gallatin County was pro-Confederate during the Civil War and even provided a few volunteers to the Confederate Army. It then became solidly Democratic for the next century and a third, voting Republican only in the GOP landslides of 1920, 1952, 1972 and 1980. Even in those four elections, no Republican candidate received more than Richard Nixon’s 53.7 percent in his 3,000-plus-county 1972 triumph.

Since 2000, Gallatin County has followed the same political trajectory as Tennessee, Missouri, Kentucky, West Virginia and Appalachian regions of adjacent states, whereby the Democratic Party’s liberal views on social issues have produced dramatic swings to the Republican Party amongst its almost entirely Southern white population. Over the five elections from 2000 to 2016, Gallatin County has seen a swing of 84 percentage points to the Republican Party – an average of 17 percentage points per election – so that Hillary Clinton’s 24.3 percent vote share in 2016 is barely half the worst Democratic percentage from before 2010. However, despite its sharp rightward turn, it followed the wave in 2008 within the state that elected Barack Obama president, who remains the last Democrat to win the county in a presidential election. Meanwhile, U.S. Senator Tammy Duckworth remains the last Democrat to win it in any federal election, having done so in 2016, while Jesse White remains the last Democrat to win it in any statewide election, doing so in 2018.

In 1994, Gallatin County was the only one in the state to vote for the Democratic candidate for governor. It voted for the Democrat in every gubernatorial election from 1924 to 2006, finally flipping in 2010 and then voting Republican again in 2014 and 2018.

United States presidential election results for Gallatin County, Illinois
Year	Republican		Democratic		Third party(ies)	
Year	No.	%	No.	%	No.	%
1892	1,211	38.35%	1,675	53.04%	272	8.61%
1896	1,468	41.02%	2,067	57.75%	44	1.23%
1900	1,432	40.94%	2,004	57.29%	62	1.77%
1904	1,401	44.70%	1,540	49.14%	193	6.16%
1908	1,411	41.77%	1,845	54.62%	122	3.61%
1912	1,051	33.78%	1,697	54.55%	363	11.67%
1916	1,985	39.03%	2,920	57.41%	181	3.56%
1920	2,184	49.94%	2,000	45.74%	189	4.32%
1924	1,792	39.16%	2,385	52.12%	399	8.72%
1928	2,002	45.78%	2,343	53.58%	28	0.64%
1932	1,279	26.57%	3,469	72.08%	65	1.35%
1936	2,004	34.71%	3,701	64.10%	69	1.20%
1940	2,588	43.65%	3,293	55.54%	48	0.81%
1944	2,073	48.27%	2,175	50.64%	47	1.09%
1948	1,789	42.60%	2,385	56.79%	26	0.62%
1952	2,300	51.56%	2,153	48.26%	8	0.18%
1956	2,179	49.35%	2,230	50.51%	6	0.14%
1960	2,179	47.68%	2,386	52.21%	5	0.11%
1964	1,394	32.89%	2,845	67.11%	0	0.00%
1968	1,802	43.01%	1,980	47.26%	408	9.74%
1972	2,148	53.69%	1,844	46.09%	9	0.22%
1976	1,499	36.36%	2,611	63.33%	13	0.32%
1980	1,700	50.21%	1,678	49.56%	8	0.24%
1984	1,939	47.15%	2,164	52.63%	9	0.22%
1988	1,580	38.89%	2,455	60.42%	28	0.69%
1992	990	25.10%	2,371	60.12%	583	14.78%
1996	856	24.37%	2,113	60.15%	544	15.49%
2000	1,591	44.72%	1,878	52.78%	89	2.50%
2004	1,619	50.20%	1,573	48.78%	33	1.02%
2008	1,212	42.20%	1,587	55.26%	73	2.54%
2012	1,492	57.99%	1,029	39.99%	52	2.02%
2016	1,942	71.74%	657	24.27%	108	3.99%
2020	2,019	75.48%	622	23.25%	34	1.27%
2024	1,923	75.86%	561	22.13%	51	2.01%

== Geography ==
According to the U.S. Census Bureau, the county has a total area of 328 square miles (850 km^{2}), of which 323 square miles (840 km^{2}) is land and 5.1 square miles (13 km^{2}) (1.6%) is water.

The Wabash and Ohio rivers join in the northeastern part of the county. The Saline River is a major drainage in the county, and it feeds into the Ohio River.

=== Climate and weather ===
Shawneetown, Illinois

Climate chart (precipitation, max. and min. temperature)
J	F	M	A	M	J	J	A	S	O	N	D
3.5 41 21	3.7 47 24	4.7 57 33	4.8 68 42	5 76 52	4.2 84 60	4.2 87 65	3.5 87 63	3.2 80 55	3.2 70 43	4.4 57 34	4.3 46 25
- █ Average max. and min. temperatures in °F
- █ Precipitation totals in inches
- Source: The Weather Channel
Metric conversion
J	F	M	A	M	J	J	A	S	O	N	D
88 5 −6	93 8 −4	120 14 1	121 20 6	128 24 11	106 29 16	107 31 18	89 31 17	82 27 13	82 21 6	112 14 1	109 8 −4
- █ Average max. and min. temperatures in °C
- █ Precipitation totals in mm

In recent years, average temperatures in the county seat of Shawneetown have ranged from a low of 21 °F (−6 °C) in January to a high of 87 °F (31 °C) in July, although a record low of −22 °F (−30 °C) was recorded in January 1994 and a record high of 104 °F (40 °C) was recorded in August 2007. Average monthly precipitation ranged from 3.22 inches (82 mm) in October to 5.02 inches (128 mm) in May.

=== Transit ===
- Rides Mass Transit District

=== Major highways ===
- U.S. Highway 45
- Illinois Route 1
- Illinois Route 13
- Illinois Route 141
- Illinois Route 142

=== Adjacent counties ===
- White County - north
- Posey County, Indiana - northeast
- Union County, Kentucky - east
- Hardin County - south
- Saline County - west
- Hamilton County - northwest

=== National protected area ===
- Shawnee National Forest (part)

== Demographics ==
Historical population
Census	Pop.	Note	%±
1820	3,155		—
1830	7,405		134.7%
1840	10,760		45.3%
1850	5,448		−49.4%
1860	8,055		47.9%
1870	11,134		38.2%
1880	12,861		15.5%
1890	14,935		16.1%
1900	15,836		6.0%
1910	14,628		−7.6%
1920	12,856		−12.1%
1930	10,091		−21.5%
1940	11,414		13.1%
1950	9,818		−14.0%
1960	7,638		−22.2%
1970	7,418		−2.9%
1980	7,590		2.3%
1990	6,909		−9.0%
2000	6,445		−6.7%
2010	5,589		−13.3%
2020	4,946		−11.5%
2025 (est.)	4,616	▼	−6.7%
U.S. Decennial Census; 1790-1960 1900-1990; 1990-2000 2010-2017

2000 census age pyramid for Gallatin County

=== 2020 census ===
As of the 2020 census, the county had a population of 4,946, a median age of 47.3 years, 20.5% of residents were under the age of 18, and 24.7% were 65 years of age or older. For every 100 females there were 95.0 males, and for every 100 females age 18 and over there were 93.9 males age 18 and over.

The racial makeup of the county was 95.0% White, 0.5% Black or African American, 0.1% American Indian and Alaska Native, 0.5% Asian, <0.1% Native Hawaiian and Pacific Islander, 0.4% from some other race, and 3.4% from two or more races. Hispanic or Latino residents of any race comprised 1.1% of the population.

<0.1% of residents lived in urban areas, while 100.0% lived in rural areas.

There were 2,150 households in the county, of which 26.1% had children under the age of 18 living in them. Of all households, 48.1% were married-couple households, 20.6% were households with a male householder and no spouse or partner present, and 26.9% were households with a female householder and no spouse or partner present. About 33.5% of all households were made up of individuals and 18.2% had someone living alone who was 65 years of age or older.

There were 2,497 housing units, of which 13.9% were vacant. Among occupied housing units, 79.6% were owner-occupied and 20.4% were renter-occupied. The homeowner vacancy rate was 1.6% and the rental vacancy rate was 11.8%.

In terms of ancestry, 18.1% were German, 13.6% were Irish, and 14% were English.

The median income for a household in the county was $51,868 and the median income for a family was $65,833.

=== Racial and ethnic composition ===
Gallatin County, Illinois – Racial and ethnic composition Note: the US Census treats Hispanic/Latino as an ethnic category. This table excludes Latinos from the racial categories and assigns them to a separate category. Hispanics/Latinos may be of any race.
Race / Ethnicity (NH = Non-Hispanic)	Pop 1980	Pop 1990	Pop 2000	Pop 2010	Pop 2020	% 1980	% 1990	% 2000	% 2010	% 2020
White alone (NH)	7,504	6,830	6,308	5,427	4,683	98.87%	98.86%	97.87%	97.10%	94.68%
Black or African American alone (NH)	28	42	16	12	25	0.37%	0.61%	0.25%	0.21%	0.51%
Native American or Alaska Native alone (NH)	6	10	30	14	5	0.08%	0.14%	0.47%	0.25%	0.10%
Asian alone (NH)	5	11	4	5	23	0.07%	0.16%	0.06%	0.09%	0.47%
Native Hawaiian or Pacific Islander alone (NH)	x	x	2	0	0	x	x	0.03%	0.00%	0.00%
Other race alone (NH)	2	0	0	1	3	0.03%	0.00%	0.00%	0.02%	0.06%
Mixed race or Multiracial (NH)	x	x	29	64	154	x	x	0.45%	1.15%	3.11%
Hispanic or Latino (any race)	45	16	56	66	53	0.59%	0.23%	0.87%	1.18%	1.07%
Total	7,590	6,909	6,445	5,589	4,946	100.00%	100.00%	100.00%	100.00%	100.00%

== Communities ==
=== City ===
- Shawneetown

=== Villages ===
- Equality
- Junction
- New Haven
- Old Shawneetown
- Omaha
- Ridgway

=== Unincorporated communities ===
- Cottonwood
- Elba
- Kedron
- Lawler

=== Townships ===
- Asbury
- Bowlesville
- Eagle Creek
- Equality
- Gold Hill
- New Haven
- North Fork
- Omaha
- Ridgway
- Shawnee

== See also ==
- National Register of Historic Places listings in Gallatin County, Illinois

== See also ==
- Gallatin Community Unit School District 7
