= Saline River (Illinois) =

River in Illinois, United States

Coordinates: 37°34′15″N 88°7′32″W

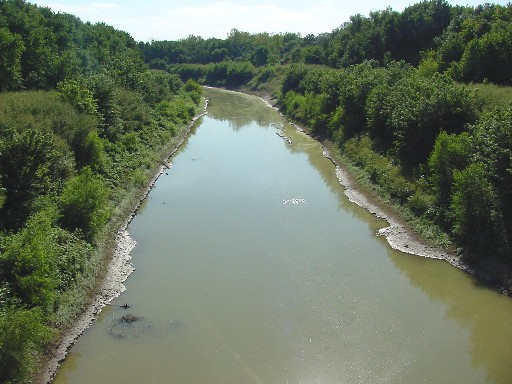
- The Saline River.

Location
- Country: United States
- State: Illinois

Physical characteristics
- Source: Brushy Creek (Saline River)
  - location: Williamson County, Illinois, United States
  - elevation: 351 ft (107 m)
- Mouth: Ohio River
  - location: Saline Landing, Illinois, United States
  - elevation: 200 ft (61 m)
- Basin size: 1,762 mi^{2} (4,560 km^{2})

The Saline River is a tributary of the Ohio River, approximately 27 miles (43 km) long, in the Southern Illinois region of the U.S. state of Illinois. The river drains a large section of southeast Illinois, with a drainage basin of 1,762 square miles (4,564 km^{2}). The major tributaries include the South Fork, Middle Fork and North Fork, all lying within the Saline Valley. The once meandering swampy river was important among Native Americans and early settlers as a source of salt from numerous salt springs where it was commercially extracted in the early 19th century.

== History ==
From 1807 to 1818, Illinois paid the United States Treasury $28,160.25 in revenue. During the same time, Ohio paid $240 and Indiana, Kentucky and Missouri paid nothing. One third of the State of Illinois revenue came from the salt industry coming from African American slaves working on the Saline River in 1818. The last concessionaire of the Saline Springs was John Crenshaw, then owner of what became known as the Old Slave House.

During the late 18th century, the river had heavy barge traffic. It was navigable for keel boats and batteaux for 30 miles (48 km) inland from the mouth at the Ohio River. The farthest point west that could still accommodate flat boats and barges is the largest city on the river Harrisburg, Illinois, but the river has not been used for navigation in almost a century. It is today used mainly as an oversized drainage ditch of little interest except for flood control.

Bidding for straightening and dredging began in 1930.

On June 18, 1888, an act of January 25, 1849, declaring the Saline River to be navigable, was repealed by the Illinois General Assembly. The river was deemed "impractical" for navigation due to the "anxiousness" of County residents to build bridges across it.

== Watershed ==
The main stem of the Saline River is 26.9 miles (43.3 km) long and drains 1,128,300 acres (4,566 km^{2}). The river is formed by the confluence of the South Fork and the Middle Fork east of Harrisburg. The South Fork is 49.2 miles (79.2 km) long and rises in northern Johnson County within the Lake of Egypt reservoir. The Middle Fork is 24.9 miles (40.1 km) long and rises in southwestern Hamilton County. The North Fork of the Saline River is 33.7 miles (54.2 km) long and joins the main stem east of Equality, having risen in central Hamilton County southeast of McLeansboro.

In 1995, stream quality was rated as "Fair" to "Good". Causes of pollution include inorganics, nutrients, siltation, organic enrichment (low dissolved oxygen) and other habitat alterations attributed to agricultural runoff, hydrologic/habitat modification and resource extraction. The North and Middle forks of the Saline River system have a degraded Indiana crayfish population due to threats to water quality from pollution, coal mining, oil extraction, siltation, stream channelization. and clearing.

The Saline River watershed is located in southern Illinois and flows in an easterly direction encompassing over 754,942 acres (3,055.14 km^{2}). The watershed covers land within Hamilton, White, Franklin, Williamson, Gallatin, Johnson, Pope, Hardin, and Saline Counties. The mainly agricultural landscape has many small streams, creeks, and man-made lakes that flow into the Saline River which eventually enters the Ohio River where it is 450 feet (140 m) wide. The Lake of Egypt, an impoundment on the upper end of the South Fork Saline River, is the largest lake in the watershed, and covers 2,300 acres (9.3 km^{2}).

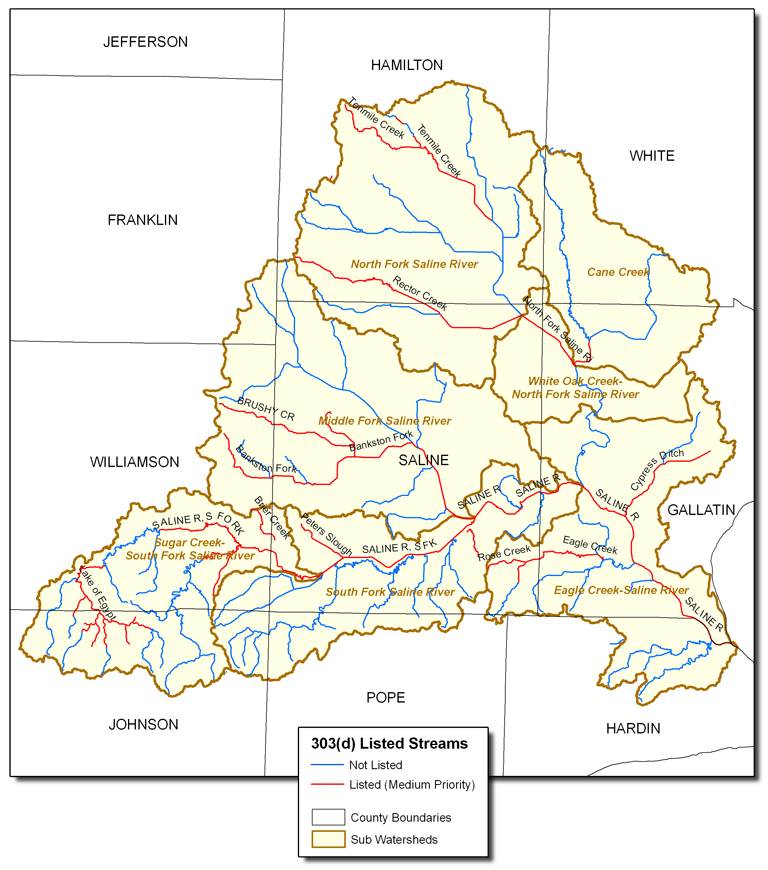
Detailed watershed map.

The population of the watershed is mostly rural, but there are many small cities and villages found throughout the area then passes through the eastern section of the Shawnee National Forest. The largest population centers are the cities of Harrisburg (pop. 9,628), Eldorado (pop. 4,416), McLeansboro (pop. 2,945), and Carrier Mills (pop. 1,886). Agriculture, mining, and manufacturing are the major components of the regional economy. The cities of Equality and Harrisburg, Illinois were built on sandstone bluffs overlooking the Saline River Middle Fork Valley.

== Cities and counties ==
The following cities and towns are drained by the Saline River:

South Fork

- Carrier Mills
- Goreville
- Lakeview
- Stonefort
- New Burnside

Middle Fork

- Eldorado
- Equality
- Galatia
- Harrisburg
- Raleigh

North Fork

- McLeansboro
- Norris City

The watershed includes all or part of the following counties:

- Franklin County
- Hardin County
- Johnson County
- Saline County
- White County
- Hamilton County
- Williamson County
- Gallatin County
- Pope County

== See also ==
- List of rivers of Illinois
- Tuttle Bottoms Monster
- Watersheds of Illinois
