= Sudan (disambiguation) =

Sudan is a country in north-east Africa.

Sudan may also refer to:

== Places ==
=== Related to Sudan ===
- Sudanian savanna, a belt of tropical savanna across the African continent
- French Sudan, a former French colony, present-day Mali and other West African countries
  - Turco-Egyptian Sudan (1821–1885)
  - Mahdist Sudan (1885–1899)
  - Anglo-Egyptian Sudan (1899–1956)
  - Republic of the Sudan (1956–1969)
  - Democratic Republic of the Sudan (1969–1985)
  - Republic of Sudan (1985–2019)
  - South Sudan, a separate country, which declared independence from Sudan in 2011

=== Elsewhere ===
- Sudan, Iran, a village in Khuzestan Province, Iran
- Sudan, Texas, a small town in Lamb County of West Texas in the United States
- Sudan (Ibb), a sub-district of Ibb Governorate, Yemen
- Sudan, Zira, a village in Punjab, India

== People ==
- Madhusudan (disambiguation), the generic Indian name
- Sūdan, court poet
- Sudan Gurung (born 1987), Nepalese politician
- Gabriel Sudan (1899–1977), Romanian mathematician
- Madhu Sudan (born 1966), Indian computer scientist

== Other uses ==
- Sudan (beverage), a traditional Korean punch
- Sudan (film), a 1945 historical drama
- Sudan (rhinoceros) (1973–2018), a northern white rhinoceros at the Ol Pejeta Conservancy in Kenya
- Sudan (ship), the PS Sudan, a Nile steamer
- Sudan (tribe), a settled Bedouin tribe of the United Arab Emirates
- Sudan function, in mathematics, named after Gabriel Sudan
- Sudan grass, a grass
- Sudan stain, a group of synthetic organic compounds used as dyes for plastics and biological samples

== See also ==
- SUDAAN, statistical software
- Soudan (disambiguation)
- Southern Sudan (disambiguation)
- Nubia (disambiguation), including Nubia regions similar to modern Republic of Sudan
- Nuba (disambiguation), including Nuba regions similar to modern Republic of Sudan
- Kush (disambiguation), including Kush regions similar to modern Republic of Sudan
