= Ridgeway (surname) =

Ridgeway is an English surname.

== People ==
- Aden Ridgeway (born 1962), Australian politician
- Brian Ridgeway (born 1984), Canadian football player
- C. W. Ridgeway, American football coach in the United States
- Charles Ridgeway DD (1841–1927), the Bishop of Chichester from 1908 to 1919
- Dante Ridgeway (born 1984), former American football wide receiver
- Elizabeth Ridgeway (died 1684), English woman convicted of poisoning her husband
- Fred Ridgeway (1953–2012), Irish-born stage and television actor
- Frederick Ridgeway (1848–1921), Anglican bishop from 1901 until his death 20 years later
- Fritzi Ridgeway (1898–1961), American actress of the silent era
- Greg Ridgeway (born 1973), American criminologist
- Hassan Ridgeway (born 1994), American football defensive tackle
- James Ridgeway (1936–2021), American investigative journalist
- Jessica Ridgeway (2002–2012), American murder victim
- Joseph West Ridgeway GCB GCMG KCSI PC (1844–1930), British civil servant and colonial governor
- Luann Ridgeway (born 1956), citizen-legislator and an attorney
- Marian Elizabeth Ridgeway (died 1982), American political scientist
- Matthew B. Ridgeway (1895–1993), US general
- Peter Ridgeway, Australian prosecutor and a former deputy director of Prosecutions in Fiji
- Colonel Richard Kirby Ridgeway VC, CB (1848–1924), Irish officer in the British Army, who received the Victoria Cross
- Rick Ridgeway (born 1949), mountaineer, adventurer, environmentalist, writer, filmmaker and businessman
- Suzanne Ridgeway (1918–1996), American film actress
- Thomas Ridgeway, multiple people
- William Ridgeway (1853–1926), British archaeologist and philologist
- William Ridgeway (law reporter) (1765–1817), Irish barrister and law reporter

== Fictional characters ==
- Jordan Ridgeway, fictional character on the NBC daytime soap opera Days of Our Lives
- Paula Ridgeway, key character in Random Harvest by James Hilton
- Ridgeway, key character in The Underground Railroad by Colson Whitehead
- Linnet Doyle née Ridgeway, a character in Agatha Christie's novel Death on the Nile

== See also ==
- Ridgeway (disambiguation)
- Bridgeway (disambiguation)
- Ridgway (name)
