= Ridgway (name) =

Ridgway is both a given name and an English surname. Notable people with the name include:

- Ridgway Robert Syers Christian Codner Lloyd (1842–1884), English physician and antiquary

Surname

- Charles Ridgway (1878–1946), American composer
- Charles Ridgway (1884–1942), Australian comedian, known as Charlie Vaude
- Dave Ridgway (born 1959), British-Canadian football player
- Eldo T. Ridgway (1880–1955), American politician and physician
- Ellen Richards Ridgway (1866–1934), American golfer
- Emma Ridgway (1903–1981), American politician
- Fred Ridgway (1923–2015), English cricketer
- Gary Ridgway (born 1949), American serial killer known as the Green River Killer
- Jacob Ridgway (1768–1845), American merchant and diplomat
- Jesse Ridgway (born 1992) American YouTuber
- John Ridgway (comic artist) (born 1940), British comics artist
- John Ridgway (sailor) (born 1938), British sailor
- John Livzey Ridgway (1859–1947), American scientific illustrator
- Keith Ridgway (born 1965), Irish author
- Linda Ridgway (born 1947), American artist
- Matthew Ridgway (1895–1993), American military general
- Peter Ridgway (pentathlete) (born 1949), American pentathlete
- Robert Ridgway (1850–1929), American ornithologist
- Robert Ridgway (congressman) (1823–1870), American congressman from Virginia
- Stan Ridgway (born 1954), American musician
- Thomas Ridgway (tea trader) (19th century), British trader
- Thomas S. Ridgway (1826–1897), American politician and businessman

== See also ==
- Ridgeway (surname)
