= Robert Ridgway (disambiguation) =

Robert Ridgway (1850–1929) was an ornithologist.

Robert Ridgway or Ridgeway may also refer to:

- Robert Ridgway (congressman) (1823–1870), Virginia congressman, lawyer and editor
- Robert Ridgway (engineer) (1862–1938), American civil engineer
- Robert Ridgeway, 2nd Earl of Londonderry (died 1641)
- Robert Ridgeway, 4th Earl of Londonderry (died 1714), Anglo-Irish peer
- Robert L. Ridgeway III, American politician, member of the South Carolina House of Representatives

== See also ==
- Ridgway (disambiguation)
