= Ridgway =

Ridgway may refer to:

== Places in the United States ==
- Ridgway, Colorado
  - Ridgway State Park
  - Ridgway Dam
  - Mount Ridgway
- Ridgway, Illinois
- Ridgway, Pennsylvania
- Ridgway Township (disambiguation)

== Other uses ==
- Ridgway (name)
- Ridgway Potteries, British pottery company established 1794
- Ridgway Dynamo & Engine Co, U.S. engineering company

== See also ==
- Ridgeway (disambiguation)
