= John Ridgway =

John Ridgway or Ridgeway may refer to:

- John L. Ridgway (1859–1947), American nature artist and brother of ornithologist Robert Ridgway
- John Ridgway (comics) (born 1940), British comic artist
- John Ridgway (sailor) (born 1938), British sailor and ocean rower
- John Ridgeway (died 1560), MP for Dartmouth and Exeter
- John Ridgeway III (born 1999), American football player
