= Winter Palace Hotel =

Hotel in Luxor, Egypt

Coordinates: 25.6969°N 32.6365°E

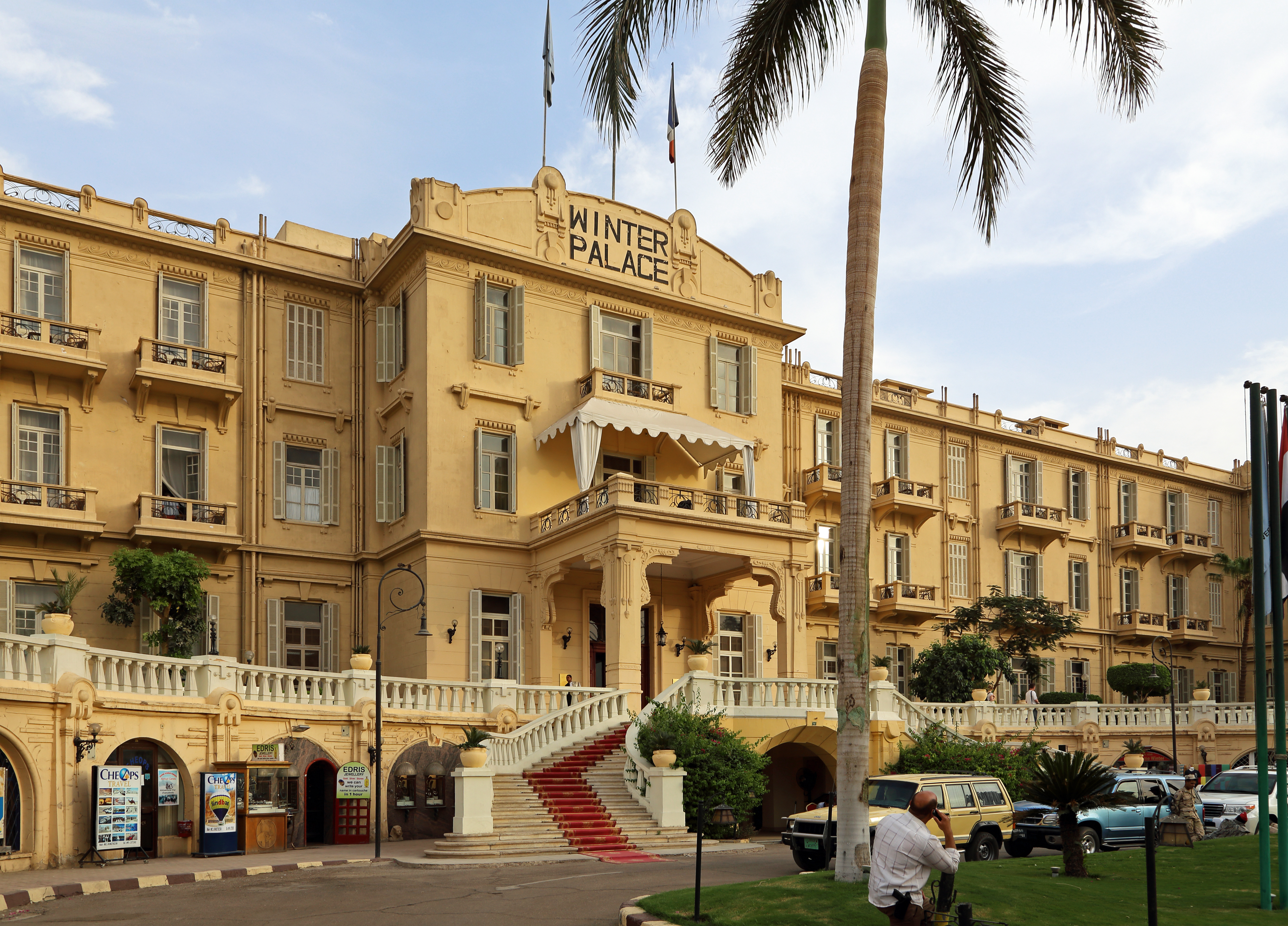

General information
- Owner: Legacy Hotels

The Winter Palace Hotel, also known as the Old Winter Palace Hotel, is a historic British colonial-era 5-star luxury resort hotel located on the banks of the River Nile in Luxor, Egypt, just south of Luxor Temple, with 86 rooms and 6 suites.

For decades, the hotel was managed by Accor under their luxury Sofitel brand. In early 2026, Mandarin Oriental assumed management of the hotel, which closed for renovations with plans to reopen in July 2027 as Mandarin Oriental Winter Palace, Luxor.

== History ==
The hotel was built by Benjamin Herbst in the Upper Egypt Hotels Co, an enterprise founded in 1905 by Cairo hoteliers Charles Baehler and George Nungovich in collaboration with Thomas Cook & Son (Egypt). It was inaugurated on Saturday 19 January 1907, with a picnic at the Valley of the Kings followed by dinner at the hotel and speeches.

The architect was Leon Stienon, the Italian construction company G.GAROZZO & Figli Costruzioni in Cemento Armato, Sistema SIACCI brevettato.

During World War I, the hotel was temporarily closed to paying guests and employed as a hospice for convalescing soldiers. A regular guest at the hotel from 1907 on was George Herbert, 5th Earl of Carnarvon, better known simply as Lord Carnarvon. Carnarvon was the patron of Egyptologist Howard Carter, who in 1922 discovered the intact tomb of Tutankhamun. After the discovery was announced the Winter Palace played host to the international press corps and foreign visitors there to follow the story. Carter used the hotel's noticeboard to deliver occasional news and information on the discovery.

In 1963 the complex was expanded with the construction of the New Winter Palace. The addition, classified as a 3-star hotel, was joined by corridors to the original. It was demolished in 2008.

In 1996, the Pavillon, a 4-star annex with 116 rooms, was built in the rear garden of the Winter Palace, close to the swimming pool. The Pavillon shares many amenities with the Winter Palace, including the gardens, pools, tennis courts, terraces and restaurants.

The hotel is owned by the Egyptian General Company for Tourism & Hotels ("EGOTH") of Egypt. It was managed for many years by French hotel companyAccor. The Winter Palace wing was operated first as part of their Pullman Hotels division, and later as part of their Sofitel division as Sofitel Winter Palace Luxor, while the Pavillon wing was operated by Accor without branding as the Pavilion Winter Luxor Hotel. In 20 December 2023, Icon Company, a subsidiary of Talaat Moustafa Group, acquired 51% of Legacy Hotels Company, which owns the hotel.

In early 2026, Mandarin Oriental Hotel Group assumed management of the Winter Palace Hotel and Old Cataract Hotel in Aswan. The Winter Palace closed for renovations and will reopen in July 2027 as Mandarin Oriental Winter Palace, Luxor.

== Facilities ==
The Winter Palace has 5 restaurants. The 1886 Restaurant (French cuisine), and the la Corniche Restaurant (international cuisine), are both located in the historic Palace wing. The Bougainvilliers (international cuisine) is in the Pavilion wing, while the Palmetto (Italian cuisine and snacks) and the El Tarboush (Egyptian cuisine) are in the garden close to the swimming pool.

== Notable residents ==
- George Herbert, 5th Earl of Carnarvon, a collector of Egyptian antiquities who financed archaeologist and Egyptologist Howard Carter's discovery of Tutankhamun's tomb in 1922, stayed many times at the Winter Palace.
- Albert I (1875–1934), King of the Belgians and his wife Elisabeth (1876–1965), Duchess in Bavaria, Queen of the Belgians, stayed many times at the Winter Palace.

== In popular culture ==
In 2004, it was used as a filming location for Death on the Nile, an episode of the popular ITV TV series Agatha Christie's Poirot.

== Gallery ==
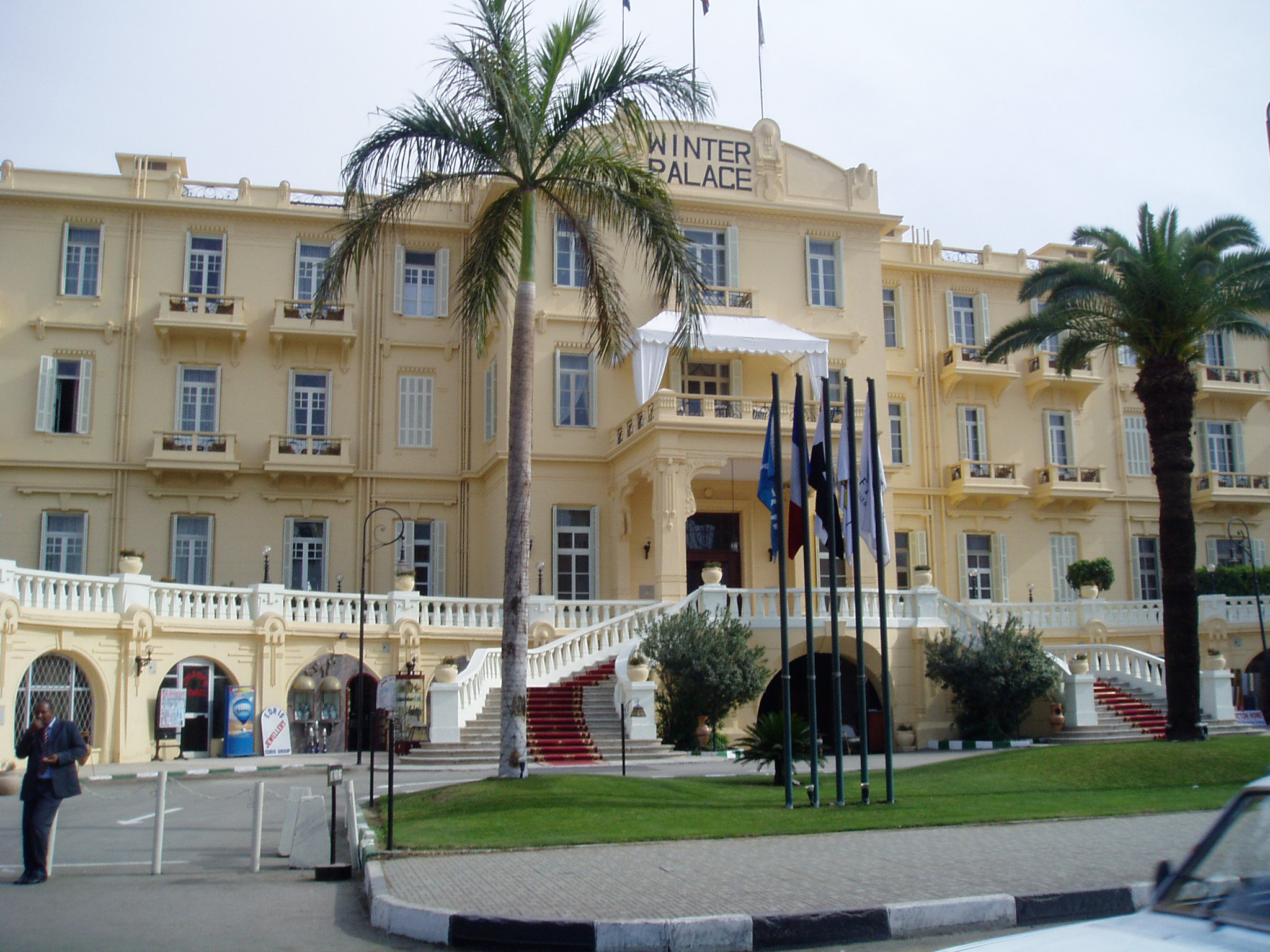
Winter Palace Hotel

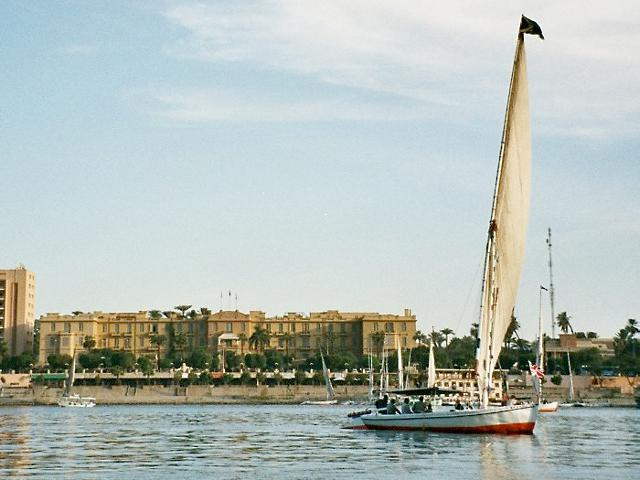
Winter Palace Hotel from The Nile

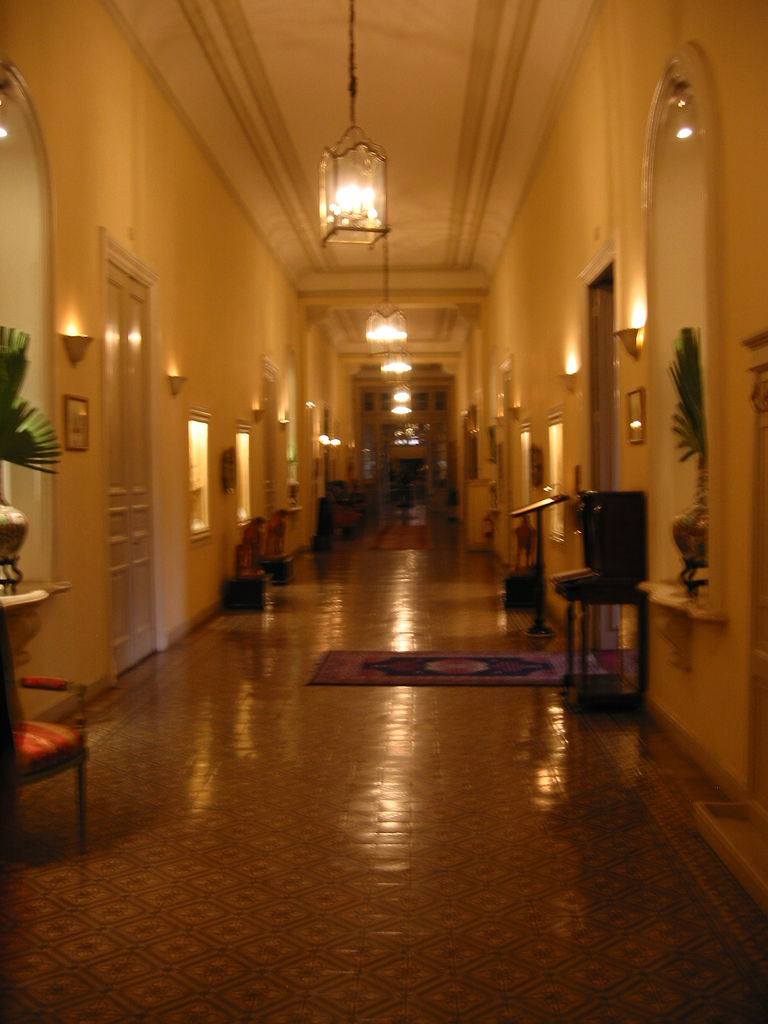
Inside the Old Winter Palace

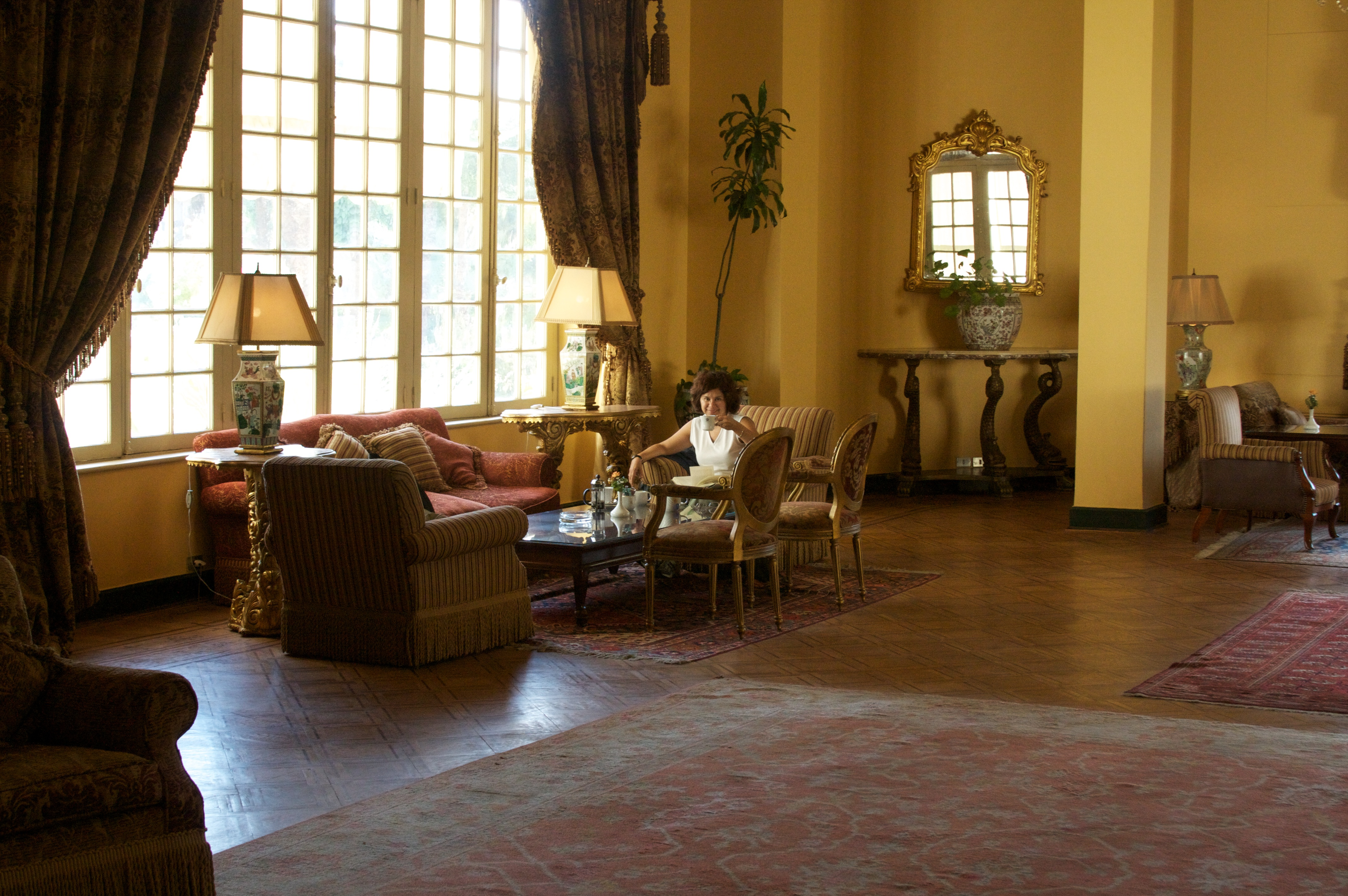
Sitting room

== See also ==
- PS Sudan
