= Thomas Ridgeway =

Thomas Ridgewayor Ridgway may refer to:

- Thomas Ridgeway (fl.1414), MP for Derby (UK Parliament constituency)
- Thomas Ridgeway, 1st Earl of Londonderry (1565?–1631)
- Thomas Ridgway (tea trader)
- Thomas S. Ridgway (1826–1897), American politician
- Thomas Ridgway (colonel) (1861–1939), U.S. Army officer

== See also ==
- Thomas Ridgeway Gould, American sculptor
