= Elba, Illinois =

- Unincorporated community
- Location within Illinois Location within the United States
- Coordinates: 37°49′35″N 88°19′35″W
- Country: United States
- State: Illinois
- County: Gallatin
- Township: North Fork
- Elevation: 361 ft (110 m)
- Time zone: UTC-6 (Central (CST))
  - Summer (DST): UTC-5 (CDT)
- Area code: 618
- GNIS feature ID: 422659

Elba is an unincorporated community in North Fork Township, Gallatin County, Illinois, United States. Elba is located on the north fork of the Saline River, 4 miles (6.4 km) west-northwest of Ridgway.
