= Bridgeway =

Bridgeway my refer to:

- a bridgeway, an enclosed passageway between the upper floors of two buildings
- Bridgeway Capital Management, American investment management firm
- Bridgeway Foundation, charity founded by Shannon Sedgwick Davis and financed by Bridgeway Capital Management
- Bridgeway, business run by P. V. Abdul Wahab
