= Nubian =

Nubian may refer to:

- Something of, from, or related to Nubia, a region along the Nile river in southern Egypt and northern Sudan
  - Nubians
  - Nubian languages
- Anglo-Nubian goat, a British breed of domestic goat
- HMS Nubian, several ships of the British Royal Navy
- Les Nubians, a French musical duo
- Nubians (Uganda), or the Nubi, a people of Uganda
- J-type 327 Nubian, a class of starship in the Star Wars franchise
- SS Nubian, a steamship

== See also ==
- Nuba (disambiguation)
- Nubia (disambiguation)
- Nubian Desert
- Nubian Plate
- Nubian pyramids
- Nubian Sandstone
- Nubian Square
- Nubian station
- Nubian Swell
- Nubian vault
- Nubian wig
