= Shannon Sedgwick Davis =

American attorney and activist

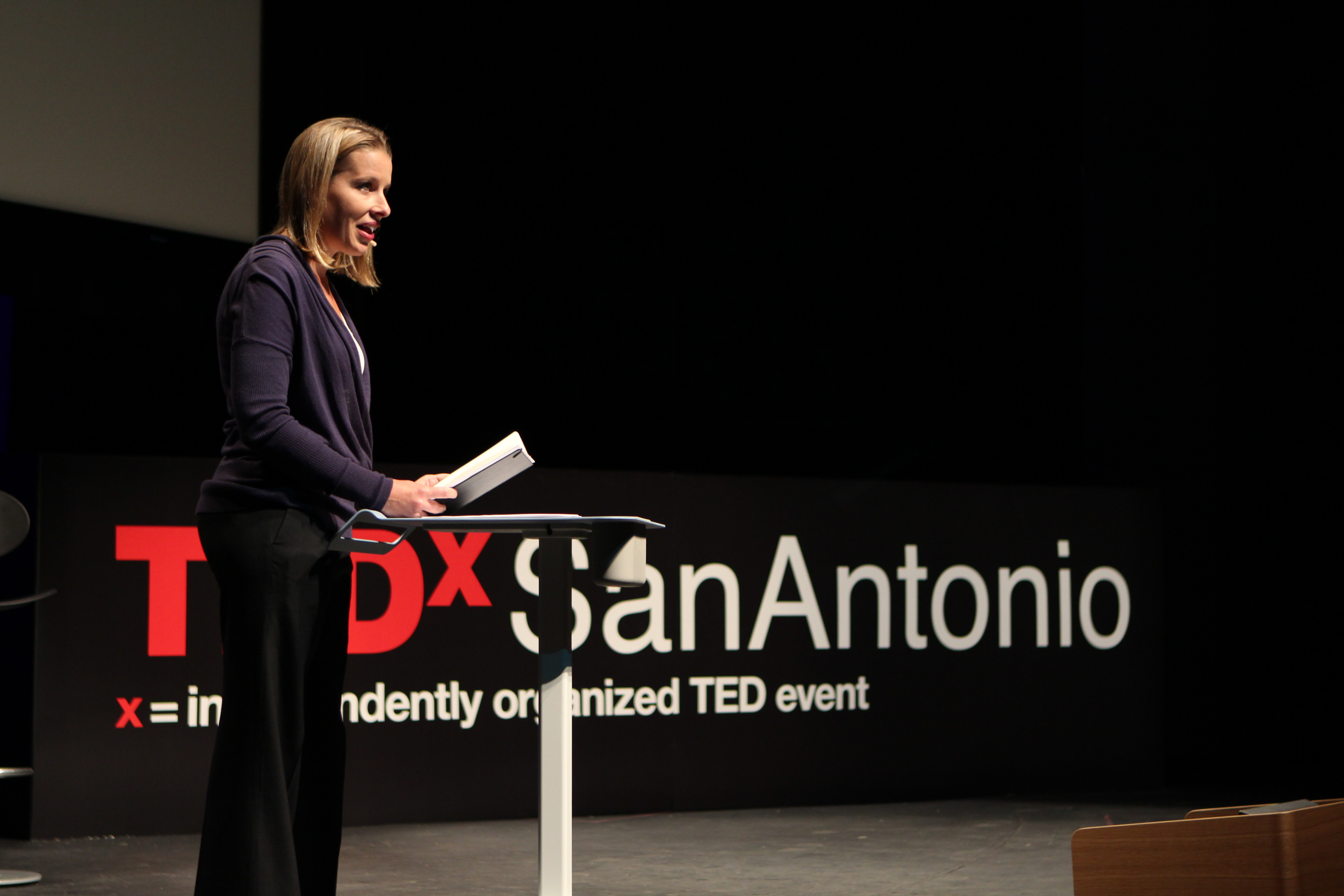

Shannon Sedgwick Davis is an American attorney and activist. She is the head of the Bridgeway Foundation, a philanthropic organization whose goal is "ending mass atrocities" around the world.

== Early career and education ==
Sedgwick Davis is an honors graduate of McMurry University and Baylor Law School.

Prior to joining Bridgeway Foundation in 2007, Sedgwick Davis served as Vice President of Geneva Global, a philanthropic consulting firm that advises individuals, foundations, nonprofit organizations, and corporations on international development, global health, and poverty solutions.

Previously, Sedgwick Davis was the Director of Public Affairs at the International Justice Mission (IJM), a human rights agency that focuses on ending slavery, forced prostitution, and illegal land seizures in the developing world. Her work in helping rescue children from sex trafficking in the Svay Pak village of Cambodia was included in the 2005 Emmy award-winning piece, “Children for Sale,” on Dateline.

Sedgwick Davis has also written for The Huffington Post.

== Books ==
In 2019, Sedgwick Davis wrote To Stop a Warlord, the true story of a collaboration to stop the atrocities of the Lord's Resistance Army. The foreword was authored by Howard G. Buffett.

== Honors and awards ==
Sedgwick Davis received Baylor's Young Lawyer of the Year Award 2011 and, in the same year, the Spirit of McMurry Award, given annually to one outstanding alumnus/a. She is the award recipient of the Nomi Network's 2014 Abolitionist Award and The Rotary Club of San Antonio's 2014 Outstanding Young San Antonian. In 2015, she received the Global Human Rights Hero award from Saving Innocence. In 2019, Sedgwick Davis received the distinguished Navy SEAL "Fire in the Gut" Award, and in the same year she was honored at the UNITAS gala. In 2020, Sedgwick Davis delivered the keynote at the Global Girls Summit, where she received their Globally Awesome Girl award. Sedgwick Davis sits on the board of several organizations including The Elders, Humanity United, Charity: Water, and, formerly, TOMS.

== Personal life ==
Sedgwick Davis currently lives in San Antonio, Texas, with her husband and two sons.

== Bridgeway Foundation ==
Established in 2000, as the charitable giving arm of Bridgeway Capital Management, the Bridgeway Foundation works to establish peace and reconciliation in international communities suffering from oppression, genocide, and other human rights violations. As an attorney and advocate for social justice, Sedgwick Davis has led Bridgeway Foundation in developing solutions in remote environments. Her organization has given financial support to organizations such as Aegis Trust, Resolve Uganda, and Invisible Children. Sedgwick Davis and the Bridgeway Foundation have been credited for their role in funding civilian protection and recovery efforts in Uganda against the Lord's Resistance Army and its leader, Joseph Kony, the first-ever indictee of the International Criminal Court. The effort, as described in the New Yorker article, has also been criticized for funding mercenaries as a means to end genocide.
