= Bridgeway Capital Management =

American asset management company

- Company type: Private
- Industry: Financial services
- Founded: 1993
- Founder: John Montgomery
- Headquarters: Houston, TX
- Products: Investment management
- Total assets: $9.4 billion
- Number of employees: 29 (2019)
- Website: www.bridgeway.com

Bridgeway Capital Management Inc. ("Bridgeway") is a U.S. asset manager based in Houston, Texas offering statistically driven institutional investment strategies, mutual funds, and sub-advisory services. Bridgeway specializes in domestic equities, and is the adviser for Bridgeway Funds, the company's family of nine no-load mutual funds. Bridgeway donates 50% of its profits to non-profit organizations, as Bridgeway founder John Montgomery established in the firm’s original 1993 business plan.

== History ==
In 1993, John Montgomery founded Bridgeway in Houston, Texas. Trained as an engineer, Montgomery began to develop his own models for portfolio management while pursuing his MBA at Harvard Business School. He began investing with the models in 1985, and due to the success of these models, he left his position in the transportation industry in 1991 to undertake the founding of Bridgeway.

Bridgeway has been recognized as a Best Places to Work in Money Management by Pensions & Investments for several years, including the latest in 2019.

== Investment approach ==
Bridgeway employs a quantitative investment process. The company believes that using a quantitative approach will eliminate biases and human emotions in the investment management process. Bridgeway applies multiple models with different factor weightings to diversify the risk associated with any one approach. Bridgeway tracks the entire stock universe and ranks each stock based on a number of factors.

The book, The Complete Guide to Factor-Based Investing: The Way Smart Money Invests Today, co-authored by Bridgeway partner Andrew Berkin and investment manager Larry Swedroe, details Bridgeway’s decades-long journey of developing a strategy for successful investing rooted in an analysis of over 100 research studies.

== Bridgeway Funds ==
The Bridgeway Funds family consists of 9 no-load mutual funds. Bridgeway Capital Management is the Adviser for all Bridgeway Funds. The Adviser is responsible for all investment decisions subject to the investment strategies, objectives, and restrictions applicable to each Fund. All Bridgeway Funds are managed according to the Adviser’s statistical, evidence-based investment process, guided by avoiding behavioral biases, rigorous testing, and risk management. Some Bridgeway Funds (referred to as “Select” Funds) are designed to pursue superior long-term risk-adjusted investment performance through diversification and multi-factor exposure. Other Bridgeway Funds (referred to as “Omni” Funds) are constructed to provide specialized exposure to their target asset class (a specific portion of the market) through broad diversification.

== Bridgeway foundation ==
Established in 2000, as the charitable giving arm of Bridgeway Capital Management, the Bridgeway Foundation works to establish peace and reconciliation in international communities suffering from oppression, genocide, and other human rights violations. As an attorney and advocate for social justice, Sedgwick Davis has led Bridgeway Foundation in developing solutions in remote environments. The organization has given financial support to organizations such as Aegis Trust, Resolve Uganda, and Invisible Children. Sedgwick Davis and the Bridgeway Foundation have been credited for their role in funding civilian protection and recovery efforts in Uganda against the Lord’s Resistance Army and its leader, Joseph Kony, the first-ever indictee of the International Criminal Court. The effort, as described in the New Yorker article, has also been criticized for funding mercenaries as a means to end genocide. Sedgwick Davis wrote an account of the group’s efforts in Uganda titled To Stop a Warlord, in which she details the nontraditional partnerships they established to combat Kony and the Lord’s Resistance Army.
