= PS Sudan =

Nile cruise ship

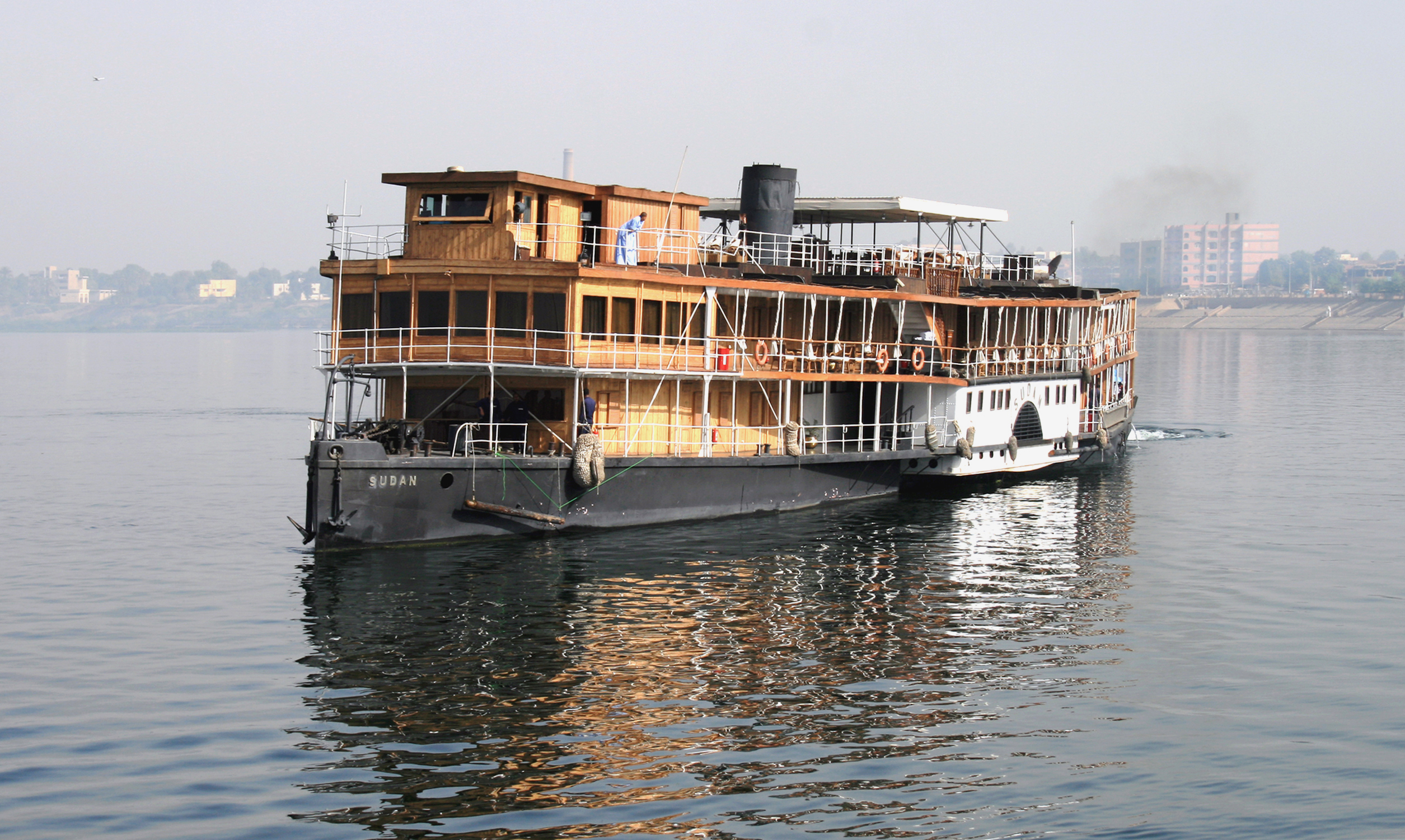
- PS Sudan on the Nile river at Aswan, April 2010

History

Egypt
- Name: PS Sudan
- Namesake: Sudan
- Owner: Thomas Cook Egypt until 1950; Fouad Serageddin 1950-55; LTI Hotels
- Operator: Thomas Cook Egypt until 1950; Fouad Serageddin 1950-55; Eastmar Nile Cruises; Voyageurs du Monde / Original Travel since 2001
- Route: River Nile
- Builder: Bow, McLachlan & Co, Paisley, Scotland
- Yard number: 315
- Launched: 1921
- In service: 1921
- Status: in service 2024

General characteristics
- Type: passenger river steamer
- Tonnage: 600 tons
- Length: 228 ft (69 m) or 236 ft (72 m)
- Beam: 32 ft (9.8 m)
- Draught: 9.5 ft (2.9 m)
- Installed power: two 500 IHP triple expansion engines
- Propulsion: Side paddle wheel
- Speed: 9.5 knots (17.6 km/h)
- Capacity: 23 cabins including 5 suites

PS Sudan is a passenger-carrying side-wheel paddle steamer on the River Nile in Egypt. Along with PS Arabia, she was one of the largest river steamers in Thomas Cook's Nile fleet.

The steamer was built in 1885 for the Egyptian royal family. It was transformed into a cruise liner in 1921.

In 1933, Agatha Christie and her husband went on a cruise onboard the PS Sudan, which inspired her to write Death on the Nile.

The steamer spent the latter years of the 20th century laid up and in deteriorating condition. In 2000, French travel company, Voyageurs du Monde, bought her and returned her to service in 2001. Alongside their UK branch, Original Travel, they now exclusively operate sailings.

In the 2004 adaptation of Agatha Christie's Death on the Nile for the third episode of the ninth series of ITV television series Agatha Christie's Poirot starring David Suchet as Poirot, some scenes were filmed on location aboard Sudan.

== See also ==
- Sofitel Winter Palace Hotel
