= Ridgeway School =

Ridgeway School may refer to:

- Ridgeway School, Kempston, a special school in Kempston, Bedfordshire, England
- The Ridgeway School & Sixth Form College, a secondary school in Wroughton, Wiltshire, England
- Ridgeway Secondary School, a secondary school in Astwood Bank, Worcestershire, England

== See also ==
- Ridgeway (disambiguation)
