= Ridgeway House =

Ridgeway House may refer to:

United Kingdom

- Ridgeway House, Ridgeway Street, Douglas, Isle of Man, one of Isle of Man's Registered Buildings
- Ridgeway House, a historic house included within Mill Hill School, a school in Mill Hill, North London, England

United States

- Ridgeway (Louisville, Kentucky), a historic house listed on the National Register of Historic Places (NRHP) in Jefferson County
- David Ridgeway House, Safford, Arizona, NRHP-listed in Graham County

== See also ==
- Marion Ridgeway Polygonal Barn, LaPorte, Indiana
- Ridgeway (disambiguation)
