= Ridgeway =

A ridgeway (road) is a road or path that follows a ridge, or the highest part of the landscape.

== Roads and pathways ==
- The Ridgeway, an ancient track in southern England, which now forms part of the Ridgeway Path or National Trail
- Ridgeway (London), a 19th-century path running along central and southeast London
- Wessex Ridgeway, an extension of the Ridgeway Path to the south west

== Places ==
=== Australia ===
- Ridgeway, Tasmania

=== Canada ===
- Ridgeway, Ontario
  - Battle of Ridgeway in 1866

=== England ===
- Ridgeway (district), a proposed unitary authority area in Oxfordshire and Berkshire
- Ridgeway, Bristol
- Ridgeway, Derbyshire, village in Eckington parish
- Ridgeway, Amber Valley, Derbyshire, hamlet near Ambergate
- Ridgeway, Gloucestershire is now called Rudgeway
- Ridgeway, Staffordshire
- Ridgeway View, Wiltshire
- Ridgeway (Enfield ward), London
- Ridgeway (Harrow ward), London
- Ridgeway (Swindon ward), Wiltshire

=== Wales ===
- Ridgeway, Newport

=== South Africa ===
- Ridgeway, Gauteng

=== United States ===
- Ridgeway, Alaska
- Ridgeway, Georgia
- Ridgeway, Iowa
- Ridgeway, Kentucky
- Ridgeway, Ohio
- Ridgeway, Michigan
- Ridgeway, Minnesota
- Ridgeway, Missouri
- Ridgeway, New Jersey
- Ridgeway, New York
- Ridgeway, North Carolina
- Ridgeway, South Carolina
  - Ridgeway Historic District, Ridgeway, South Carolina, listed on the National Register of Historic Places
- Ridgeway, Virginia
- Ridgeway, Pittsylvania County, Virginia
- Ridgeway, West Virginia
- Ridgeway, Wisconsin
- Ridgeway (town), Wisconsin
- Ridgeway Township, Michigan

=== Zambia ===
- Ridgeway, Lusaka

== Other uses ==
- Ridgeway (surname)
- Ridgeway Clocks, a clock manufacturer in the United States
- Ridgeway Radio, a hospital radio station in Dorchester, Dorset
- Ridgeway Plaza, a shopping centre in Mississauga, Ontario, Canada
- Ridgeway Shopping Center, in Stamford, Connecticut, United States

== See also ==
- Ridgway (disambiguation)
- Ridgeway House (disambiguation)
- Ridgeway School (disambiguation)
