= North Fork Township, Gallatin County, Illinois =

North Fork Township
- Township
- Location in Gallatin County

- Gallatin County's location in Illinois
- Coordinates: 37°49′10″N 88°19′12″W
- Country: United States
- State: Illinois
- County: Gallatin
- Established: November 5, 1890

Area
  - Total: 36.70 sq mi (95.1 km^{2})
  - Land: 36.50 sq mi (94.5 km^{2})
  - Water: 0.20 sq mi (0.52 km^{2}) 0.55%
- Elevation: 374 ft (114 m)

Population (2020)
  - Total: 433
  - Density: 11.9/sq mi (4.58/km^{2})
- Time zone: UTC-6 (CST)
  - Summer (DST): UTC-5 (CDT)
- ZIP codes: 62871, 62930, 62934, 62979
- FIPS code: 17-059-53702

North Fork Township is one of ten townships in Gallatin County, Illinois, United States. As of the 2020 census, its population was 433 and it contained 183 housing units.

== Geography ==
According to the 2021 census gazetteer files, North Fork Township has a total area of 36.70 square miles (95.05 km^{2}), of which 36.50 square miles (94.53 km^{2}) (or 99.45%) is land and 0.20 square miles (0.52 km^{2}) (or 0.55%) is water.

=== Cities, towns, villages ===
- Ridgway (west quarter)

=== Unincorporated towns ===
- Elba at 37.826436°N 88.326432°W

(This list is based on USGS data and may include former settlements.)

=== Cemeteries ===
The township contains these six cemeteries: Campground, Garrett, Oak Grove Church, Saint Josephs, Union Chapel and Zion.

=== Major highways ===
- Illinois Route 1

== Demographics ==
As of the 2020 census there were 433 people, 127 households, and 82 families residing in the township. The population density was 11.80 inhabitants per square mile (4.56/km^{2}). There were 183 housing units at an average density of 4.99 per square mile (1.93/km^{2}). The racial makeup of the township was 93.07% White, 1.85% African American, 0.00% Native American, 0.46% Asian, 0.00% Pacific Islander, 1.39% from other races, and 3.23% from two or more races. Hispanic or Latino of any race were 2.08% of the population.

There were 127 households, out of which 13.40% had children under the age of 18 living with them, 62.20% were married couples living together, 2.36% had a female householder with no spouse present, and 35.43% were non-families. 31.50% of all households were made up of individuals, and 11.80% had someone living alone who was 65 years of age or older. The average household size was 1.76 and the average family size was 2.12.

The township's age distribution consisted of 4.5% under the age of 18, 12.5% from 18 to 24, 14.3% from 25 to 44, 35.3% from 45 to 64, and 33.5% who were 65 years of age or older. The median age was 55.1 years. For every 100 females, there were 105.5 males. For every 100 females age 18 and over, there were 96.3 males.

The median income for a household in the township was $62,841, and the median income for a family was $66,912. Males had a median income of $50,956 versus $40,096 for females. The per capita income for the township was $56,770. About 6.1% of families and 9.8% of the population were below the poverty line, including none of those under age 18 and 16.0% of those age 65 or over.

Historical population
Census	Pop.	Note	%±
2000	540		—
2010	408		−24.4%
2020	433		6.1%
2016 (est.)	383		−6.1%
U.S. Decennial Census

== School districts ==
- Eldorado Community Unit School District 4
- Gallatin Community Unit School District 7

== Political districts ==
- Illinois' 19th congressional district
- State House District 118
- State Senate District 59
