= SS Nubia =

There have been several vessels named Nubia or SS Nubia:

- SS Nubia (1854), a passenger steamer, built by John Laird Sons & Company in Birkenhead in 1854 for the Peninsular and Oriental Steam Navigation Company
- Nubian (hulk), a cargo ship built as City of Mecca by Charles Connell & Company in Glasgow in 1871 for the City Line, Greenock. In service as the Admiralty coal hulk Nubian at Simonstown 1900-04
- SS Nubian (1876), a passenger and cargo steamer built in 1876 by the Mitchell Charles & Co. Ltd. of Newcastle upon Tyne and was operated by the Union Steamship Company
- SS Nubia (1878), a cargo ship, built by Harland and Wolff in 1878 for African Steamship Company
- SS Nubia (1882), a cargo ship built in 1882 by D. & W. Henderson & Co. Ltd. of Meadowside and operated by Anchor Line Ltd of Glasgow
- SS Nubia (1894), a passenger and cargo steamer built by Caird & Company of Greenock in 1894 for the Peninsular and Oriental Steam Navigation Company
- Nubia, a small steamer also named Nubia operated on the Nile in the late 19th and early 20th century. The steamer had two decks of private cabins, and aside from transporting people carried cargo and mail.
