= Southern Sudan =

Southern Sudan may refer to:

- the southern regions of the present-day Republic of Sudan in North Africa
- South Sudan (est. 2011), the independent republic in East Africa
- Southern Sudan Autonomous Region (1972–1983), part of the Republic of Sudan, that latterly mostly became the Republic of South Sudan
- Southern Sudan Autonomous Region (2005–2011), part of the Republic of Sudan, that latterly mostly became the Republic of South Sudan

== See also ==
- Sudan (disambiguation)
