= Nubia (disambiguation) =

Nubia is the region along the Nile in Northern Sudan and Southern Egypt.

Nubia could also mean:

== People ==
- Nubia Barahona (2000–2011), American child murdered by her adoptive parents
- Nubia Kai, American playwright, poet and novelist
- Nubia Muñoz (born 1940), Colombian medical scientist and epidemiologist
- Núbia Soares (born 1996), Brazilian triple jumper
- Onyeka Nubia, British historian, author and academic

== Fictional characters ==
- Nubia (DC Comics), a DC Comics character in Wonder Woman comics
- Nubia, one of the four main characters in the Roman Mysteries series
- Nubia, a superhero in The Boys comic book series
- Nubia Johnson, protagonist of Nubia: Real One, a 2021 young adult graphic novel written by L. L. McKinney

== Transportation ==
- SS Nubia (disambiguation), various ships
- Chinggis Khaan International Airport, also known as New Ulaanbaatar International Airport (NUBIA), serving Ulaanbaatar, Mongolia
- La Nubia Airport, serving Manizales, Colombia

== Other uses ==
- Nubia Technology, Chinese smartphone manufacturer
- Lake Nubia, Sudanese name for the portion of Lake Nasser in Sudan

== See also ==
- Nubian (disambiguation)
- Nuba (disambiguation)
