= Ridgway Township =

Ridgway Township may refer to the following townships in the United States:

- Ridgway Township, Pennsylvania
- Ridgway Township, Gallatin County, Illinois

== See also ==
- Ridgeway Township, Michigan
