= Ridgway Township, Gallatin County, Illinois =

Ridgway Township
- Township
- Location in Gallatin County

- Gallatin County's location in Illinois
- Coordinates: 37°49′14″N 88°12′48″W
- Country: United States
- State: Illinois
- County: Gallatin
- Established: November 5, 1890

Area
  - Total: 35.52 sq mi (92.0 km^{2})
  - Land: 35.50 sq mi (91.9 km^{2})
  - Water: 0.02 sq mi (0.052 km^{2}) 0.04%
- Elevation: 371 ft (113 m)

Population (2020)
  - Total: 853
  - Density: 24.0/sq mi (9.28/km^{2})
- Time zone: UTC-6 (CST)
  - Summer (DST): UTC-5 (CDT)
- ZIP codes: 62871, 62954, 62979
- FIPS code: 17-059-64031

Ridgway Township is one of ten townships in Gallatin County, Illinois, USA. As of the 2020 census, its population was 853 and it contained 435 housing units.

== Geography ==
According to the 2021 census gazetteer files, Ridgway Township has a total area of 35.52 square miles (92.00 km^{2}), of which 35.50 square miles (91.94 km^{2}) (or 99.96%) is land and 0.02 square miles (0.05 km^{2}) (or 0.04%) is water.

=== Cities, towns, villages ===
- Ridgway (east three-quarters)

=== Unincorporated towns ===
- Inman at 37.837824°N 88.173092°W

(This list is based on USGS data and may include former settlements.)

=== Extinct towns ===
- New Market at 37.791713°N 88.238372°W

(These towns are listed as "historical" by the USGS.)

=== Cemeteries ===
The township contains these ten cemeteries: Asbury, Callicott, Jackson, Jones, Lamb, New Zion, Old Cottonwood, Riley, Saint Joseph Catholic, and Saint Patrick Catholic.

=== Airports and landing strips ===
- Downen Heliport

== Demographics ==
As of the 2020 census there were 853 people, 486 households, and 325 families residing in the township. The population density was 24.02 inhabitants per square mile (9.27/km^{2}). There were 435 housing units at an average density of 12.25 per square mile (4.73/km^{2}). The racial makeup of the township was 95.19% White, 0.47% African American, 0.00% Native American, 0.70% Asian, 0.00% Pacific Islander, 0.00% from other races, and 3.63% from two or more races. Hispanic or Latino of any race were 0.23% of the population.

There were 486 households, out of which 35.20% had children under the age of 18 living with them, 36.83% were married couples living together, 15.43% had a female householder with no spouse present, and 33.13% were non-families. 32.70% of all households were made up of individuals, and 19.50% had someone living alone who was 65 years of age or older. The average household size was 1.97 and the average family size was 2.37.

The township's age distribution consisted of 18.1% under the age of 18, 5.4% from 18 to 24, 31.6% from 25 to 44, 21.9% from 45 to 64, and 23.0% who were 65 years of age or older. The median age was 42.6 years. For every 100 females, there were 82.3 males. For every 100 females age 18 and over, there were 89.8 males.

The median income for a household in the township was $63,594, and the median income for a family was $70,583. Males had a median income of $54,583 versus $30,625 for females. The per capita income for the township was $34,843. About 5.5% of families and 8.2% of the population were below the poverty line, including 19.1% of those under age 18 and 2.3% of those age 65 or over.

Historical population
Census	Pop.	Note	%±
2000	1,045		—
2010	937		−10.3%
2020	853		−9.0%
U.S. Decennial Census

== School districts ==
- Gallatin Community Unit School District 7

== Political districts ==
- Illinois' 19th congressional district
- State House District 118
- State Senate District 59
