= Ridgway, Illinois =

- Village
- Village of Ridgway
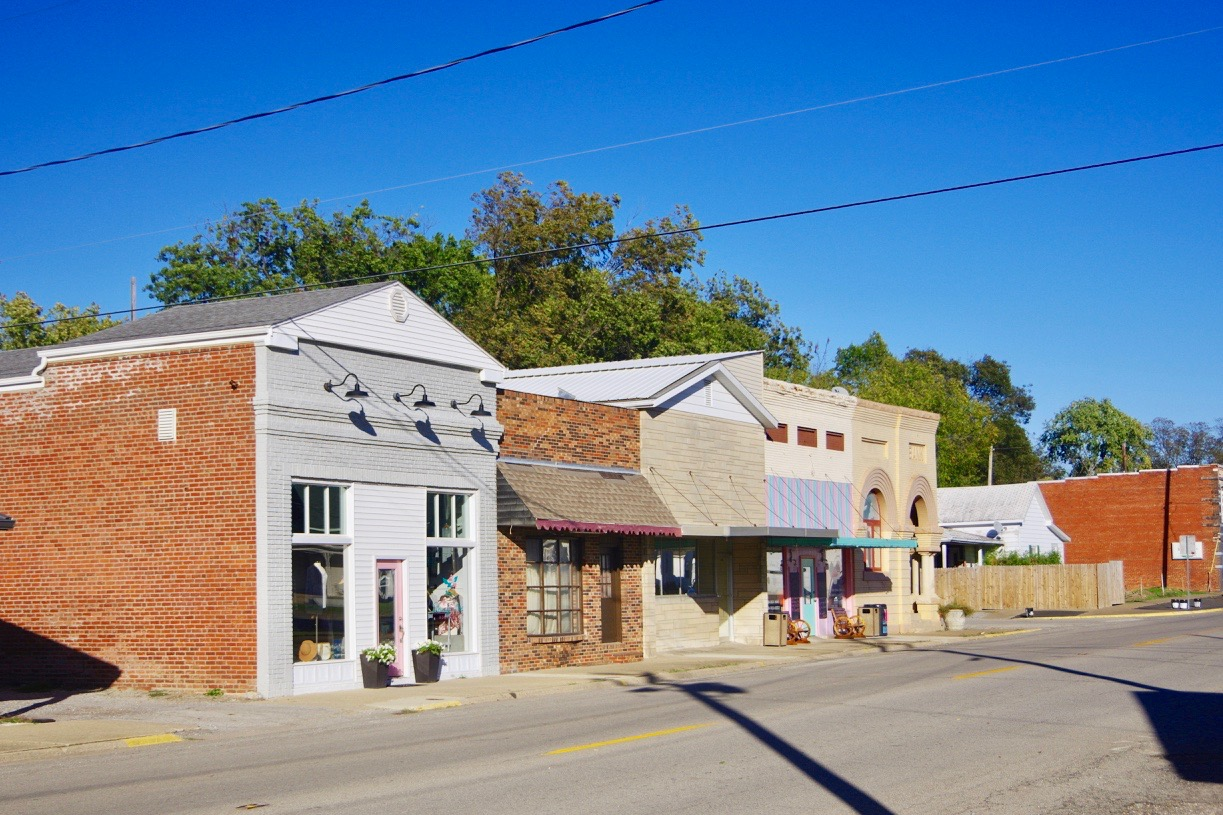
- Businesses along Main Street

- Location of Ridgway in Gallatin County, Illinois.
- Coordinates: 37°47′54″N 88°15′18″W
- Country: United States
- State: Illinois
- County: Gallatin
- Townships: Ridgway, North Fork

Area
  - Total: 0.88 sq mi (2.28 km^{2})
  - Land: 0.88 sq mi (2.28 km^{2})
  - Water: 0 sq mi (0.00 km^{2})
- Elevation: 377 ft (115 m)

Population (2020)
  - Total: 851
  - Density: 967.3/sq mi (373.48/km^{2})
- Time zone: UTC-6 (CST)
  - Summer (DST): UTC-5 (CDT)
- ZIP code: 62979
- Area code: 618
- FIPS code: 17-64018
- GNIS ID: 2399074

Ridgway is a village in Ridgway and North Fork Townships, Gallatin County, Illinois, United States. As of the 2020 census, Ridgway had a population of 851.

== History ==
Ridgway was established in 1866 as a construction camp along what would become the Springfield and Illinois South Eastern Railway. It was named for the railroad's president, Thomas S. Ridgway.

The village, once home to a popcorn plant, is the former self-proclaimed "Popcorn Capital of the World". Popcorn Day continues as part of the Gallatin County Fair and is held the second Saturday in September.

The February 2012 tornadoes, which killed seven in the nearby Harrisburg area, destroyed the St. Joseph's Catholic Church in Ridgway. The church was rebuilt in 2015 under the name "St. Kateri," in honor of Kateri Tekakwitha.

== Geography ==
Ridgway is located in southern Illinois north of the Shawnee National Forest. It is in north-central Gallatin County, 9 miles (14 km) northwest of Shawneetown, the county seat. The village is concentrated along Ridgway Newhaven Road, just east of Illinois Route 1.

According to the 2021 census gazetteer files, Ridgway has a total area of 0.88 square miles (2.28 km^{2}), of which 0.88 square miles (2.28 km^{2}) (or 99.89%) is land and 0.00 square miles (0.00 km^{2}) (or 0.11%) is water.

== Demographics ==
Historical population
Census	Pop.	Note	%±
1880	174		—
1890	523		200.6%
1900	839		60.4%
1910	1,054		25.6%
1920	1,102		4.6%
1930	930		−15.6%
1940	1,167		25.5%
1950	1,148		−1.6%
1960	1,055		−8.1%
1970	1,160		10.0%
1980	1,245		7.3%
1990	1,103		−11.4%
2000	928		−15.9%
2010	869		−6.4%
2020	851		−2.1%
U.S. Decennial Census

As of the 2020 census there were 851 people, 445 households, and 282 families residing in the village. The population density was 965.95 inhabitants per square mile (372.96/km^{2}). There were 419 housing units at an average density of 475.60 per square mile (183.63/km^{2}). The racial makeup of the village was 93.77% White, 1.41% African American, 0.47% Asian, 0.71% from other races, and 3.64% from two or more races. Hispanic or Latino of any race were 1.29% of the population.

There were 379 households, 31.4% were married couples living together, 43.3% had a female householder with no husband present.

The median income for a household in the village was $44,777, and the median income for a family was $68,958. About 10.2% of the population were below the poverty line, including 1.7% of those under age 18 and 17.2% of those age 65 or over.
