= Sudan, Iran =

Sudan سودان
- Village
- Location within Iran
- Coordinates: 31°05′05″N 49°16′33″E
- Country: Iran
- Province: Khuzestan
- County: Ahvaz
- Bakhsh: Central
- Rural District: Gheyzaniyeh

Population (2006)
  - Total: 292
- Time zone: UTC+3:30 (IRST)
  - Summer (DST): UTC+4:30 (IRDT)

Sudan (Persian: سودان, also Romanized as Sūdān and Soodan; also known as Khadain, Khāden, Khādeyn, and Sodan Umūr) is a village in Gheyzaniyeh Rural District, in the Central District of Ahvaz County, Khuzestan Province, Iran. At the 2006 census, its population was 292, in 43 families.
