= Sudan (Ibb) =

Sudan سودان
- Sub-district
- Location in Yemen
- Coordinates: 14°13′42″N 44°32′53″E
- Country: Yemen
- Governorate: Ibb Governorate
- District: Ar Radmah District

Population (2004)
  - Total: 7,014
- Time zone: UTC+3

Sudan (Arabic: سودان) is a sub-district located in al-Radmah District, Ibb Governorate, Yemen. Sudan had a population of 7014 according to the 2004 census.

== Villages ==
- Maswara village
- Sha'ab al-Sanaf village
- Al-Mawrah village
- Dar Sudan village
- Dar al-Anab village
- Haid al-Hajroup village
- Dha Ashra'a village
- Ma'azoub al-Azab village
