= Nuba (disambiguation) =

Nuba most commonly refers to the Nuba peoples.

It may also refer to:

- Nuba Mountains, the homeland of the Nuba
- Nuba languages, the languages of the Nuba Mountains
- Nuba fighting, a combat sport of the Nuba
- Nuba, Hebron, a Palestinian village
- Andalusi nubah, a North African musical form
- Nuubaat, an Algerian musical form
- Nüba, a deity in Chinese mythology
- Nuba (album), an American jazz album

== See also ==
- Nubian (disambiguation)
- Nubia (disambiguation)
