= Sudan, Zira =

Sudan Sudian
- village
- Location in Punjab, India Sudan (India)
- Coordinates: 31.0848919°N 75.0195847°E
- Country: India
- State: Punjab
- District: Firozpur
- Tehsil: Zira
- Elevation: 210 m (690 ft)

Population (2011)
  - Total: 1,725
- Time zone: UTC+5:30 (IST)
- 2011 census code: 34276

Sudan is a village in the Firozpur district of Punjab, India. It is located in the Zira tehsil.

== Demographics ==
According to the 2011 census of India, Sudan has 289 households. The effective literacy rate (i.e. the literacy rate of population excluding children aged 6 and below) is 62.14%.

Demographics (2011 Census)
| | Total | Male | Female |
|---|---|---|---|
| Population | 1725 | 890 | 835 |
| Children aged below 6 years | 209 | 115 | 94 |
| Scheduled caste | 521 | 268 | 253 |
| Scheduled tribe | 0 | 0 | 0 |
| Literates | 942 | 517 | 425 |
| Workers (all) | 548 | 501 | 47 |
| Main workers (total) | 475 | 445 | 30 |
| Main workers: Cultivators | 229 | 221 | 8 |
| Main workers: Agricultural labourers | 137 | 127 | 10 |
| Main workers: Household industry workers | 9 | 9 | 0 |
| Main workers: Other | 100 | 88 | 12 |
| Marginal workers (total) | 73 | 56 | 17 |
| Marginal workers: Cultivators | 7 | 7 | 0 |
| Marginal workers: Agricultural labourers | 60 | 45 | 15 |
| Marginal workers: Household industry workers | 1 | 1 | 0 |
| Marginal workers: Others | 5 | 3 | 2 |
| Non-workers | 1177 | 389 | 788 |
