= Original Travel =

- Type: Private
- Industry: Travel agency
- Founded: 2003; 23 years ago
- Founders: Nick Newbury; Tom Barber; Alastair Poulain
- Headquarters: London, United Kingdom
- Parent: Voyageurs du Monde
- Website: www.originaltravel.co.uk

Original Travel is a British luxury tour operator based in London.

== History ==
Original Travel was founded in London in 2003 by Nick Newbury, Tom Barber, and Alastair Poulain. Initially providing short, experience-focused holidays called Big Short Breaks, Original Travel later expanded into customised, long-haul itineraries. In 2007, it received an award at the Guardian/Observer Travel Awards.

In 2009, Original Travel acquired specialist operator Tim Best Travel and three years later, in 2012, acquired Simoon Travel. During this period, Original Travel founded Original Diving, a specialised division for diving holidays.

In 2013, Original Travel co-developed family holiday offerings with children's event planners Sharky and George.

In 2016, Original Travel moved its head office to Putney, London.

In 2017, French travel group Voyageurs du Monde acquired a 60 percent stake in Original Travel in order to expand its presence into English-speaking countries. In the same year, Original Travel began absorbing all carbon emissions from client travel, including independently booked flights and car rentals, through reforestation projects.

In 2020, Original Travel launched a European Equivalents programme with a reduced carbon footprint.

In the late 2010s, Original Travel began operations in the United States. In 2022, it acquired a controlling stake in Extraordinary Journeys, a Washington, D.C.-based adventure and safari travel specialist.

In 2025, Original Travel was included in Condé Nast Traveller's Readers' Choice Awards and was ranked fourth in the list.
