= Death on the Nile =

1937 mystery novel by Agatha Christie

- Dust-jacket illustration of the first UK edition
- Author: Agatha Christie
- Cover artist: Robin Macartney
- Language: English
- Series: Hercule Poirot
- Genre: Crime novel
- Publisher: Collins Crime Club
- Publication date: 1 November 1937
- Publication place: United Kingdom
- Media type: Print (hardback & paperback)
- Pages: 288 (first edition, hardback)
- Preceded by: Dumb Witness
- Followed by: Appointment with Death

Death on the Nile is a mystery novel by British writer Agatha Christie, published in the UK by the Collins Crime Club on 1 November 1937 and in the US by Dodd, Mead and Company the following year. The UK edition retailed at seven shillings and sixpence (7/6)(equivalent to £22 in 2025) and the US edition at $2.00 (equivalent to $45 in 2025). The book features the Belgian detective Hercule Poirot. The action takes place in Egypt, mostly on the River Nile. The novel is unrelated to Christie's earlier (1933) short story of the same name, which featured Parker Pyne as the detective.

== Synopsis ==
Hercule Poirot is vacationing in Aswan, waiting to board the steamer Karnak, which will tour along the Nile River from Shellal to Wadi Halfa. He is approached by wealthy heiress Linnet Doyle (née Ridgeway), who attempts to hire him. Linnet has recently married Simon Doyle, ex-fiancé of her former friend Jacqueline de Bellefort. Bitterly jealous, Jacqueline has taken to hounding and stalking the couple all throughout their honeymoon. Correctly suspecting that Linnet deliberately seduced Simon away from Jacqueline, Poirot refuses the commission, but privately makes an attempt to dissuade Jacqueline from "opening her heart to evil".

Simon and Linnet secretly follow Poirot to escape Jacqueline, but find she anticipated this move and boarded the steamer ahead of them. The other passengers include Linnet's maid Louise Bourget; her trustee Andrew Pennington; romance novelist Salome Otterbourne and her daughter Rosalie; young Tim Allerton and his mother; elderly American socialite Marie Van Schuyler, her cousin Cornelia Robson and nurse Miss Bowers; outspoken communist Mr Ferguson; Italian archaeologist Guido Richetti; solicitor Jim Fanthorp; and Austrian physician Dr Bessner.

While visiting Abu Simbel when the Karnak docks there, Linnet narrowly avoids being crushed to death by a large boulder that falls from a cliff. Jacqueline is initially suspected of causing the incident, but it is later discovered she never came ashore. At Wadi Halfa, Poirot's friend Colonel Race boards the Karnak for the return voyage. Race tells Poirot that there may be a secret political agitator among the passengers.

The next night, in the steamer's lounge, Jacqueline consumes several drinks, becomes angry, and shoots at Simon with a pistol. He collapses with a bloody leg, and she immediately becomes hysterical with remorse and kicks the gun away. The two other people present, Fanthorp and Cornelia, take her to her cabin. Simon is shortly brought to Dr Bessner's cabin for treatment for his injury. Fanthorp goes back to look for Jacqueline's pistol, but it has disappeared.

The following morning, Linnet is found dead with a small caliber bullet in her brain, while her valuable string of pearls has disappeared. Jacqueline's pistol is recovered from the Nile; it was wrapped in a velvet stole that Miss Van Schuyler had reported missing the day before. Two shots have been fired from the pistol.

While interviewing Louise in the cabin where Simon is resting, Poirot notes that she seems to be hinting that she knows something, while outwardly denying the fact. Miss Bowers returns what appears to be Linnet's pearl necklace, which Miss Van Schuyler, a kleptomaniac, stole. However, Poirot realises these pearls are imitation. He notes two nail polish bottles in the victim's room, one of which does not smell like polish. Louise is later found stabbed to death in her cabin. Mrs Otterbourne meets with Poirot, Race, and Simon, claiming she saw who killed the maid, to which Simon loudly declares his surprise. Someone outside the cabin shoots Mrs Otterbourne dead before she can say the killer's name.

Poirot soon confronts Pennington over his attempted murder of Linnet by pushing the boulder off the cliff; Pennington had speculated unsuccessfully with her inheritance, and came to Egypt upon learning of her marriage to trick her into signing documents that would exonerate him. However, he claims he did not murder anyone, despite his revolver being used in Mrs Otterbourne's murder. Poirot recovers Linnet's genuine pearls from Tim, whom he exposes as a professional thief. Tim had substituted an imitation string of pearls for the genuine necklace. Meanwhile, Race realizes Richetti is the man he is looking for.

Poirot tells Race, Bessner, and Cornelia that Simon killed Linnet. Jacqueline planned the murder, as the pair are still lovers. When Linnet deliberately tried to seduce Simon into leaving Jacqueline, Simon decided to go along with it so he could murder her for her money and marry Jacqueline later. Afraid of the none-too-bright Simon being caught and executed, Jacqueline concocted what she thought was a foolproof plan. On the night of the murder, Jacqueline deliberately missed Simon, who faked his leg injury with red ink. While Jacqueline distracted Fanthorp and Cornelia, Simon took the pistol, went to Linnet's cabin, and shot her. He placed the nail polish bottle that had contained the red ink on Linnet's washstand, then returned to the lounge and shot himself in the leg. Simon used the stole to silence the pistol, loaded a spare cartridge to make it seem that only two shots were fired, and threw the gun overboard.

Louise had witnessed Simon entering Linnet's cabin that night and hinted at this to Simon when Poirot was interviewing her, planning to blackmail him. Jacqueline, again in an attempt to protect her lover, stabbed Louise to death. Mrs Otterbourne saw Jacqueline entering Louise's cabin; when she went to tell Poirot, Simon had raised his voice to alert Jacqueline in the next room, and she shot Mrs Otterbourne to silence her. Poirot confronts Simon, who confesses. He is arrested, as are Jacqueline and Richetti. As the steamer arrives back in Shellal and the passengers disembark, Jacqueline shoots Simon and herself with another pistol so they may escape the gallows. When pressed, Poirot reveals he had always known she had a second pistol, but had chosen to allow her to take her own life.

== Characters ==
=== Passengers ===
- Hercule Poirot, renowned Belgian private detective
- Colonel Johnnie Race, Poirot's friend and a Secret Service agent
- Linnet Doyle (née Ridgeway), wealthy heiress
- Simon Doyle, Linnet's not very intelligent new husband and former land agent
- Jacqueline de Bellefort, Linnet's former friend and Simon's ex-fiancée, English-born but raised in South Carolina
- Mrs Allerton, kind middle-aged passenger who is affectionate to her son
- Tim Allerton, mistrustful and suspicious son of Mrs Allerton, who prejudices Poirot
- Andrew Pennington, one of the two shady American trustees of Linnet Doyle
- Carl Bessner, Austrian physician who serves as the doctor-on-scene during the mystery
- Mr Ferguson, actually Lord Dawlish, who has become a Communist and renounced his aristocratic heritage
- James Fanthorp, young solicitor and the nephew of Linnet's English trustee, who is secretly investigating Pennington
- Guido Richetti, garroulous and hot-tempered Italian archaeologist
- Louise Bourget, Linnet Doyle's greedy and secretive new maid
- Fleetwood, engineer on the Karnak, ex-lover of Marie and Louise's predecessor as Linnet's maid
- Marie Van Schuyler, arrogant and snobbish elderly American socialite, who struggles with kleptomania
- Miss Bowers, loyal nurse of Miss Van Schuyler, who takes care of her medically while also ensuring her 'idiosyncrasies' do not cause embarrassment
- Cornelia Robson,A young and impoverished cousin of Miss Van Schuyler, who serves as her companion
- Salome Otterbourne, flamboyant, sex-obsessed, oft-inebriated author of romance novels
- Rosalie Otterbourne, unhappy daughter of Mrs. Otterbourne, who unsuccessfully tries to curb her mother's alcoholism

=== Other characters ===
- Gaston Blondin, proprietor of a restaurant and an acquaintance of Poirot
- Jules, Maître d'hôtel of a restaurant who works for Monsieur Blondin
- George Wode, previous owner of Wode Hall, who went bankrupt and sold his house to Linnet
- Sterndale Rockford, Linnet's other American Trustee and Pennington's business partner
- Mr Burnaby, pub landlord who gossips about Linnet
- William Carmichael, uncle of James Fanthorp and Linnet's English solicitor
- Mr Pierce, Linnet's architect
- Ned Robson, Cornelia Robson's deceased father, who was almost forced into bankruptcy by Linnet's father
- Mrs Robson, Cornelia Robson's widowed mother
- Mrs Leech, acquaintance of Mrs Allerton and Tim, who lost a ring in Mallorca
- Toby Bryce, acquaintance of Linnet Doyle
- Lord Charles Windlesham, rejected suitor of Linnet Doyle, said to be too old for her
- Joanna Southwood, close friend of Linnet Doyle and a distant cousin of the Allertons
- Leopold Hartz, American millionaire and the deceased maternal grandfather of Linnet Doyle
- Melhuish Ridgeway, Linnet Doyle's deceased father, whose business deals with his wife's money made him a very wealthy man
- Anna Ridgeway (née Hartz), Linnet's deceased mother and the only daughter of the millionaire Leopold Hartz
- Marie, former maid of Linnet Doyle who had an affair with the already-married Fleetwood

== Reception ==
Contemporary reviews of the book were primarily positive. The short review in the Times Literary Supplement concluded by saying, "Hercule Poirot, as usual, digs out a truth so unforeseen that it would be unfair for a reviewer to hint at it."

The Scotsman review of 11 November 1937 finished by saying that "the author has again constructed the neatest of plots, wrapped it round with distracting circumstances, and presented it to what should be an appreciative public."

E. R. Punshon of The Guardian in his review of 10 December 1937 began by saying, "To decide whether a writer of fiction possesses the true novelist's gift it is often a good plan to consider whether the minor characters in his or her book, those to whose creation the author has probably given little thought, stand out in the narrative in their own right as living personalities. This test is one Mrs Christie always passes successfully, and never more so than in her new book."

In a later review, Robert Barnard wrote that this novel is "One of the top ten, in spite of an overcomplex solution. The familiar marital triangle, set on a Nile steamer." The weakness is that there is "Comparatively little local colour, but some good grotesques among the passengers – of which the film took advantage." He notes a change in Christie's novels with this plot published in 1937, as "Spies and agitators are beginning to invade the pure Christie detective story at this period, as the slide towards war begins."

== References to other works ==
- In Part II, Chapter 11, Miss Van Schuyler mentions to Poirot a common acquaintance, Mr. Rufus Van Aldin, known from The Mystery of the Blue Train.
- In Part II, Chapter 21, Poirot mentions having found a scarlet kimono in his luggage. This refers to the plot in Murder on the Orient Express.
- When Poirot meets Race, Christie writes: "Hercule Poirot had come across Colonel Race a year previously in London. They had been fellow-guests at a very strange dinner party—a dinner party that had ended in death for that strange man, their host." It refers to the novel Cards on the Table.
- In Part II, Chapter 5, Poirot mentions that "the most brilliant crime I remember and one of the most difficult to solve was committed on the spur of the moment." This remarks possibly refers to Cards on the Table as well, where the murder is committed only a few hours after the idea of murder comes into the murderer's mind. Although psychologically Poirot is sure who the murderer is, he cannot find sufficient evidence to bring the murderer to justice. Poirot is only able to solve the case by bluffing the murderer into a confession after a second murder is committed to which Poirot arranges an actor pretending to be a witness.
- About to reveal the identity of the murderer, Poirot credits the experience recounted in Murder in Mesopotamia with developing his methods in detection. He muses: "Once I went professionally to an archaeological expedition—and I learnt something there. In the course of an excavation, when something comes up out of the ground, everything is cleared away very carefully all around it. You take away the loose earth, and you scrape here and there with a knife until finally your object is there, all alone, ready to be drawn and photographed with no extraneous matter confusing it. This is what I have been seeking to do—clear away the extraneous matter so that we can see the truth..."

== Adaptations ==
=== Theatre ===
Agatha Christie adapted the novel into a stage play which opened at the Dundee Repertory Theatre on 17 January 1944 under the title of Hidden Horizon. It opened in the West End on 19 March 1946 under the title Murder on the Nile and on Broadway on 19 September 1946 under the same title.

A new adaptation by Ken Ludwig is scheduled to open at Arena Stage in November 2024.

=== Television ===
A live television version of the novel under Murder on the Nile was presented on 12 July 1950 in the US in a one-hour play as part of the series Kraft Television Theatre. The stars were Guy Spaull and Patricia Wheel.

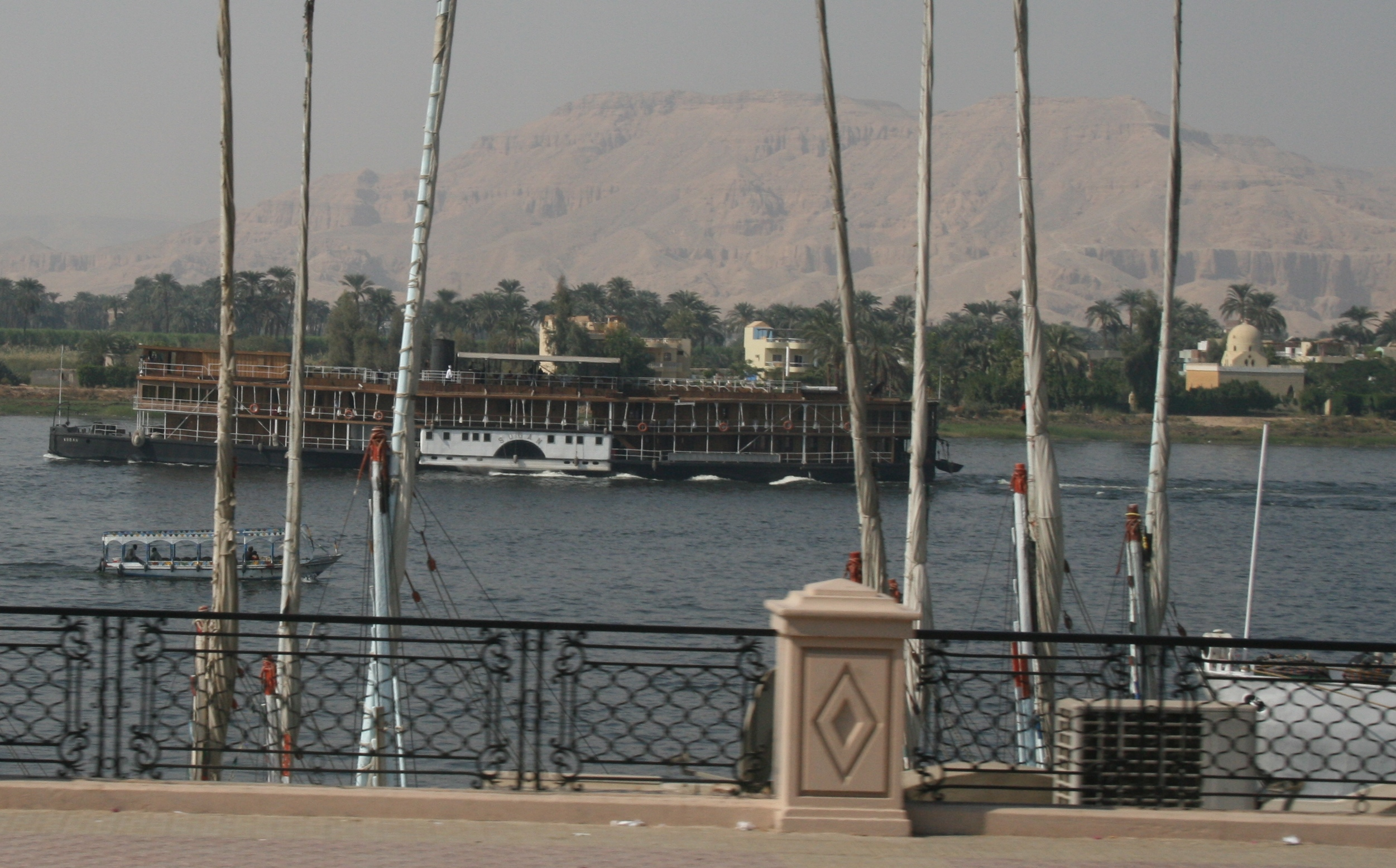
The PS Sudan was used in the Agatha Christie's Poirot version of the story (starring David Suchet) in 2004.

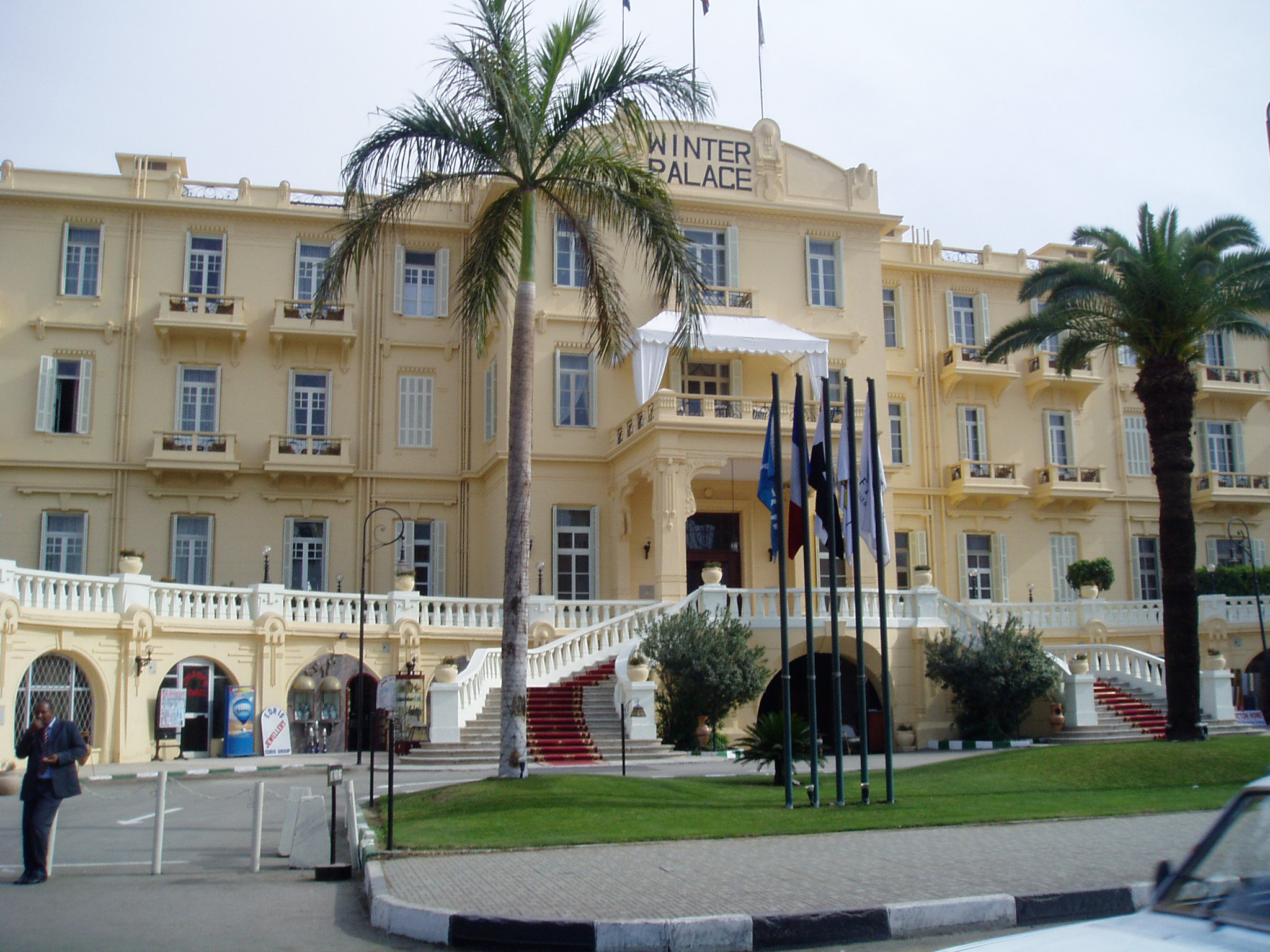
Winter Palace Hotel

An adaptation for the television series Agatha Christie's Poirot was made for the show's ninth series in 2004. It starred David Suchet as Poirot. Guest stars included Emily Blunt as Linnet, JJ Feild as Simon Doyle, Emma Griffiths Malin as Jacqueline, James Fox as Colonel Race, Frances de la Tour as Salome Otterbourne, Zoe Telford as Rosalie Otterbourne, Judy Parfitt as Marie Van Schuyler and David Soul as Andrew Pennington. The episode was filmed in Egypt, with many of the scenes filmed on the steamer PS Sudan.

=== Film ===
The novel was adapted into a 1978 feature film, Death on the Nile, starring Peter Ustinov for the first of his six appearances as Poirot. Others in the all-star cast included Bette Davis (Miss Van Schuyler), Mia Farrow (Jacqueline de Bellefort), Maggie Smith (Miss Bowers), Lois Chiles (Linnet Doyle), Simon MacCorkindale (Simon Doyle), Jon Finch (Mr Ferguson), Olivia Hussey (Rosalie Otterbourne), Angela Lansbury (Mrs Otterbourne), Jane Birkin (Louise), George Kennedy (Mr Pennington), Jack Warden (Dr Bessner), I. S. Johar (Mr Choudhury) and David Niven (Colonel Race). The screenplay differs slightly from the book, deleting several characters, including Cornelia Robson, Signor Richetti, Joanna Southwood, the Allertons, and Mr. Fanthorp. Tim Allerton is replaced as Rosalie's love interest by Ferguson.

Another film adaptation, also called Death on the Nile, directed by and starring Kenneth Branagh, was released on 11 February 2022. It is the follow-up to the 2017 film Murder on the Orient Express. Some characters and details are either omitted or differ from the novel, while the elements of the central murder remain unchanged. Tim Allerton's replacement is Bouc, who also has his mother Euphemia with him. Salome Otterbourne is now a jazz singer and no longer an obvious drunk, while Rosalie is her niece whom she adopted. Bouc is the third person killed instead of Salome Otterbourne. Linnet's lawyer Andrew is now also her cousin, and Mrs. Van Schuyler and Miss Bowers are a lesbian couple. Mrs. Van Schuyler is also the godmother of Linnet. All the suspects are friends of the married couple who have invited them to their honeymoon celebration. A World War I romance is invented for Poirot, and it is hinted that Poirot and Otterbourne have romantic feelings for each other. It also stars Gal Gadot, Emma Mackey, Armie Hammer, Annette Bening, among other stars.

=== Radio ===
The novel was adapted as a five-part serial for BBC Radio 4 in 1997. John Moffatt reprised his role of Poirot. The serial was broadcast weekly from Thursday, 2 January to Thursday, 30 January from 10.00 am to 10.30 pm. All five episodes were recorded on Friday, 12 July 1996, at Broadcasting House. Enyd Williams was the director and Michael Bakewell was in charge of adapting it.

=== Games ===
Death on the Nile was turned into a hidden object PC game, Agatha Christie: Death on the Nile, in 2007 by Flood Light Games, and published as a joint venture between Oberon Games and Big Fish Games. The player takes the role of Hercule Poirot as he searches various cabins of the Karnak for clues, and questions suspects based on information he finds.

On 16 December 2024, Microids announced a new video game adaptation titled Agatha Christie – Death on the Nile. Similar to the studio's previous title, Agatha Christie – Murder on the Orient Express, the game will faithfully adapt the original story while modernizing the plot, introducing a new dual protagonist alongside Hercule Poirot named Jane Royce, a private detective who is tracking a murderer when her investigation leads her to cross paths with Poirot. Unlike in the novel, which takes place in the 1930s, the game will be set in 1970s Egypt and various other locations, and will feature new mysteries and surprising twists.

In a statement by Microids' CEO David Chomard, the studio took feedback from fans who played Agatha Christie – Murder on the Orient Express, which was instrumental in their development of Death on the Nile, and fans can expect the game to provide "more complex puzzles and offered more freedom in the progression of the investigation". The game was released on 25 September 2025 for PlayStation 5, Steam, Xbox Store and Nintendo Switch.

=== Graphic novel ===
Death on the Nile was released by HarperCollins as a graphic novel adaptation on 16 July 2007, adapted by François Rivière and Solidor (Jean-François Miniac) (ISBN 0-00-725058-4). This is a translation of the edition that Emmanuel Proust éditions first published in France in 2003 under the title "Mort sur le Nil."

== Partial publication history ==
The book was first serialized in the US in The Saturday Evening Post in eight installments from 15 May (Volume 209, Number 46) to 3 July 1937 (Volume 210, Number 1) with illustrations by Henry Raleigh.

- 1937, Collins Crime Club (London), 1 November 1937, Hardback, 288 pp
- 1938, Dodd Mead and Company (New York), 1938, Hardback, 326 pp
- 1944, Avon Books, Paperback, 262 pp (Avon number 46)
- 1949, Pan Books, Paperback, 255 pp (Pan number 87)
- 1953, Penguin Books, Paperback, (Penguin number 927), 249 pp
- 1960, Fontana Books (Imprint of HarperCollins), Paperback, 253 pp
- 1963, Bantam Books, Paperback, 214 pp
- 1969, Greenway edition of collected works (William Collins), Hardcover, 318 pp
- 1970, Greenway edition of collected works (Dodd Mead), Hardcover, 318 pp
- 1971, Ulverscroft Large-print Edition, Hardcover, 466 pp ISBN 0-85456-671-6
- 1978, William Collins (Film tie-in), Hardback, 320 pp
- 2006, Poirot Facsimile Edition (Facsimile of 1937 UK First Edition), HarperCollins, 4 September 2006, Hardback, ISBN 0-00-723447-3
- 2007, Black Dog & Leventhal Publishers, e-book ISBN 978-1-57-912689-6
- 2011, HarperCollins, e-book ISBN 978-0-06-176017-4
- 2011, William Morrow, Paperback, 352 pp ISBN 0-06207-355-9
- 2020, HarperCollins, Hardback, ISBN 0-00838-682-X
