= Resolve Uganda =

Resolve
- Founded: 2005
- Founder: Michael Poffenberger, Peter Quaranto
- Type: Non-profit Organization
- Location: United States
- Origins: Washington, D.C.
- Region served: Central African Republic, Democratic Republic of the Congo, South Sudan, and Uganda
- Key people: Michael Poffenberger, Paul Ronan
- Website: theresolve.org

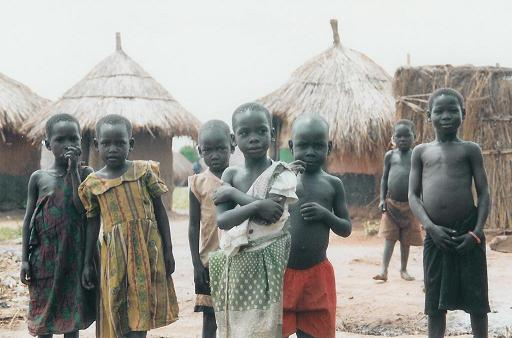
Otwal Trading Center Camp

Children with teacher in northern Uganda

Resolve Uganda began as the Uganda Conflict Action Network (also referred to as Uganda-CAN) and was an online monitoring and analysis project seeking to raise awareness of the suffering caused by the Lord's Resistance Army insurgency of northern Uganda. The campaign began in 2005. In early 2007, Uganda-CAN became Resolve Uganda, a full-scale organization aimed at securing the US leadership needed to end the war through grassroots efforts and lobbying initiatives.

== History ==
Two University of Notre Dame students traveling abroad in Uganda formed the Uganda Conflict Action Network in 2005. While overseas, Peter Quaranto and Michael Poffenberger became aware of the 19-year-long warfare atrocities caused by the Lord's Resistance Army (LRA). This hidden war left thousands of people dead, over 25,000 children abducted, and roughly 1.6 million people in camps of horrific conditions.

Inspired by the suffering of the oppressed Ugandans, they worked together to create Uganda-CAN upon their return to the states. Quaranto and Poffenberger recognized the influence that Americans could have on the Ugandan government to bring a peaceful resolution to the war. The Africa Faith and Justice Network, based in Washington, sponsored the organization. The purpose was to educate policymakers about what was taking place, with the hope that increased awareness amongst political leaders would lead to the action necessary to end the crisis. Uganda-CAN advocated peace and the renewal of the Great Lakes region of Africa, while stressing the importance of a government that answers to the needs of its most vulnerable citizens. The staff and volunteers of Uganda-CAN have worked to form partnerships in Congress and with other African related organizations in Washington as well as Ugandan organizations.

== Evolution ==
Uganda-CAN originally provided information about the LRA crisis and recommendations on how to solve it in hopes that political leaders would take action. The founders quickly realize that would not be enough. Because of competing priorities and no organized mobilization of citizens, few elected leaders were motivated or felt they had a public mandate to help end a violent conflict affecting remote communities in Africa.

Making a change would take using the knowledge gained on the crisis to create nationwide awareness and advocacy campaigns. Resolve Uganda took the place of Uganda-CAN in 2006 in hopes to. When the LRA attacked the neighboring border regions of South Sudan, Democratic Republic of Congo, and Central African Republic, the organization opted to become known simply as Resolve in 2010. Resolve now works towards advancing policy change, forming partnerships with organizations such as Invisible Children, Human Rights Watch, and Refugees International.

== See also ==
- Human rights in Uganda
- Internally displaced person
