= John L. Ridgway =

American painter

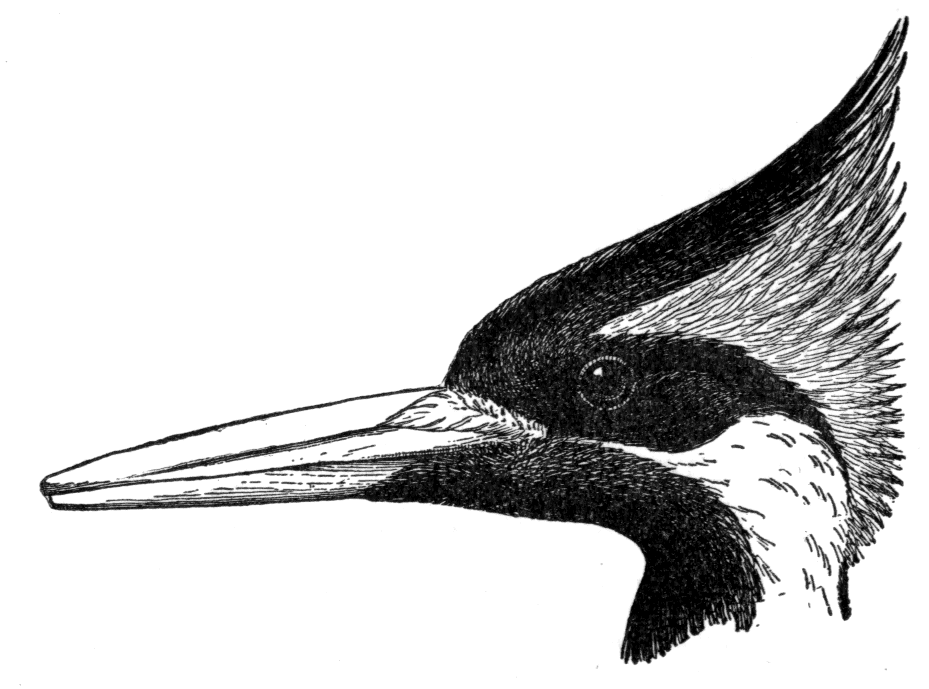
Ivory-billed woodpecker by John Ridgway

John Livzey Ridgway (28 February 1859, in Mount Carmel, Illinois – 27 December 1947, in Glendale, California) (also known as John Livsey Ridgway or John Livesy Ridgway) was an American scientific illustrator and brother of ornithologist Robert Ridgway. Ridgway collaborated with his brother on ornithological illustration and published his own works. Ridgway was born in Mount Carmel, Illinois to David and Henrietta Reed Ridgway, and attended public schools in Illinois. Robert Ridgway brought him to work as a copyist and draftsman for the United States National Museum in the 1880s. Ridgway was a draftsman for the United States Geological Survey (USGS) from 1884 to 1918, and its chief illustrator from 1918 to 1920. He also worked for the Carnegie Institution of Washington. In 1920 he moved to California, where he worked for the Natural History Museum of Los Angeles County and the California Institute of Technology, working for the latter institution up until his death.

John Ridgway illustrated several works in the fields of ornithology and paleontology. Notable among these were:

- Contributions to the Natural History of Alaska (1886)
- Report upon Natural History Collections Made in Alaska between the Years 1877 and 1881 (1887) .
- Fish and game of the State of New York: Seventh Report Forest, Fish and Game Commission (circa 1901).
- A series of watercolors of eggs of North American birds that were used as the basis of chromolithographic plates in Charles Bendire's Life Histories (1892–1895)
- Illustrations of Pleistocene fossils at the Natural History Museum of Los Angeles County (California) in the 1920s.

Ridgway authored Scientific Illustration (Stanford University Press, circa 1938) and The preparation of illustrations for reports of the United States Geological survey (USGS, 1920).
