= Robert Ridgway =

American ornithologist (1850–1929)

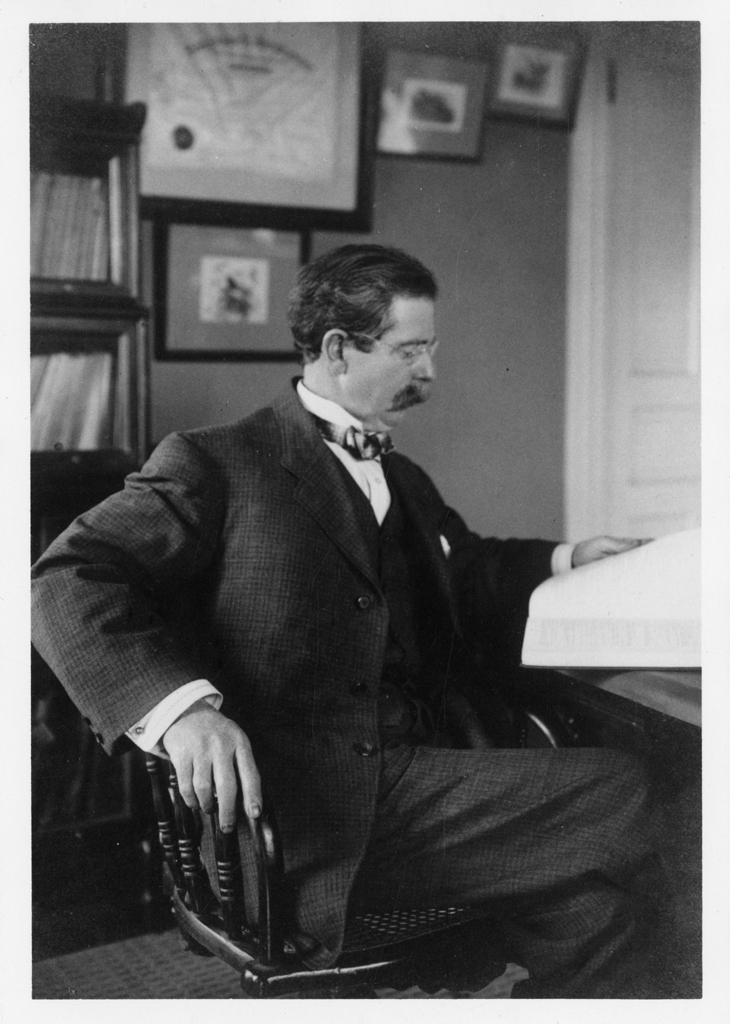
- Born: July 2, 1850; Mount Carmel, Illinois
- Died: March 25, 1929 (aged 78); Olney, Illinois
- Known for: Systematics, The Birds of North and Middle America, Color Standards and Color Nomenclature
- Awards: Daniel Giraud Elliot Medal (1919)
- Scientific career
- Fields: Ornithology
- Institutions: Smithsonian Institution
- Author abbrev. (botany): Ridgway
- Author abbrev. (zoology): Ridgway

Robert Ridgway (July 2, 1850 – March 25, 1929) was an American ornithologist specializing in systematics. He was appointed in 1880 by Spencer Fullerton Baird, secretary of the Smithsonian Institution, to be the first full-time curator of birds at the United States National Museum, a title he held until his death. In 1883, he helped found the American Ornithologists' Union, where he served as officer and journal editor. Ridgway was an outstanding descriptive taxonomist, capping his life work with The Birds of North and Middle America (eight volumes, 1901–1919). In his lifetime, he was unmatched in the number of North American bird species that he described for science. As technical illustrator, Ridgway used his own paintings and outline drawings to complement his writing. He also published two books that systematized color names for describing birds, A Nomenclature of Colors for Naturalists (1886) and Color Standards and Color Nomenclature (1912). Ornithologists all over the world continue to cite Ridgway's color studies and books.

== Biography ==
=== Early life and family ===
Ridgway was born in Mount Carmel, Illinois, on July 2, 1850, to David and Henrietta (née Reed) Ridgway. He was the oldest of ten children. He was educated at common schools in his native town, where he showed a special fondness for natural history. This interest to explore nature, both shooting with a gun given to him by his father, as well as drawing from life, was encouraged by his parents, his uncle William, and his aunt Fannie Gunn.

In 1871 he met Julia Evelyn Perkins, the daughter of one of the engravers for The History of North American Birds. Ridgway's courtship of the girl who became known as "Evvie" lasted until she reached the age of eighteen, and they were married on October 12, 1875.

=== Ornithological training and the King expedition ===
In 1864, at the age of thirteen, the young Ridgway wrote to the Commissioner of Patents, seeking advice on the identification of a bird he had seen. He enclosed a full-sized color drawing of what turned out to be a pair of purple finches. His letter eventually was referred to Spencer Fullerton Baird of the Smithsonian Institution. Baird replied, identifying the bird and praising the boy's artistic abilities, yet cautioning him to learn and use the scientific names of birds in further correspondence.

The mentor and protégé continued their exchange of letters, which led to Ridgway's appointment, in the spring of 1867, as the naturalist on Clarence King's Survey of the 40th Parallel. After a brief, intensive stint of training in Washington, where he learned to prepare study skins, Ridgway joined the expedition in May. Starting from Sacramento, California, the team explored parts of Nevada, Utah Territory, and Idaho Territory. A highlight of the trip was a stop at Nevada's Pyramid Lake. In the fall of 1868, the members of the team were reduced for funding reasons, but Ridgway returned in 1869 for more work in Utah. In an undertaking that lasted nearly two years, Ridgway collected 1,522 bird-related specimens (753 nests and eggs and 769 skins) and served as a key member on one of the four great surveys of the American West. He observed 262 species, most of these on the western slope of the Sierra Nevada. He had written most of his portion of King's report by 1872, but the "Ornithology" section was not published until 1877.

=== The Washington years ===
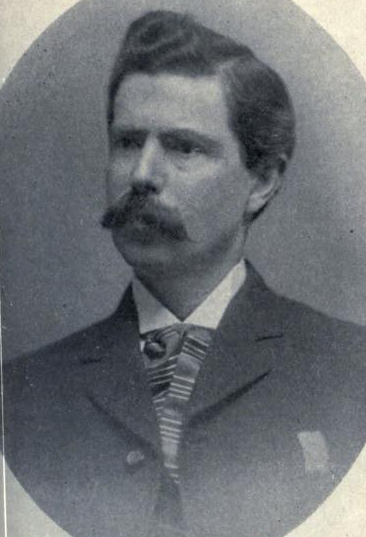
Portrait in Bird Lore 1903

Upon his return to Washington, Ridgway illustrated and wrote for Baird and Thomas M. Brewer's History of North American Birds project. He formally joined the Smithsonian in 1874, under the supervision of curator George Brown Goode. In 1880 he received the job title of curator (variously, of ornithology or of the department of birds); he was titled Curator of Birds from 1886 until his death. Working with the institution's collection of approximately fifty thousand bird skins, Ridgway devoted himself to unraveling the taxonomic relationships among North American bird species. As well, he continued his field work to collect new specimens, making several trips to his home state of Illinois, Florida, other states of the U.S., and Costa Rica. The Smithsonian exchanged study skins with other museums, either by donation or loan, and provided material and publications to collectors such as José Castulo Zeledón of the Costa Rican National Museum in exchange for specimens.

Ridgway was articulate and literate, and served as the Smithsonian's mouthpiece and representative for many years in the study of birds. He welcomed visits to the museum from colleagues and the general public alike, and would give tours. One of his responsibilities involved assembling public exhibits. In the interest of accessibility, he made books available for browsing and displayed examples of birds described in popular natural histories. As well, he showed birds from well-known poetry, species like the nightingale that are not found in North America. Returning the favor that Baird had paid him, he responded to letters from the public to identify birds and provided artist's materials to a painter in California. Nevertheless, friends and colleagues described him as almost painfully shy, and he generally shirked publicity and the limelight.

Among Ridgway's colleagues at the Smithsonian was Pierre Louis Jouy, who provided an important collection of Asian birds in 1883. Charles Wallace Richmond joined the institution in 1893 (at first, as a night watchman) and was soon tasked by Ridgway with writing reviews and other short pieces. During Samuel Pierpont Langley's tenure as Secretary, Ridgway assisted Langley's aviation research. He provided calculations of the wing loading and other aerodynamic characteristics of species like the wandering albatross, turkey vulture, and other soaring birds.

In 1883, Robert Ridgway was a founding member of the American Ornithologists' Union (AOU) and he became an associate editor of the organization's journal The Auk. He was prevailed upon to serve as an officer of the organization, but on the condition that he not be required to preside at public meetings. He served as a vice president of the AOU (September 1883 – November 1891) and as its president (November 1898 – November 1900).

As scientific knowledge expanded quickly in the second half of the nineteenth century, the need for reorganizing the system of names used to describe North American birds grew commensurately. For example, certain names assigned by William Bartram in his catalog of 1791 were now deemed unusable. Robert Ridgway addressed this need with two publications in 1880 and 1881, while Elliott Coues published a competing checklist in 1882. Ridgway and Coues, along with Joel Asaph Allen, William Brewster, and Henry W. Henshaw, came together as a committee on nomenclature and classification, serving the newly founded AOU, to reconcile the various systems and catalogs. In 1886, the committee released The Code of Nomenclature and Check-List of North American Birds, both a consistent checklist and a set of rules for the naming of birds to be described in the future. The Code settled the disagreement about capitalization of species names and established today's order of presentation, with waterbirds first and passerines last. Several of the handbook's innovations were adopted by other branches of zoology, and were incorporated into the 1905 version of the International Code of Zoological Nomenclature.

The committee's work served to standardize the way that birds are described, identifying them at the subspecies level and using a three-part trinomial name. While American ornithologists embraced the descriptive detail, European researchers of the time were reluctant to adopt it. Ridgway was an enthusiastic supporter of trinomial nomenclature, although his thinking in later life became more moderate.

=== Other affiliations ===
Robert Ridgway was a corresponding member of the Zoological Society of London; was associated with the Davenport (Iowa) Academy of Natural Sciences, the New York Academy of Sciences, the Brookville, Indiana, Society of Natural History, and the Chicago Academy of Sciences; and was a foreign member of the British Ornithologists' Union. He was a member of the permanent ornithological committee of the first international congress at Vienna in 1884. Ridgway was also honorary member of the Nuttall Ornithological Club of Cambridge, Massachusetts, for which he contributed illustrations and 48 articles to its Bulletin.

The short-lived Ridgway Ornithological Club of Chicago, Illinois (active from 1883 to about 1890), was named in Ridgway's honor, and he was an honorary member.

Although he lacked formal post-secondary education, Ridgway received an honorary master's degree in science from Indiana University in 1884, as a sign of gratitude for his supplying them with bird specimens after their museum burned down. He was listed with the title of Professor in Smithsonian annual reports and staff directories, despite his lack of a teaching appointment. He is sometimes referred to as "Dr. Ridgway," particularly by writers from his home state of Illinois. Ella Dean's profile is an example.

=== The Harriman expedition ===
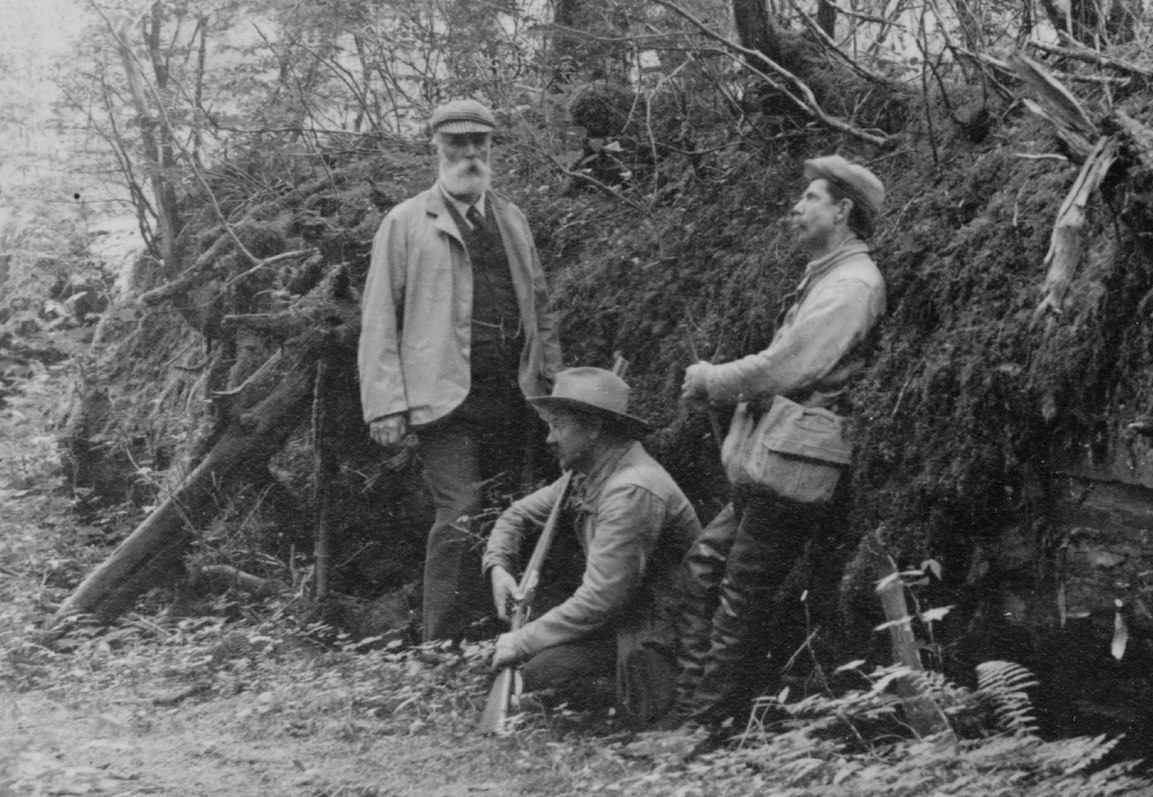
Ridgway (right) with D. G. Elliot and A. K. Fisher in Alaska, 1899

In 1899, Robert Ridgway joined E. H. Harriman on his famous Harriman Alaska Expedition. John Muir, Louis Agassiz Fuertes, John Burroughs, Edward S. Curtis, and a number of other scientists and artists made a four-month expedition to study the flora and fauna of Alaska's coastline. However, the trip did not yield significant publications by Ridgway.

=== Other family members ===
Robert and Julia Ridgway had one son, Audubon Whelock Ridgway (May 15, 1877 – February 22, 1901). "Audie" had begun a promising career in ornithology at the Field Museum of Natural History when his life was cut short by a fatal bout of pneumonia.

Robert Ridgway's second-born brother, John Livzey Ridgway (February 28, 1859 – December 27, 1947), was a nationally prominent bird illustrator who worked for many years at the United States Geological Survey, as well as the Smithsonian, the California Institute of Technology, and the Los Angeles County Museum of History, Science, and Art. The two brothers often collaborated on illustrations, sometimes with Robert doing the drawing and John the coloring.

=== Later life and death ===
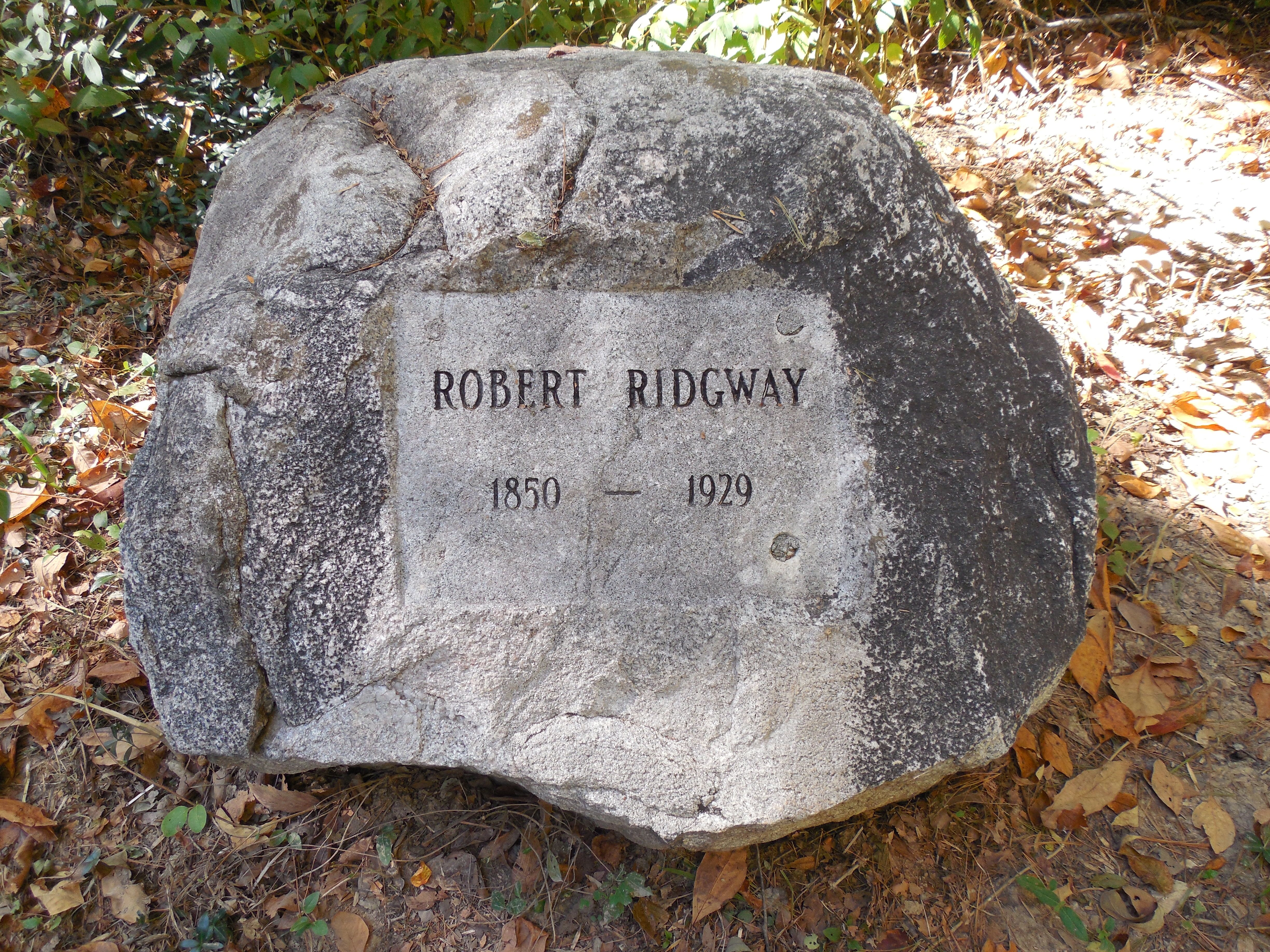
Grave marker of Robert Ridgway at Bird Haven

In early June 1913, Robert Ridgway and his wife Julia ("Evvie") moved to Olney, Illinois, to reduce physical and mental stress so that he might complete The Birds of North and Middle America, of which five of eight parts had already appeared. They built a new house on 8 acres (3.2 hectares) that they had purchased in 1906, and named the place Larchmound for two large larch trees growing on the property. Ridgway also acquired a tract of 18 acres (7.3 hectares) located in the country, to be called Bird Haven, which he developed as a private nature reserve for birds and as a nursery for cultivation of non-native plants. His skill in landscaping and tending to the grounds was such that his expertise in that area was in some demand. Bird Haven, in part, is now an Olney city park.

Evvie's death on May 24, 1927, was a severe blow to Robert. Robert continued to live at Larchmound, tending to his beloved trees and shrubs, until his death on March 25, 1929, at the age of 78. Robert was buried at Bird Haven where Julia's ashes had been scattered.

== Works ==
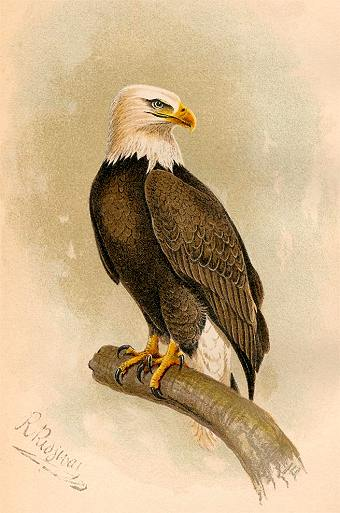
A chromolithograph of a bald eagle by Robert Ridgway, from A. K. Fisher's The hawks and owls of the United States in their relation to agriculture (US Dept of Agriculture, 1893)

Robert Ridgway's first publication, at the age of 18, was an article about the belted kingfisher. In the course of the next 60 years, he would go on to publish more than 500 titles and 13,000 printed pages, most of it concerning North American birds.

Ridgway collaborated with Brewer and Baird on the five-volume History of North American Birds (three volumes on the land birds published in 1874, and two volumes published as The Water Birds of North America in 1884). In its time, the work was considered the standard work on North American ornithology. While Ridgway primarily contributed illustrations to the land bird volumes, he wrote the bulk of the water bird volumes.

Ridgway provided full-color illustrations for his own books and those of others. He was at the peak of his artistic proficiency in the late 1870s. Even though certain of his contemporaries (for instance, Daniel Giraud Elliot) may have produced more artistically pleasing renderings, Ridgway's were the most accurate. In the words of his biographer Daniel Lewis, Ridgway "may have had the best grasp of bird coloration in the country."

With the publication of A Manual of North American Birds in 1887, Robert Ridgway condensed what was known about the continent's birds into a relatively compact 642 pages and 464 outline drawings. A prototype of today's field guides, it was quite successful, going into a second edition in 1896, and was described by Montague Chamberlain as "far away the best thing we have for the working naturalist." Nevertheless, its bulk was unwieldy for use in the field, and its identification keys depended on characteristics of the bird in the hand, not field marks. Harry Oberholser characterized the quality of the illustrations as "rarely equaled, never excelled" in beauty and accuracy.

With Stephen Alfred Forbes, he wrote a two-volume work, The Ornithology of Illinois. Ridgway's contributions were published in two parts, in 1889 and 1895. Ridgway also published a number of papers dealing with the woody plants of his region. He contributed twenty short pieces to Forest and Stream, a magazine edited by George Bird Grinnell.

=== The color books ===
Robert Ridgway published two books whose goal was to standardize the names of colors used by ornithologists to describe birds. The first, A Nomenclature of Colors for Naturalists, appeared in 1886, and was relatively small in scope, illustrating 186 colors. It proposed a simple classification system, doing away with many subjective and evocative names that were currently popular.

Ridgway sought to improve and expand upon this work. By 1898, he was in discussions with Secretary Langley about a new, expanded dictionary of color, to be published by (or at least supported by) the Smithsonian. An advisory committee was formed, with scientific illustrator William Henry Holmes as chairman and Richard Rathbun (newly appointed assistant secretary) as one of its five members. Children's game inventor Milton Bradley, who had devised a color wheel for instructional use, was consulted by the project. Langley thought it important that the work include spectral information about the colors to be cataloged, and he proposed physicist and color theorist Ogden Rood as a co-editor of the work. In 1901, however, the tension between the committee's broad vision of commercial applications for the project and Ridgway's narrow objective of a naturalist's reference book ended the Ridgway-Smithsonian collaboration in the endeavor.

Ridgway published Color Standards and Color Nomenclature himself in 1912, financed in part by a loan from his friend and colleague Zeledón. The work became a standard reference used by ornithologists for decades after Ridgway's death, as well as specialists in such wide-ranging fields as mycology, philately, and food coloring. The book named 1,115 colors, illustrated with painted samples reproduced on 53 plates. Special care was taken to ensure consistency of color reproduction across the edition, as well as the prevention of fading. The color samples were printed as large sheets by A. Hoen & Co., cut into swatches one inch by one-and-one-half inches, and pasted into each bound book.

In the book's foreword, Ridgway acknowledged the assistance of many, among them his brother John, Zeledón, and ornithologist John Thayer. With more than a thousand colors to be named, Ridgway devised some of his own imaginative identifiers (such as Dragons-blood Red and Pleroma Blue). He also paid tribute to colleagues, including Rood (with colors like Rood's Lavender), Bradley (Bradley's Blue), field guide pioneer Frank Chapman, watercolorist Samuel Prout, and others.

=== Descriptions of new forms ===
A significant proportion of Ridgway's output consisted of formal scientific descriptions of new forms of birds (new genera, species, and subspecies), many of them native to Central and South America. Many of these papers were short reports dealing with a single taxon, but he also would describe tens of new forms in a single publication, as in a paper describing 22 species from the Galápagos Islands or his Manual of North American Birds (four new genera, 39 new species and subspecies). As subsequent research has revised the taxonomy of birds, not all of the forms that Ridgway described remain recognized as distinct, but his contributions are still substantial. During his lifetime, no other ornithologist described more new taxa of American birds than Ridgway.

While most of the forms described and named by Ridgway came from outside the United States, in one instance he identified a new taxon first collected no earlier than 1881, in the Catskill Mountains of New York, an area already well-explored by ornithologists. From two specimens collected by Eugene Bicknell, Ridgway wrote the description of Bicknell's thrush as a subspecies of gray-cheeked thrush, naming it for Bicknell. The bird, a breeder of New England and southern Canada, has since been recognized as a distinct species.

From specimens collected in 1888, Ridgway was the first to describe the Española mockingbird (Mimus macdonaldi), Española cactus finch (Geospiza conirostris), and medium tree finch (Camarhynchus pauper), all endemic to the Galápagos. The latter two are members of the so-called Darwin's finch group of tanagers, significant for their impact on Charles Darwin's reasoning about evolution and the emergence of new species.

=== The Birds of North and Middle America ===
Robert Ridgway's career-crowning work, on bird systematics, was the monumental 6,000-page The Birds of North and Middle America, published by the Smithsonian in eleven volumes between 1901 and 1950. He began the work in 1894 at the direction of Goode. A major objective of the work was to resolve problems of naming and classification in the scientific literature of the time and to identify synonyms. Dry, rigorous, and technically detailed in its language, the book was not considered to be accessible by the general reading public. Continuing the pattern of the Manual (and Baird's earlier Review of American Birds), each volume featured an appendix of engraved outline drawings of generic characteristics.

Ridgway published the eighth installment of the work, commonly known as Bulletin 50, in 1919. Although he continued to work on the project, outlining a projected two more volumes, it was incomplete at the time of his death in 1929. Following Ridgway's plan but doing his own writing, Herbert Friedmann of the Smithsonian completed the final three volumes.

The Birds of North and Middle America and Color Standards and Color Nomenclature are complementary works, and indeed Ridgway divided his time between the two projects in the first decade of the century. He used his own color terms extensively throughout Bulletin 50.

== Legacy and recognition ==
Spencer Fullerton Baird and his followers emphasized precision of description, traceability through the literature, the accumulation of empirical evidence (that is, numerous specimens), and deductions drawn from facts—in opposition to the so-called "European school" of the time, which depended on personal authority. Harris calls Robert Ridgway and his Birds of North and Middle America the culmination of the "Bairdian school" of bird study. However, as ornithology around the turn of the twentieth century began to focus on bird behavior, reproduction strategies, and other aspects of the living organism, Ridgway fell behind the advances made by his colleagues of the succeeding generations. Paradoxically, because the overwhelming Bulletin 50 was so authoritative, no new publication could replace it for many years. Accordingly, systematics declined in importance as a means to study birds.

Birds named for Ridgway include the buff-collared nightjar (Antrostomus ridgwayi, also known as Ridgway's whip-poor-will), the turquoise cotinga (Cotinga ridgwayi), the Caribbean subspecies of the osprey, Pandion haliaetus ridgwayi, a Big Island subspecies of the Hawaiʻi ʻelepaio, Chasiempis sandwichensis ridgwayi, Ridgway's hawk (Buteo ridgwayi), Ridgway's rail (Rallus obsoletus), juniper titmouse (Baeolophus ridgwayi), and many other species and subspecies. The monotypic genus Ridgwayia, containing the Aztec thrush (Ridgwayia pinicola), is named for him.

In 1919, Ridgway was awarded the Daniel Giraud Elliot Medal from the National Academy of Sciences for his Birds of North and Middle America. The academy elected him to membership in 1926. In 1921, he was the first to receive the AOU's William Brewster Memorial Award, which recognizes "an exceptional body of work on birds of the Western Hemisphere."

The American Birding Association has established the Robert Ridgway Award for Publications in Field Ornithology, which recognizes professional achievements in field ornithology literature.

== Selected publications ==
- Ridgway, Robert. 1869 (March). "The Belted Kingfisher Again," American Naturalist 3(1):53–54. Retrieved January 28, 2013.
- Ridgway, Robert. 1870. "A New Classification of the North American Falconidae, with Descriptions of Three New Species." Proceedings of the Academy of Natural Sciences of Philadelphia 22: 138–150. Retrieved January 15, 2013.
- Ridgway, Robert. 1872 (December). "On the Relation between Color and Geographical Distribution in Birds, as Exhibited in Melanism and Hyperchromism." (part 1 of 2) American Journal of Science, 3rd ser., 4(24): 454–460. Retrieved January 21, 2013.
- Ridgway, Robert. 1873 (September). "On the Relation between Color and Geographical Distribution in Birds, as Exhibited in Melanism and Hyperchromism." (part 2 of 2) American Journal of Science, 3rd ser., 5(25): 39–43. Retrieved January 21, 2013.
- Baird, S.F., T.M. Brewer, and R. Ridgway. 1874. A History of North American Birds: Land Birds. Little, Brown, Boston. Volume I, 596 pp.; Volume II, 590 pp.; Volume III, 560 pp. Retrieved January 14, 2013. A special edition, published in the same year, of 50 copies contained 36 plates hand-colored by Ridgway.
- Ridgway, Robert. 1877. "Ornithology." Volume IV, part III, pp. 303–669, of King, Clarence, Report of the Geological Exploration of the Fortieth Parallel. U.S. Government Printing Office, Washington, D.C. Retrieved January 3, 2013.
- Ridgway, Robert. 1880 (September). "A Catalogue of the Birds of North America," Proceedings of the United States National Museum. 3: 163–246. Retrieved November 19, 2013.
- Ridgway, Robert. 1881. "Nomenclature of North American Birds Chiefly Contained in the United States National Museum," Bulletin of the U.S. National Museum 21:1–94.
- Ridgway, Robert. 1882. "Description of Two New Thrushes from the United States." Proceedings of the United States National Museum 4: 374–379. Retrieved January 15, 2013. Description of Bicknell's thrush, as Hylocichla aliciæ bicknelli.
- Baird, S.F., T.M. Brewer, and R. Ridgway. 1884. The Water Birds of North America. Little, Brown, Boston. Volume I, 537 pp.; Volume II, 552 pp. Retrieved January 14, 2013.
- American Ornithologists' Union. 1886. The Code of Nomenclature and Check-List of North American Birds. New York. Retrieved January 28, 2013. Members of the committee: Elliott Coues, J.A. Allen, Robert Ridgway, William Brewster, and H.W. Henshaw.
- Ridgway, Robert. 1886. A Nomenclature of Colors for Naturalists, and Compendium of Useful Knowledge for Ornithologists. Little, Brown, Boston. 129 pp. 10 colored plates and 7 plates of outline illustrations. Retrieved January 4, 2013.
- Ridgway, Robert. 1887. A Manual of North American Birds, Illustrated by 464 Outline Drawings of the Generic Characters. J.B. Lippincott, Philadelphia. 631 pp. Retrieved January 14, 2013.
- Ridgway, Robert. 1889. "A Descriptive Catalog of the Birds of Illinois," part I of Ridgway, Robert, and Forbes, S.A., The Ornithology of Illinois. State Laboratory of Natural History, Springfield, Ill. Volume I of part I. Retrieved January 22, 2013.
- Ridgway, Robert. 1890 (February). "Scientific Results of Explorations by the U. S. Fish Commission Steamer Albatross, No. I: Birds Collected on the Galapagos Islands in 1888." Proceedings of the United States National Museum 12(767): 101–128. Retrieved March 11, 2013.
- Ridgway, Robert. 1891. "Directions for Collecting Birds." Bulletin of the United States National Museum 39A: 1–27. Retrieved March 19, 2013.
- Ridgway, Robert. 1892. "The Humming Birds." Report of the National Museum for 1890: 253–383. Retrieved January 21, 2013.
- Ridgway, Robert. 1894 (November). "Descriptions of Twenty-Two New Species from the Galapagos Islands." Proceedings of the United States National Museum 17(1007): 357–370. Retrieved January 22, 2013.
- Ridgway, Robert. 1895. "A Descriptive Catalog of the Birds of Illinois," part I of Ridgway, Robert, and Forbes, S.A., The Ornithology of Illinois. State Laboratory of Natural History, Springfield, Ill. Volume II of part I. Retrieved January 22, 2013.
- Ridgway, Robert. 1897 (March). "Birds of the Galapagos Archipelago." Proceedings of the United States National Museum 19(1119): 459–670. Retrieved January 21, 2013.
- Ridgway, Robert. 1901 (October). The Birds of North and Middle America. A Descriptive Catalogue of the Higher Groups, Genera, Species, and Subspecies of Birds Known to Occur in North America, from the Arctic Islands to the Isthmus of Panama, the West Indies and Other Islands of the Caribbean Sea, and the Galapagos Archipelago. No. 50, Part I. U.S. National Museum, Washington, D.C. 745 pp. Retrieved January 12, 2013.
- Ridgway, Robert. 1902 (October). The Birds of North and Middle America. No. 50, Part II. U.S. National Museum, Washington, D.C. 854 pp. Retrieved January 12, 2013.
- Ridgway, Robert. 1904 (December). The Birds of North and Middle America. No. 50, Part III. U.S. National Museum, Washington, D.C. 840 pp. Retrieved January 12, 2013.
- Ridgway, Robert. 1907 (July). The Birds of North and Middle America. No. 50, Part IV. U.S. National Museum, Washington, D.C. 1029 pp.
- Ridgway, Robert. 1911 (November). The Birds of North and Middle America. No. 50, Part V. U.S. National Museum, Washington, D.C. 892 pp. Retrieved January 12, 2013.
- Ridgway, Robert. 1912. Color Standards and Color Nomenclature. Washington, D.C. 44 pp. 53 colored plates. Retrieved January 4, 2013.
- Ridgway, Robert. 1914 (April). The Birds of North and Middle America. No. 50, Part VI. U.S. National Museum, Washington, D.C. 902 pp. Retrieved January 12, 2013.
- Ridgway, Robert. 1916 (May). The Birds of North and Middle America. No. 50, Part VII. U.S. National Museum, Washington, D.C. 556 pp. Retrieved January 12, 2013.
- Ridgway, Robert. 1919 (June). The Birds of North and Middle America. No. 50, Part VIII. U.S. National Museum, Washington, D.C. 868 pp. Retrieved January 12, 2013.
- Ridgway, Robert. 1923 (April). "A Plea for Caution in the Use of Trinomials." The Auk 40(2): 375–376. Retrieved January 28, 2013.

== Notes ==
Also see the title page of Color Standards and Color Nomenclature, where Ridgway lists his title as "M.S."
The bibliography in Wetmore builds on that in Harris, and it details most of Ridgway's publications, including all of his plant-related works. The bibliography in Lewis supplements (and in a few cases corrects) the work of Harris and Wetmore.

== Bibliography ==
- Barrow, Mark V. (1998). A Passion for Birds: American Ornithology after Audubon. Princeton, NJ: Princeton University Press. ISBN 9780691044026.
- Harris, Harry (January–February 1928). "Robert Ridgway, with a Bibliography of His Published Writings and Fifty Illustrations" (PDF). The Condor. 30 (1): 5–118. doi:10.2307/1362947. JSTOR 1362947.
- Lewis, Daniel (2012). The Feathery Tribe: Robert Ridgway and the Modern Study of Birds. New Haven, CT: Yale University Press. ISBN 9780300175523.
- Oberholser, Harry C. (April 1933). "Robert Ridgway: A Memorial Appreciation" (PDF). The Auk. 50 (2): 159–169. doi:10.2307/4076862. JSTOR 4076862.
- Wetmore, Alexander (1931). "Biographical Memoir of Robert Ridgway, 1850–1929" (PDF). Biographical Memoirs. 15. National Academy of Sciences of the United States of America: 57–101.
