= Thomas Ridgway (tea trader) =

19th-century English tea merchant

Thomas Ridgway was an English trader who specialised in the import and sale of tea during the early 19th century.

== Tea business ==
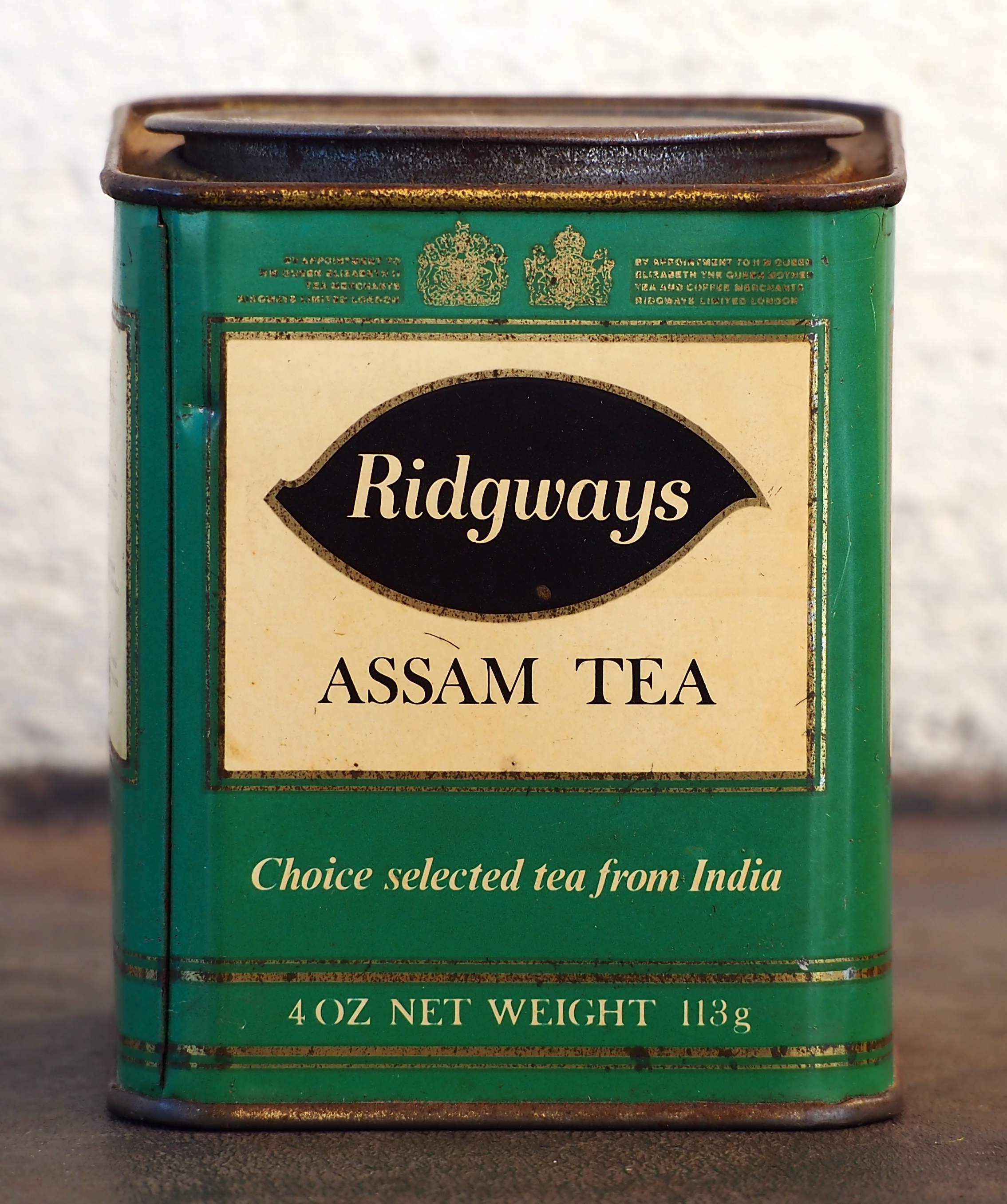
Assam tea tin; Ridgways

His first shop was in the Bull Ring area of Birmingham; this went bankrupt, and he moved to London. The new business, The Tea Establishment (Ridgway and Company) of King William Street, London, imported tea, coffee and spices, later specialising in tea. Its success enabled Ridgway to repay his creditors.

A Ridgway representative was among importers who met at the London Tavern in March 1851 to condemn the high price and the adulteration of coffee sold to "the lower class of consumer". Ridgways became one of the first companies to sell tea hygienically pre-packed as a measure against adulteration.

In 1876 Queen Victoria requested a blend for her personal use. In 1886 the House of Ridgway received a Royal Warrant for its development, and Her Majesty's Tea Blend (now called Her Majesty's Blend) is still sold today by Typhoo Tea.

In 1998 Premier Brands relaunched the Ridgways brand, stressing the continuing Royal Warrant and a commitment to Fairtrade ethical standards.
