= SS Nubian =

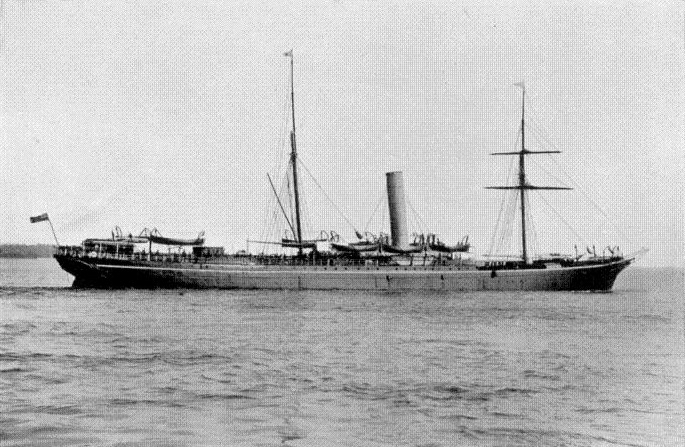
- SS Nubian after lengthening.

History
- Name: SS Nubian
- Operator: Union Steamship Company
- Port of registry: United Kingdom, Southampton
- Builder: Charles Mitchell & Co., Newcastle upon Tyne
- Yard number: 300
- Launched: 1876
- In service: 1876
- Out of service: 1892
- Fate: Lost 20 December 1892

General characteristics
- Class & type: Cargo and passenger steamer
- Tonnage: 3,091 GRT, 1,997 NRT
- Length: 109.4 m (359 ft)
- Beam: 11.8 m (39 ft)
- Draft: 8.3 m (27 ft)
- Installed power: 385 nhp
- Propulsion: Thos. Clark & Co compound engine
- Speed: 12 knots (22 km/h; 14 mph)

SS Nubian was a steamer built in 1876 by Charles Mitchell & Co. of Newcastle upon Tyne, England, and was operated by the Union Steamship Company (Southampton Steam Shipping Company) of Southampton, England. A passenger and cargo steamer with a compound engine provided by Thos. Clark & Co of Newcastle-upon-Tyne, she had a top speed of 12 knots. She later was lengthened. From 1876 to 1883, she was used for Cape mail service, and from 1884 she was used for transport between Liverpool, England, Bermuda, and Baltimore, Maryland. In 1887 she steamed to Portuguese East Africa and was used in South Africa from 1888 until 1892. She was lost in the Atlantic Ocean off Lisbon, Portugal, on 20 December 1892.

== Troop ship ==
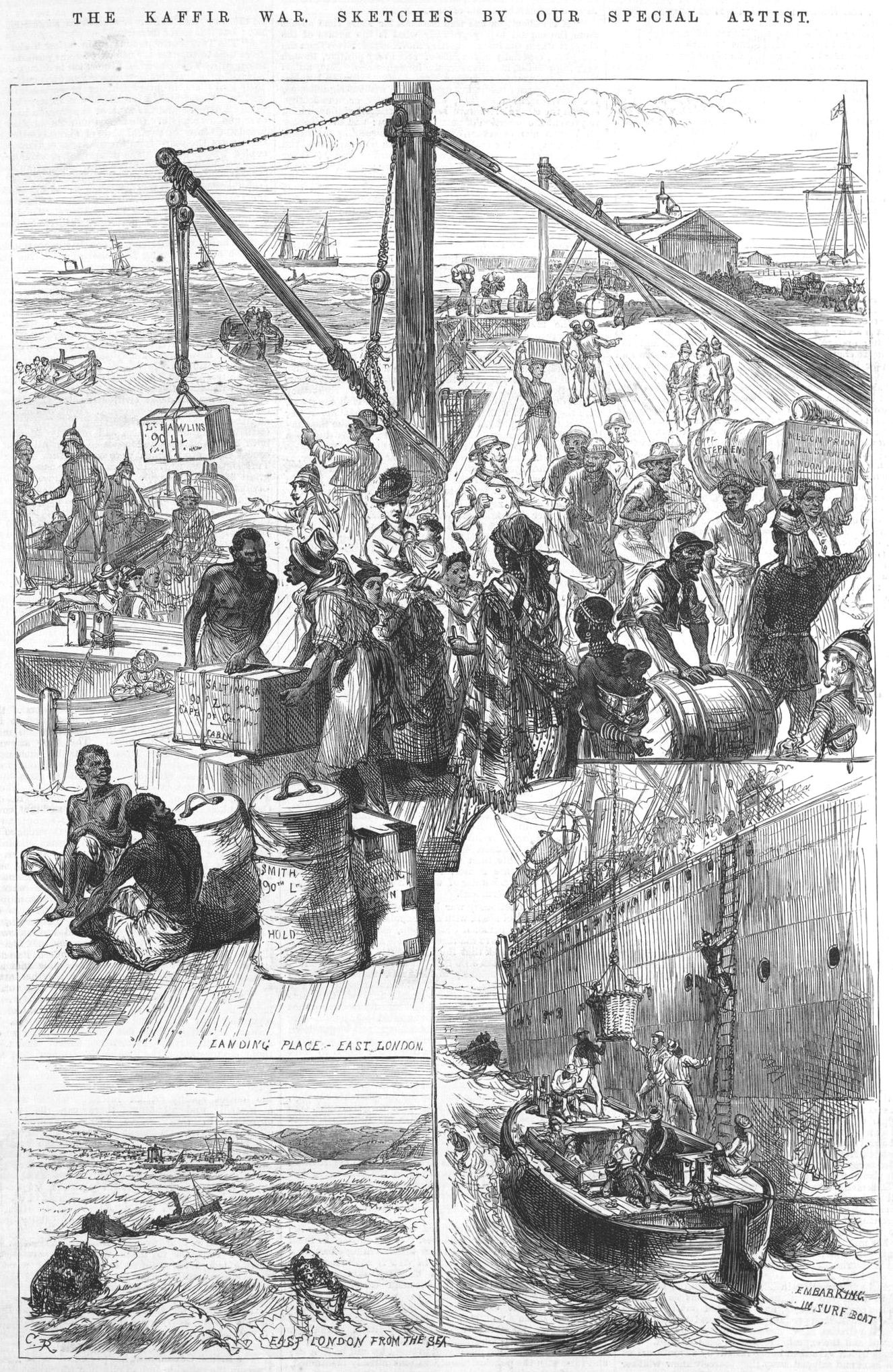
The Kaffir War sketches, of the Nubian as a troop ship, Illustrated London News, 1878, by Melton Prior

She was used as a troopship during the Ninth war (1877–1879), most notably carrying the war correspondent Melton Prior, and the 90th Regiment of Foot (Perthshire Volunteers) to East London, South Africa.
