= Thomas S. Ridgway =

American politician

Thomas Shannon Ridgway (August 30, 1826 – November 17, 1897) was an American banker and politician from Illinois. He co-founded the First National Bank of Shawneetown and was president of the Springfield and Illinois South Eastern Railway. In 1875, Ridgway was elected Illinois Treasurer, serving two years. He later served on the executive committee of the American Bankers Association.

== Biography ==
Thomas Shannon Ridgway was born in White County, Illinois, on August 30, 1826. When he was six, the family moved to Shawneetown, Illinois. When he reached adulthood, he trained for the mercantile business with E. H. Gatewood. He later became a junior partner in O. Pool & Co., later known as Peeples & Ridgway. He co-founded the First National Bank of Shawneetown with J. McKee Peeples in 1865 and was its first cashier.

Ridgway was an early investor in the Springfield and Illinois South Eastern Railway and was its president for six years. In 1875, Ridgway was elected Illinois Treasurer as a Republican, serving for two years. Upon the death of Peeples in 1879, Ridgway was named president of the First National Bank, a role he held until his own death.

Ridgway was a member of the board of trustees of the Southern Illinois Normal College, occasionally serving as the board president. He was the first president of the State Bankers' Association of Illinois and was a member of the executive council of the American Bankers Association. Ridgway was a Presbyterian and oversaw the local Sunday school for over thirty years. Ridgway married Jane Docker in 1849. They had five children: Harriette, William, Helen, Ida, and Grant. Ridgway died on November 17, 1897. He was buried in Westwood Cemetery in Shawneetown.

Party political offices
| Preceded by Edward Rutz | Republican nominee for Illinois Treasurer; 1874 | Succeeded by Edward Rutz |
Political offices
| Preceded by Edward Rutz | Treasurer of Illinois; 1873–1875 | Succeeded by Edward Rutz |
