= National Register of Historic Places listings in Niagara Falls, New York =

This is a list of the National Register of Historic Places listings in Niagara Falls, New York.

This is intended to be a complete list of the properties and districts on the National Register of Historic Places in Niagara Falls, New York, United States. The locations of National Register properties and districts for which the latitude and longitude coordinates are included below may be seen in a map.

There are 99 properties and districts listed on the National Register in Niagara County. The city of Niagara Falls is the location of 38 of these properties and districts; they are listed here, while the other properties and districts are listed separately. One additional property in the city was formerly listed but has been removed. Two of these sites, the Adams Power Plant Transformer House and the Niagara Reservation, are further designated as National Historic Landmarks.

This National Park Service list is complete through NPS recent listings posted April 24, 2026.

Contents: Counties in New York
Albany (Albany) – Allegany – Bronx – Broome – Cattaraugus – Cayuga – Chautauqua – Chemung – Chenango – Clinton – Columbia – Cortland – Delaware – Dutchess (Poughkeepsie, Rhinebeck) – Erie (Buffalo) – Essex – Franklin – Fulton – Genesee – Greene – Hamilton – Herkimer – Jefferson – Kings – Lewis – Livingston – Madison – Monroe (Rochester) – Montgomery – Nassau – New York (Below 14th Street, 14th to 59th Streets, 59th to 110th Streets, Above 110th Street, Islands) – Niagara (Niagara Falls) – Oneida – Onondaga (Syracuse) – Ontario – Orange – Orleans – Oswego – Otsego – Putnam – Queens – Rensselaer – Richmond – Rockland – St. Lawrence – Saratoga – Schenectady – Schoharie – Schuyler – Seneca – Steuben – Suffolk – Sullivan – Tioga – Tompkins – Ulster – Warren – Washington – Wayne – Westchester (Northern, Southern, New Rochelle, Peekskill, Yonkers) – Wyoming – Yates

== Current listings ==
	Name on the Register	Image	Date listed	Location	City or town	Description
1	Adams Power Plant Transformer House	Adams Power Plant Transformer House	June 11, 1975 (#75001212)	Buffalo Ave. near Portage Rd. 43°04′54″N 79°02′34″W	Niagara Falls	McKim, Mead, and White designed structure from the first alternating current electric generating plant in the world; constructed in 1895.
2	Buildings on Niagara Street at Fourth Street	Buildings on Niagara Street at Fourth Street	November 10, 2022 (#100008345)	308-328 Niagara St. 43°05′19″N 79°03′31″W	Niagara Falls	
3	Buildings at Niagara and Seventh Streets	Buildings at Niagara and Seventh Streets	March 7, 2019 (#100003433)	610-628 Niagara St. 43°05′19″N 79°03′15″W	Niagara Falls	
4	Chilton Avenue-Orchard Parkway Historic District	Chilton Avenue-Orchard Parkway Historic District	August 30, 2010 (#10000771)	Portions of Chilton Avenue and Orchard Parkway; 43°06′02″N 79°03′17″W	Niagara Falls	
5	Deveaux School Historic District	Deveaux School Historic District	June 5, 1974 (#74001281)	2900 Lewiston Rd. 43°07′12″N 79°03′36″W	Niagara Falls	Campus of school for impoverished boys; later boys prep school.
6	First Presbyterian Church	First Presbyterian Church	April 11, 2014 (#14000145)	311 1st St., Rainbow Blvd., N. 43°05′12″N 79°03′41″W	Niagara Falls	
7	First Presbyterian Manse	First Presbyterian Manse	June 27, 2012 (#12000367)	162 Buffalo Ave. 43°05′00″N 79°03′36″W	Niagara Falls	
8	First Unitarian Universalist Church of Niagara	First Unitarian Universalist Church of Niagara	January 25, 2007 (#06001301)	639 Main St. 43°05′44″N 79°03′24″W	Niagara Falls	Classical Revival style constructed in 1921–22.
9	Former Niagara Falls High School	Former Niagara Falls High School	January 24, 2002 (#01001507)	1201 Pine Ave. 43°05′36″N 79°02′08″W	Niagara Falls	High school built in 1923–24; now community arts center.
10	Hall Apartments	Hall Apartments	September 9, 2022 (#100008112)	550-552 3rd St. 43°05′32″N 79°03′34″W	Niagara Falls	
11	Holley-Rankine House	Holley-Rankine House	October 4, 1979 (#79003793)	525 Riverside Dr. 43°04′53″N 79°03′20″W	Niagara Falls	Gothic Revival cottage built about 1855; now operated as a bed and breakfast.
12	Holy Trinity Roman Catholic Church Complex	Holy Trinity Roman Catholic Church Complex	June 11, 2010 (#10000334)	1419 Falls St. 43°05′13″N 79°02′39″W	Niagara Falls	
13	Jefferson Apartment Building	Jefferson Apartment Building	January 5, 2005 (#04001452)	250 Rainbow Blvd. 43°05′10″N 79°03′33″W	Niagara Falls	Eight story brick apartment building constructed in 1926.
14	Main Street Historic District	Main Street Historic District	February 4, 2021 (#100006092)	1300-2127 Main St., 813-822 Cleveland Ave., 833 Lincoln Pl., 801-831 Linwood Ave., 1600 Lockport St., 800-909 Niagara Ave., 908-919 Ontario Ave., 832-919 Ontario Ave., 832 Pierce Ave., 1317-1329 Portage Rd., 835 Willow Ave. 43°06′21″N 79°03′12″W	Niagara Falls	
15	James G. Marshall House	James G. Marshall House	July 16, 2004 (#04000709)	740 Park Place; 43°05′45″N 79°03′26″W	Niagara Falls	Three story Arts and Crafts style dwelling built in 1913
16	Mount St. Mary's Hospital	Mount St. Mary's Hospital	December 22, 2015 (#15000922)	515 6th St. 43°05′29″N 79°03′27″W	Niagara Falls	Early 20th-century building reflects growing Catholic immigrant population
17	The Niagara	The Niagara	December 5, 2008 (#08001145)	201 Rainbow Blvd. 43°05′06″N 79°03′40″W	Niagara Falls	Former hotel building.
18	Niagara Falls Armory	Niagara Falls Armory	March 2, 1995 (#95000076)	901 Main St. 43°05′51″N 79°03′14″W	Niagara Falls	Castellated armory building constructed in 1895; part of the Multiple Property Submission for Army National Guard Armories in New York State.
19	Niagara Falls City Hall	Niagara Falls City Hall	January 26, 2001 (#00001688)	745 Main St. 43°05′45″N 79°03′19″W	Niagara Falls	Beaux-Arts style municipal building constructed in 1923–24.
20	Niagara Falls Public Library	Niagara Falls Public Library	June 5, 1974 (#74001282)	1022 Main St. 43°05′55″N 79°03′14″W	Niagara Falls	Philanthropist Andrew Carnegie funded library constructed in 1902-1904; now city offices.
21	Niagara Falls School District Administration Building	Niagara Falls School District Administration Building	December 10, 2014 (#14001020)	607 Walnut St. 43°05′34″N 79°03′19″W	Niagara Falls	1928 Classical Revival building constructed when two village school districts were merged into one city district
22	Niagara Reservation	Niagara Reservation	October 15, 1966 (#66000555)	Niagara Reservation; 43°04′54″N 79°03′55″W	Niagara Falls	Oldest state park in the United States, established in 1885.
23	Oakwood Cemetery	Oakwood Cemetery	September 10, 2014 (#14000581)	763 Portage Rd. 43°05′49″N 79°03′00″W	Niagara Falls	1852 cemetery has special section for people who went over the falls in a barrel
24	Park Place Historic District	Park Place Historic District	October 1, 2010 (#10000809)	Park Place, portions of Prince Ave., 4th St., and Main St. 43°05′44″N 79°03′25″W	Niagara Falls	
25	Sacred Heart Roman Catholic Church Complex	Sacred Heart Roman Catholic Church Complex	December 3, 2019 (#100004736)	1112 South Ave. 43°06′22″N 79°02′54″W	Niagara Falls	1889 church with early 20th century school built for congregation founded 1855
26	The Sagamore Apartments and Shops	The Sagamore Apartments and Shops	September 9, 2022 (#100008113)	518-524, 530 Main St. 43°05′30″N 79°03′35″W	Niagara Falls	
27	St. Mary's Nurses' Residence	St. Mary's Nurses' Residence	July 16, 2004 (#04000711)	542 6th St. 43°05′35″N 79°03′21″W	Niagara Falls	Brick residence hall constructed in 1928.
28	Schoellkopf Hall	Schoellkopf Hall	March 27, 2023 (#100008744)	2900 Lewiston Rd. 43°07′12″N 79°03′35″W	Niagara Falls	
29	Schoellkopf Power Station No. 3 Site	Schoellkopf Power Station No. 3 Site	February 20, 2013 (#13000029)	East bank of Niagara River; 1,600 feet (490 m) downriver from Rainbow Bridge; 43°05′35″N 79°03′44″W	Niagara Falls	Stone wall is most visible remnant of power plant whose 1956 collapse into the river cleared the way for development of Niagara Power Project, considered culmination of effort to put utilities in public hands.
30	Seippel Bakery and Richard Apartments	Seippel Bakery and Richard Apartments	May 18, 2018 (#SG100002463)	531 3rd St. 43°05′31″N 79°03′33″W	Niagara Falls	1913 mixed-used Renaissance Revival mixed-use building expanded in 1926
31	Hazard H. Sheldon House	Hazard H. Sheldon House	May 11, 2011 (#11000275)	539 4th St. 43°05′31″N 79°03′28″W	Niagara Falls	Italian Villa style stone dwelling built about 1857.
32	South Junior High School	South Junior High School	June 7, 2016 (#16000344)	561 Portage Rd. 43°05′33″N 79°02′46″W	Niagara Falls	
33	Tatler Club		May 13, 2024 (#100010270)	6 Fourth Street; 43°04′54″N 79°03′27″W	Niagara Falls	
34	U.S. Customhouse	U.S. Customhouse	July 16, 1973 (#73001227)	2245 Whirlpool St. 43°06′35″N 79°03′21″W	Niagara Falls	Stone customhouse constructed in 1863.
35	United Office Building	United Office Building	January 18, 2006 (#05001537)	220 Rainbow Blvd. 43°05′14″N 79°03′45″W	Niagara Falls	Art deco 20-story skyscraper completed in 1929.
36	US Post Office-Niagara Falls Main	US Post Office-Niagara Falls Main	May 11, 1989 (#88002379)	615 Main St. 43°05′34″N 79°03′25″W	Niagara Falls	Post office built in 1904-1907; part of the Multiple Property Submission for the US Post Offices in New York State, 1858-1943.
37	Whitney Mansion	Whitney Mansion	January 17, 1974 (#74001283)	335 Buffalo Ave. 43°04′54″N 79°03′31″W	Niagara Falls	Two-story Greek Revival stone structure built in 1849.
38	Johann Williams Farm	Johann Williams Farm	January 10, 1980 (#80002730)	10831 Cayuga Dr. 43°05′29″N 78°56′36″W	Niagara Falls	Farmhouse and related outbuildings dating to 1840s.

== Former listings ==
	Name on the Register	Image	Date listed	Date removed	Location	City or town	Description
1	Shredded Wheat Office Building		October 18, 1974 (#74002329)	January 1, 1977	430 Buffalo Avenue	Niagara Falls	Demolished in December 1976.

== See also ==
- National Register of Historic Places listings in New York
