= Marshall House =

Marshall House, or variations such as Marshall Hall, may refer to:

== in the United Kingdom ==
- Marshall House, Cambridge

== in the United States ==
- Marshall House (Little Rock, Arkansas), listed on the National Register of Historic Places (NRHP)
- Couch-Marshall House, Magnolia, Arkansas, listed on the NRHP in Columbia County
- Sam Marshall House, Morning Star, Arkansas, listed on the NRHP in Searcy County
- Slack-Comstock-Marshall Farm, Uniontown, Arkansas, NRHP-listed
- John Marshall House Site, Old Shawneetown, Illinois, listed on the NRHP in Gallatin County
- Thomas R. Marshall House, Columbia City, Indiana, NRHP-listed
- Marshall-Yohe House, Lincoln, Kansas, listed on the NRHP in Lincoln County, Kansas
- John Marshall Sr. House, Anchorage, Kentucky, listed on the NRHP in Anchorage, Kentucky
- Penn-Marshall Stone House, Harvieland, Kentucky, listed on the NRHP in Franklin County, Kentucky
- Marshall House (Junction City, Kentucky), listed on the NRHP in Boyle County, Kentucky
- Marshall-Bryan House, Nicholasville, Kentucky, listed on the NRHP in Jessamine County, Kentucky
- Marshall Hall, Maryland, Bryan's Road, Maryland, NRHP-listed
- Benjamin Marshall House, Dublin, New Hampshire, listed on the NRHP in Cheshire County
- Robert Marshall House, Blenheim, New Jersey, listed on the NRHP in Camden County
- James W. Marshall House, Lambertville, New Jersey, NRHP-listed
- Marshall House (Canandaigua, New York), NRHP-listed
- James G. Marshall House, Niagara Falls, New York, NRHP-listed
- Paul Marshall House, Plattsburgh, New York, NRHP-listed
- Marshall House (Schuylerville, New York), NRHP-listed
- Marshall-Harris-Richardson House, Raleigh, North Carolina, listed on the NRHP in Wake County
- David Marshall House, Dublin, Ohio, listed on the NRHP in Franklin County, Ohio
- James E. Marshall House, Sandusky, Ohio, listed on the NRHP in Sandusky, Ohio
- Sprague-Marshall-Bowie House, Portland, Oregon, NRHP-listed
- Thomas Marshall House (Dayton, Pennsylvania), NRHP-listed
- Humphry Marshall House, Marshallton, Pennsylvania, NRHP-listed
- Debruhl-Marshall House, Columbia, South Carolina, NRHP-listed
- Caleb H. Marshall House, St. Johnsbury, Vermont, listed on the NRHP in Caledonia County, Vermont
- Marshall House (Alexandria, Virginia), the site of the first significant battle death of the American Civil War
- Marshall-Rucker-Smith House, Charlottesville, Virginia, NRHP-listed
- General George C. Marshall's Dodona Manor, Leesburg, Virginia, NRHP-listed
- Ballard-Marshall House, Orange, Virginia, listed on the NRHP in Orange County
- John Marshall House, Richmond, Virginia, NRHP-listed
- Marshall House (New Cumberland, West Virginia), listed on the NRHP in West Virginia
- James Marshall House (Shepherdstown, West Virginia), NRHP-listed
- Marshall Memorial Hall, Lake Delton, Wisconsin, listed on the NRHP in Sauk County, Wisconsin
- The Marshall House (Savannah, Georgia)

== See also ==
- James Marshall House (disambiguation)
- Thomas Marshall House (disambiguation)
- Marshall Houts (1919-1993), American attorney
