= National Register of Historic Places listings in Gallatin County, Illinois =

Location of Gallatin County in Illinois

This is a list of the National Register of Historic Places listings in Gallatin County, Illinois.

This is intended to be a complete list of the properties and districts on the National Register of Historic Places in Gallatin County, Illinois, United States. Latitude and longitude coordinates are provided for many National Register properties and districts; these locations may be seen together in a map.

There are 6 properties and districts listed on the National Register in the county, and one former listing.

This National Park Service list is complete through NPS recent listings posted September 26, 2025.

== Current listings ==
	Name on the Register	Image	Date listed	Location	City or town	Description
1	Camp Mather-Camp Logan	Camp Mather-Camp Logan	August 6, 1998 (#98000983)	10765 Illinois Route 13; 37°42′24″N 88°10′42″W	Shawneetown	
2	Crenshaw House	Crenshaw House	May 29, 1985 (#85001164)	Off Illinois Route 1; 37°43′49″N 88°17′33″W	Equality	
3	Duffy Site	Duffy Site	August 26, 1977 (#77000485)	Sally Hardin Rd., southeast of New Haven; 37°51′31″N 88°05′47″W	New Haven	
4	John Marshall House Site	John Marshall House Site	January 21, 1975 (#75000659)	Main St. south of Adams St., along the Ohio River; 37°41′39″N 88°08′11″W	Old Shawneetown	
5	Saline Springs	Saline Springs	May 24, 1973 (#73000702)	Salt Well Rd., ½ mile west of the Saline River bridge 37°42′18″N 88°17′43″W	Equality	
6	State Bank	State Bank	April 19, 1972 (#72000459)	Corner of Main and Washington Sts. 37°41′48″N 88°08′07″W	Old Shawneetown	

== Former listings ==
	Name on the Register	Image	Date listed	Date removed	Location	City or town	Description
1	Robert and John McKee Peeples Houses	Robert and John McKee Peeples Houses	February 24, 1983 (#83000317)	January 2, 2020	Main St. 37°41′53″N 88°08′02″W	Old Shawneetown	

== See also ==
- List of National Historic Landmarks in Illinois
- National Register of Historic Places listings in Illinois
