= Jefferson Building =

Jefferson Building may refer to:

- Thomas Jefferson Building, in Washington, D.C
- Jefferson Standard Building, in Greensboro, North Carolina
- Thomas Jefferson Association Building, in Brooklyn, New York
- Jefferson Apartment Building (disambiguation)

== See also ==
- Medical Dental Building (Dallas, Texas), formerly known as the Jefferson Building
- Jeffersonian architecture
- Thomas Jefferson Hotel, a former hotel
- Jefferson Memorial (disambiguation)
- List of places named for Thomas Jefferson
