= James Marshall House =

James Marshall House may refer to:

- James W. Marshall House, Lambertville, New Jersey, listed on the National Register of Historic Places (NRHP)
- James G. Marshall House, Niagara Falls, New York, NRHP-listed
- James E. Marshall House, Sandusky, Ohio, listed on the NRHP in Sandusky, Ohio
- James Marshall House (Shepherdstown, West Virginia), NRHP-listed

== See also ==
- Marshall House (disambiguation)
