= Thomas Marshall House =

Thomas Marshall House may refer to:

- Thomas R. Marshall House, Columbia City, Indiana, listed on the National Register of Historic Places
- Thomas Marshall House (Dayton, Pennsylvania), listed on the NRHP

== See also ==
- Marshall House (disambiguation)
