= Holy Trinity Roman Catholic Church =

Holy Trinity Roman Catholic Church may refer to:

- Holy Trinity Roman Catholic Church (Chicago)
- Holy Trinity Roman Catholic Church (Milwaukee, Wisconsin)
- Holy Trinity Roman Catholic Church (Niagara Falls, New York)
