= Sarah Marshall Hayden =

First female novelist and an author from Illinois

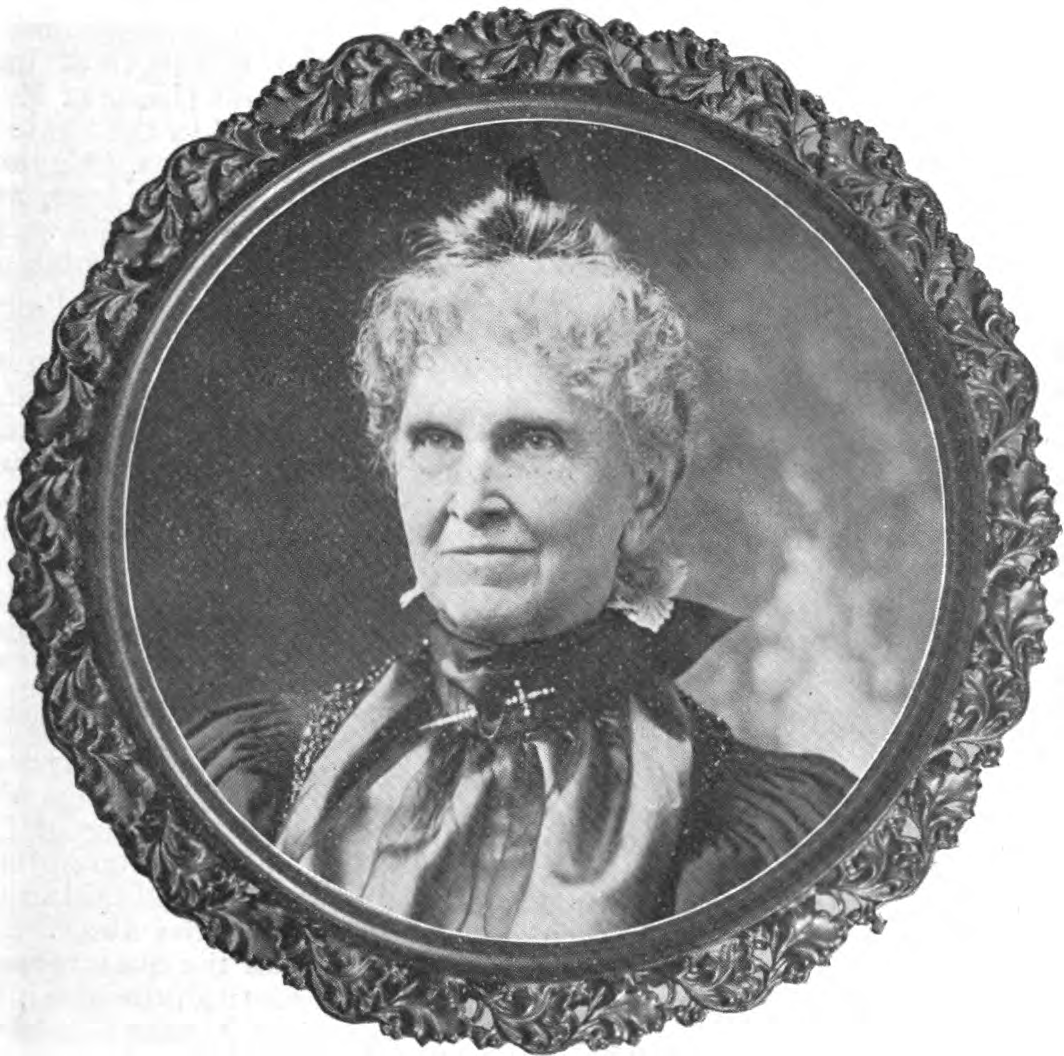
- Born: July 5, 1825; Old Shawneetown
- Died: November 19, 1899; Washington, D.C.
- Occupation: Writer
- Father: John Marshall

Sarah Marshall Hayden (July 5, 1825 – November 19, 1899) was an American author. She was the first female novelist from Illinois.

Sarah Marshall Hayden was born on July 5, 1825 in Shawneetown, Illinois, the daughter of John Marshall, lawyer and member of the Illinois General Assembly. His house was recreated as the John Marshall House Museum.

She was educated at Edgewood Seminary in Sewickley, Pennsylvania. In 1843 she married Judge John James Hayden.

Hayden wrote her first novel at the age of sixteen. It was not published until 1854 when it was published along with its sequel as Early Engagements and Florence (A Sequel) under the pseudonym Mary Frazaer. The story is about Florence, a Southern belle who falls in love with an unambitious minister. John Marshall enlisted the aid of fellow Illinois politician Abraham Lincoln to distribute some copies of the book. Lincoln read a copy of it to his wife Mary Todd Lincoln.

In 1901, John Hayden published a manuscript of a novel she wrote forty years earlier, Mr. Langdon's Mistake. Sarah Hayden also wrote poems, short stories, and articles for numerous publications, including the poem "Going Home", on the death of her son killed in action during the American Civil War.

Sarah Marshall Hayden died on 19 November 1899 in Washington, D.C..

== Bibliography ==
- Early Engagements and Florence (A Sequel) Cincinnati, 1854.
- Mr. Langdon's Mistake. Washington, 1901.
