= Jefferson Apartment Building =

Jefferson Apartment Building may refer to:

- Jefferson Apartment Building (Niagara Falls, New York), listed on the National Register of Historic Places in Niagara County, New York
- Jefferson Apartment Building (Washington, D.C.), listed on the National Register of Historic Places in Washington, D.C.
