= Robert and John McKee Peeples Houses =

Historic houses in Illinois, United States

- Formerly listed on the U.S. National Register of Historic Places
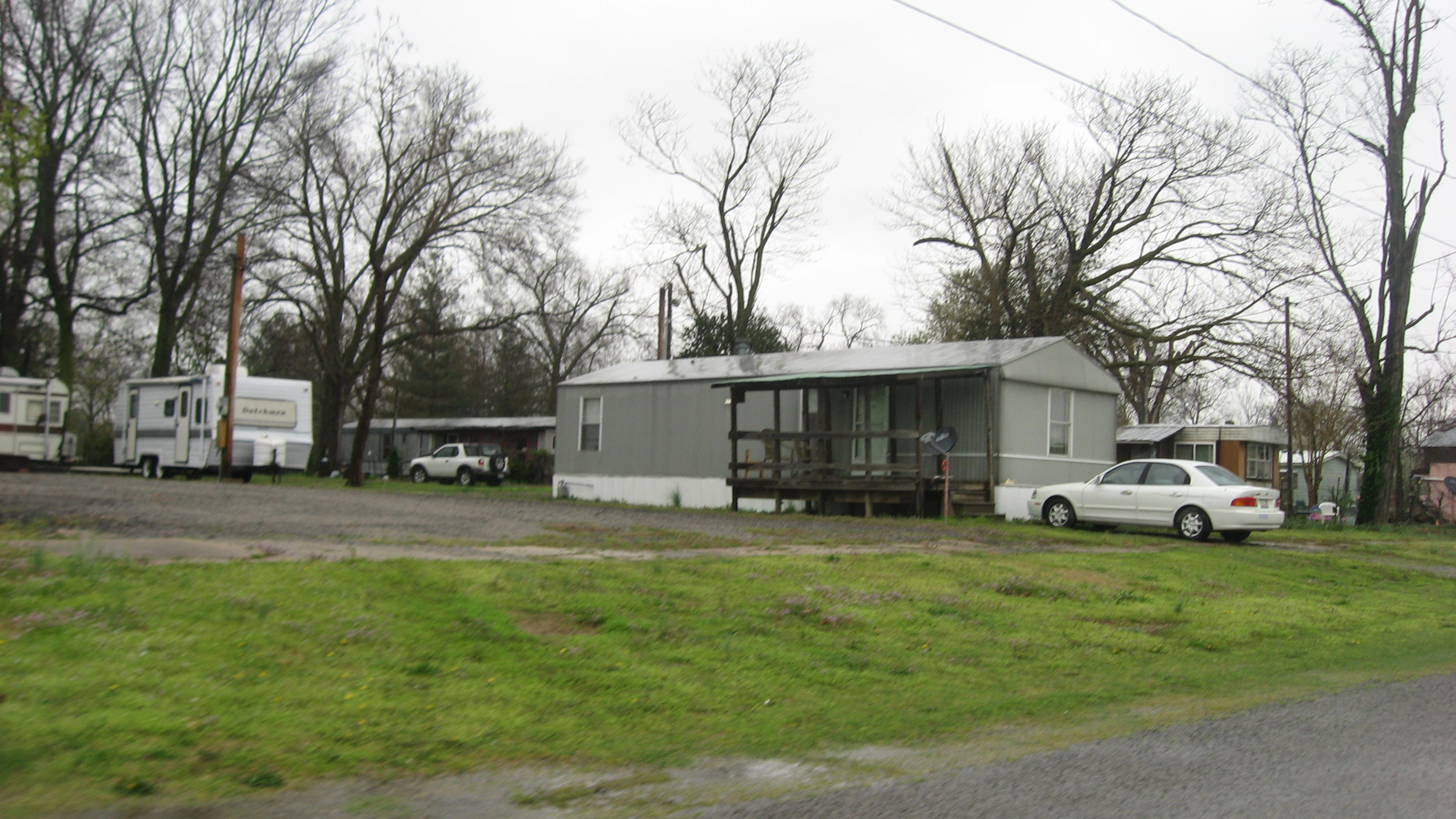
- The site of the houses

- Location within Illinois Location within the United States
- Location: Main St., Old Shawneetown, Illinois
- Coordinates: 37°41′53″N 88°8′2″W
- Area: less than one acre
- Built: 1823, 1846
- Architectural style: Federal
- NRHP reference No.: 83000317

Significant dates
- Added to NRHP: February 24, 1983
- Removed from NRHP: January 6, 2020

The Robert and John McKee Peeples Houses were a pair of adjoining houses in Old Shawneetown, Illinois. The Robert Peeples house was built shortly after statehood (the precise date is uncertain; it may have been 1819 or 1823); it was the third brick building constructed in Old Shawneetown and became the oldest brick building after the earlier two were demolished. Peeples and his wife were natives of western Pennsylvania, but they had become prominent members of the community before building their brick house; Peeples had been chosen as one of the Gallatin County Commissioners in 1817, and his ownership of a local cotton gin allowed him to purchase luxuries such as ornamental doorknobs for his house. The John McKee Peeples House was constructed in 1846 by John McKee Peeples, Robert's son; the two houses were attached by a common roof. The houses were designed in the Federal style and featured parapetted chimneys atop the end walls and facades with three and four bays on the older and newer houses respectively.

The houses were added to the National Register of Historic Places on February 24, 1983. They are no longer standing at their site of construction, and were delisted from the Register in January 2020.
