= James G. Marshall (industrialist) =

American industrialist and inventor

- Born: August 24, 1869; Bellefonte, Pennsylvania, United States
- Died: December 28, 1960; Niagara Falls, New York, United States
- Burial place: Riverdale Cemetery, Lewiston, New York
- Occupation(s): Industrialist, inventor
- Spouse: Lida T. Marshall (d. 1946)
- Children: 2
- Awards: Schoellkopf Medal

James G. Marshall (August 24, 1869 – December 28, 1960) was an American industrialist and inventor. Hailed as the "father of the covered furnace," he pioneered advancements in calcium carbide research and ferroalloys. As a co-founder of chemical company Union Carbide, Marshall held various roles throughout his lifetime, notably serving as general superintendent.

== Early life and education ==
James G. Marshall was born on August 24, 1869 to Joseph Williams Marshall and Mary Allen Marshall, on the family farm located in Buffalo Run Valley near Bellefonte, Pennsylvania. He was the youngest among 10 siblings, with four brothers and five sisters. His mother was the daughter of a Scottish covenanter, while his father's ancestors were among the earliest settlers in America. Marshall is a direct descendant, seven generations removed, of John Brown of Priesthill.

Marshall graduated from Bellefonte Academy in 1891. He earned a B. Sc. from Pennsylvania State University in 1895, followed by an electrical engineering degree from the same institution in 1902. He taught elementary school from 1889 to 1890. Marshall relocated to Niagara Falls, New York, where he observed that the newspapers were brimming with stories about beginning the development of electric power, with Niagara Falls prominently featured in those narratives, in 1896.

== Career ==
Marshall started his career in 1896 as an electrical engineer at the Acetylene Light, Heat, & Power Co. of Niagara Falls, which he co-founded and which later became Union Carbide. In 1910, he pioneered the covered furnace system at Union Carbide, earning him the title of the "father of the covered furnace". He was promoted to superintendent of the Niagara Falls plant in 1913 and became district superintendent of the Welland, Ontario, and Niagara Falls plants in 1917.

In 1921, Marshall became general superintendent of operations for Union Carbide, overseeing facilities throughout North America, including in Niagara Falls, Ontario, Michigan, Virginia, and West Virginia. He oversaw the construction of the Union Carbide plant in Norway and traveled through Europe, Asia, Australia and South America, as well as the United States. He remained in this role until he retired in 1939. Following his retirement, Marshall served as a consulting engineer for the company.

Marshall, described as a "sentinel of industrial safety," championed safety and better working conditions throughout his career. He is credited as a pioneer of plant safety programs used nationwide. Niagara Falls historian Tom Yots notes that he was recognized for his contributions to advancing employee benefits and is credited with devising a work shift system that ensured employees had adequate rest periods and a fair distribution of workload during holidays and other special times of need.

Marshall held many patents in the electro-metallurgical field. He is credited for making two fundamental raw materials, acetylene and carbon monoxide, commercially accessible to the chemical industry.

== Awards and distinctions ==
In 1937, Marshall was awarded the Jacob F. Schoellkopf Medal from the Western New York chapter of the American Chemical Society for his contributions to the calcium carbide and ferroalloy industries.

In 1953, Marshall received from the Niagara Falls Council of Social Agencies an Honorary Life Membership for Community Service.

In 1956, Marshall received a Distinguished Alumnus Medal from his alma mater, Pennsylvania State University, for "conspicuous achievement in personal and professional life, and community service".

== Personal life ==
Marshall married Lida T. Marshall in 1898. They had two daughters. Lida died in 1946.

=== Civic work and philanthropy ===
Marshall participated in several civic and charitable organizations, including the Beeman Clinic, Niagara Falls Historical Society, Old Fort Niagara Association, Council of Social Agencies, and the YMCA. He served as a board member of the Niagara Falls Chamber of Commerce from 1933 to 1936, vice president from 1933 to 1935, director from 1941 to 1943, and president from 1941 to 1943.

Marshall served as an elder at the First Presbyterian Church in Niagara Falls from 1917 onwards.

In 1957, Marshall proposed turning the Edward Dean Adams power plant into an "electrical hall of fame" to preserve its history and that of industries it powered. Despite gathering wide support from various organizations, including historical societies, the project faced financial challenges and remained unrealized.

=== James G. Marshall House ===
Marshall resided in the Park Place Historic District in Niagara Falls, New York. In 2004, his home was listed on the National Register of Historic Places. It is also listed on the New York State Register of Historic Places. In 1994, it opened as a bed and breakfast.

== Death ==
Marshall died on December 28, 1960 at Memorial Hospital in Niagara Falls.
