= Shawnee Township, Gallatin County, Illinois =

Shawnee Township
- Township
- Location in Gallatin County

- Gallatin County's location in Illinois
- Coordinates: 37°44′59″N 88°06′18″W
- Country: United States
- State: Illinois
- County: Gallatin
- Established: November 5, 1890

Area
  - Total: 24.33 sq mi (63.0 km^{2})
  - Land: 23.54 sq mi (61.0 km^{2})
  - Water: 0.79 sq mi (2.0 km^{2}) 3.24%
- Elevation: 335 ft (102 m)

Population (2020)
  - Total: 168
  - Density: 7.14/sq mi (2.76/km^{2})
- Time zone: UTC-6 (CST)
  - Summer (DST): UTC-5 (CDT)
- ZIP codes: 62984
- FIPS code: 17-059-69069

Shawnee Township is one of ten townships in Gallatin County, Illinois, USA. As of the 2020 census, its population was 168 and it contained 97 housing units.

== Geography ==
According to the 2021 census gazetteer files, Shawnee Township has a total area of 24.33 square miles (63.01 km^{2}), of which 23.54 square miles (60.97 km^{2}) (or 96.76%) is land and 0.79 square miles (2.05 km^{2}) (or 3.24%) is water.

=== Cities, towns, villages ===
- Old Shawneetown

=== Cemeteries ===
The township contains Immaculate Conception Cemetery.

=== Major highways ===
- Illinois Route 13

=== Rivers ===
- Ohio River

=== Lakes ===
- Big Lake
- Black Lake
- Fehrer Lake
- Fish Lake

== Demographics ==
As of the 2020 census there were 168 people, 47 households, and 28 families residing in the township. The population density was 6.91 inhabitants per square mile (2.67/km^{2}). There were 97 housing units at an average density of 3.99 per square mile (1.54/km^{2}). The racial makeup of the township was 94.64% White, 0.00% African American, 0.00% Native American, 0.00% Asian, 0.00% Pacific Islander, 1.19% from other races, and 4.17% from two or more races. Hispanic or Latino of any race were 1.19% of the population.

There were 47 households, out of which 27.70% had children under the age of 18 living with them, 29.79% were married couples living together, 12.77% had a female householder with no spouse present, and 40.43% were non-families. 40.40% of all households were made up of individuals, and 25.50% had someone living alone who was 65 years of age or older. The average household size was 1.85 and the average family size was 2.36.

The township's age distribution consisted of 19.5% under the age of 18, 2.3% from 18 to 24, 12.6% from 25 to 44, 35.6% from 45 to 64, and 29.9% who were 65 years of age or older. The median age was 53.6 years. For every 100 females, there were 135.1 males. For every 100 females age 18 and over, there were 133.3 males.

The median income for a household in the township was $20,536. Males had a median income of $210,893 versus $21,250 for females. The per capita income for the township was $37,085. About 39.3% of families and 42.5% of the population were below the poverty line, including 88.2% of those under age 18 and 26.9% of those age 65 or over.

Historical population
Census	Pop.	Note	%±
2000	355		—
2010	230		−35.2%
2020	168		−27.0%
U.S. Decennial Census

== School districts ==
- Gallatin Community Unit School District 7

== Political districts ==
- Illinois's 19th congressional district
- State House District 118
- State Senate District 59
