= Hazard H. Sheldon House =

Historic house in New York, United States

- U.S. National Register of Historic Places
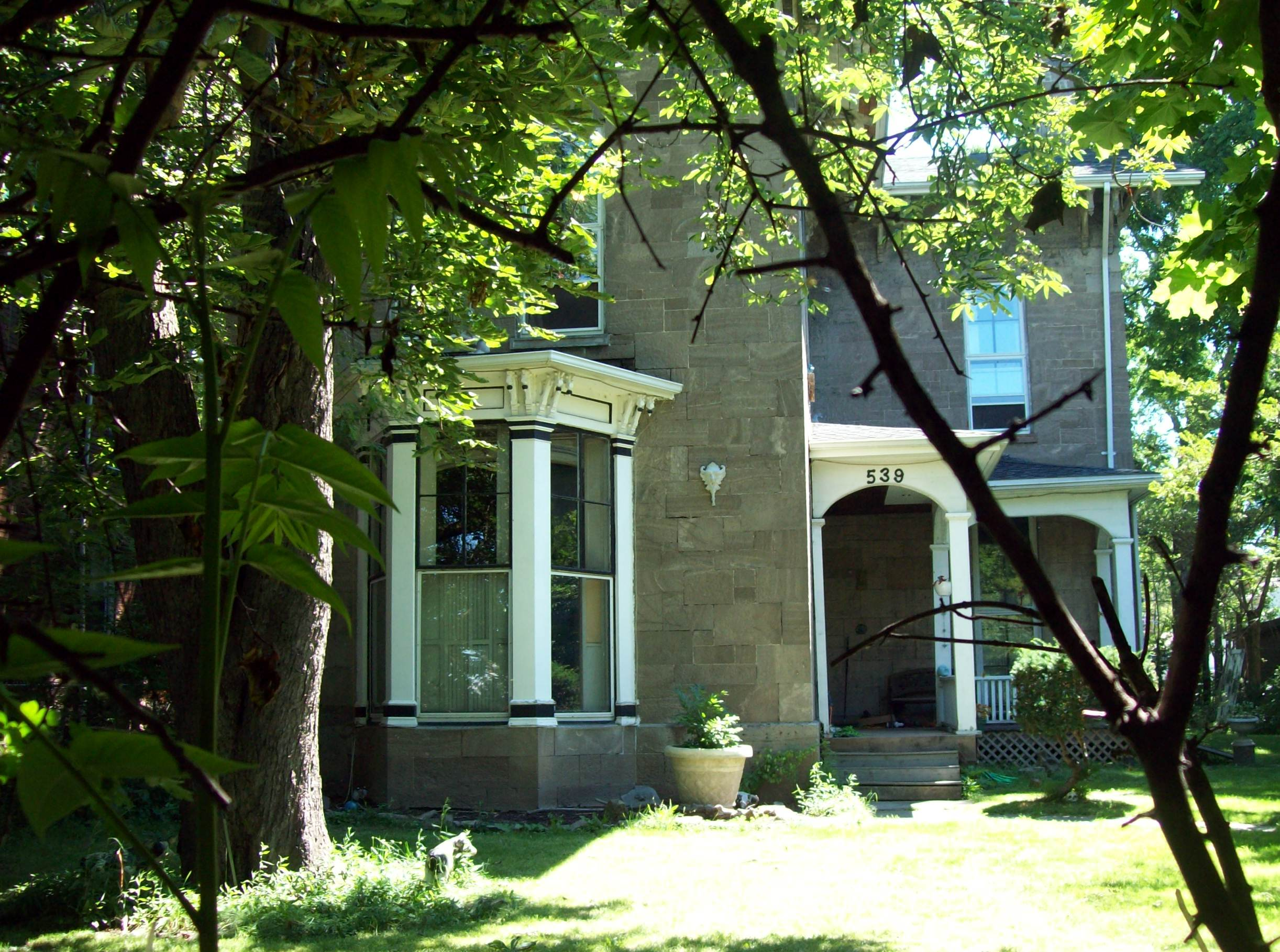
- Hazard H. Sheldon House, July 2011

- Location within New York Location within the United States
- Location: 539 4th St., Niagara Falls, New York
- Coordinates: 43°5′30.5298″N 79°3′27.9462″W
- Area: less than one acre
- Built: c. 1857
- Architectural style: Italianate
- NRHP reference No.: 11000275
- Added to NRHP: May 11, 2011

Hazard H. Sheldon House, also known as the Sheldon-Benham House, is a historic home located at Niagara Falls in Niagara County, New York. It was built about 1857 and is a 1 1/2-story, L-shaped dwelling built of native gorge stone in the Italian Villa style. It has a low pitched gable roof with deep overhanging eaves. From 1857 to 1900, it was the home of Hazard H. Sheldon (1821-1900), an important figure in the early civic affairs of Niagara Falls.

It was listed on the National Register of Historic Places in 2011.
