= Ballard–Marshall House =

Historic house in Virginia, United States

- U.S. National Register of Historic Places
- Virginia Landmarks Register
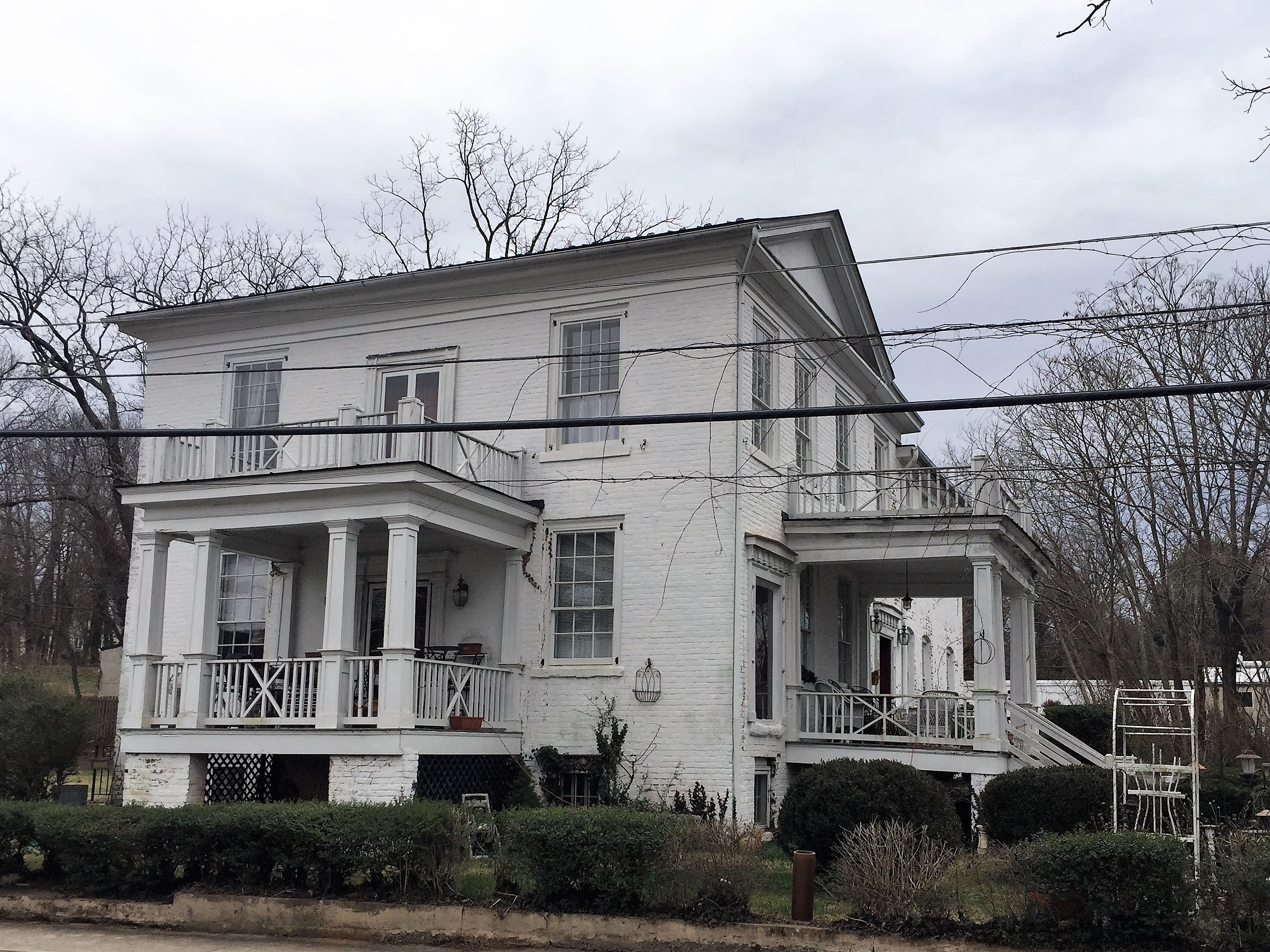

- Location within Virginia Location within the United States
- Location: 158 E. Main St., Orange, Virginia
- Coordinates: 38°14′43″N 78°6′31″W
- Area: 0.5 acres (0.20 ha)
- Built: 1832, c. 1900, 1910
- Architectural style: Colonial Revival, Early Republic, Jeffersonian Classicism
- NRHP reference No.: 88002138
- VLR No.: 275-0001

Significant dates
- Added to NRHP: October 27, 1988
- Designated VLR: June 21, 1988

Ballard–Marshall House, also known as Marshall House, is a historic home located at Orange, Orange County, Virginia. It was built in 1832, and is a two-story, three-bay, brick late Federal Virginia townhouse dwelling. It is an example of an urban house form influenced by the Jeffersonian Classical style. A two-story rear addition was added about 1900, and the original front and side porches were replaced with ones in the Colonial Revival style in 1910. The house was converted to apartments in 1934–1935, and renovated in 1986–1988.

It was listed on the National Register of Historic Places in 1988.
