= St. Mary's Nurses' Residence =

- U.S. National Register of Historic Places
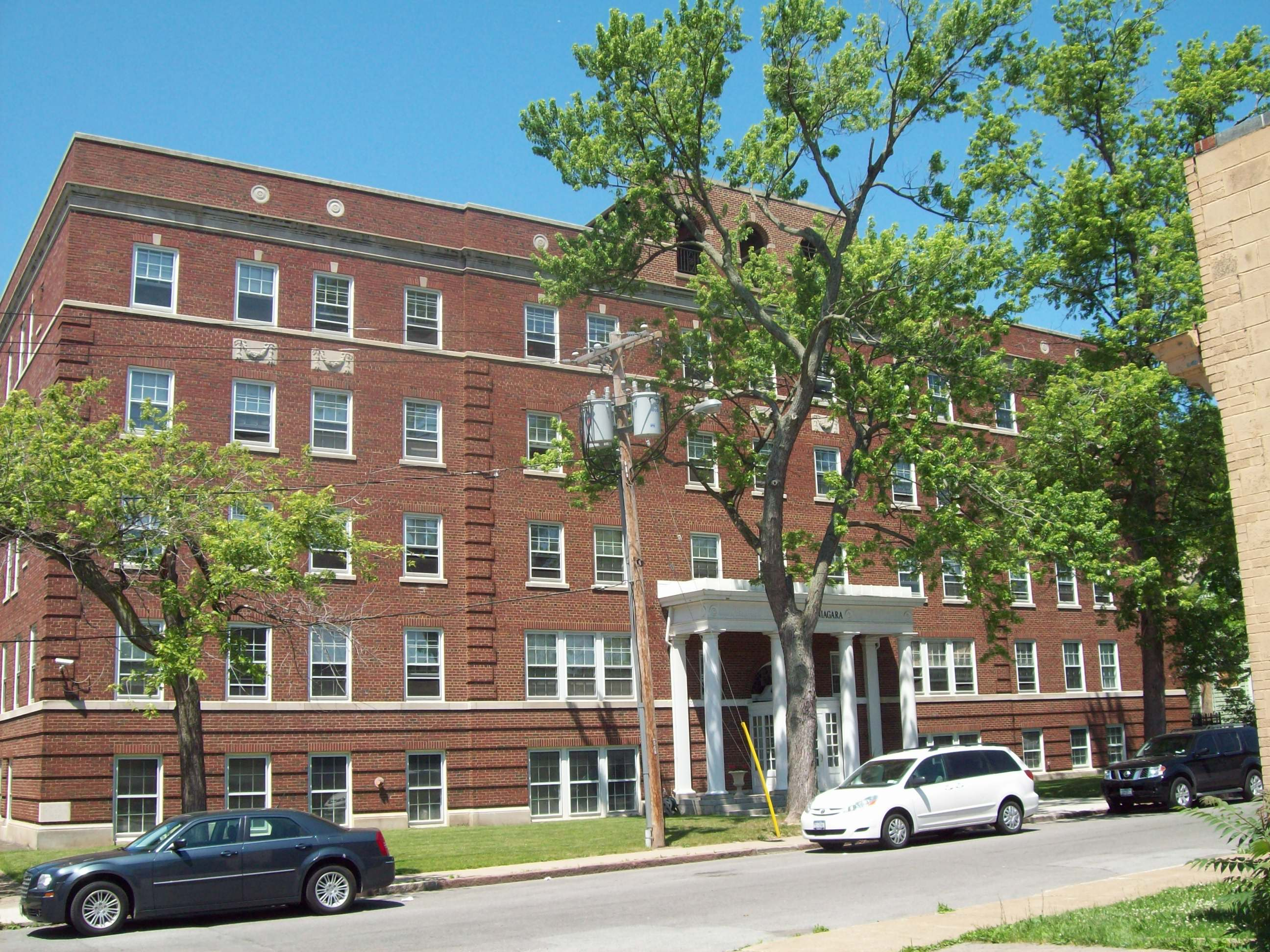
- St. Mary's Nurses' Residence, June 2009

- Location within New York Location within the United States
- Location: 542 6th St., Niagara Falls, New York
- Coordinates: 43°5′35″N 79°3′21″W
- Built: 1928
- Architect: Kirkpatrick & Cannon; James G. Davidson
- Architectural style: Classical Revival
- NRHP reference No.: 04000711
- Added to NRHP: July 16, 2004

St. Mary's Nurses' Residence is a historic residence hall located at Niagara Falls in Niagara County, New York. It was constructed in 1928 as a Diploma School for nurses affiliated with the Mount St. Mary's Hospital, operated by the Sisters of St. Francis. After being abandoned for 20 years, it was redeveloped as "Carolyn's House"; a transitional home and job-training center for homeless women and their children operated by the YWCA of Niagara.

It was listed on the National Register of Historic Places in 2004.
