= Chilton Avenue–Orchard Parkway Historic District =

Historic district in New York, United States

- U.S. National Register of Historic Places
- U.S. Historic district
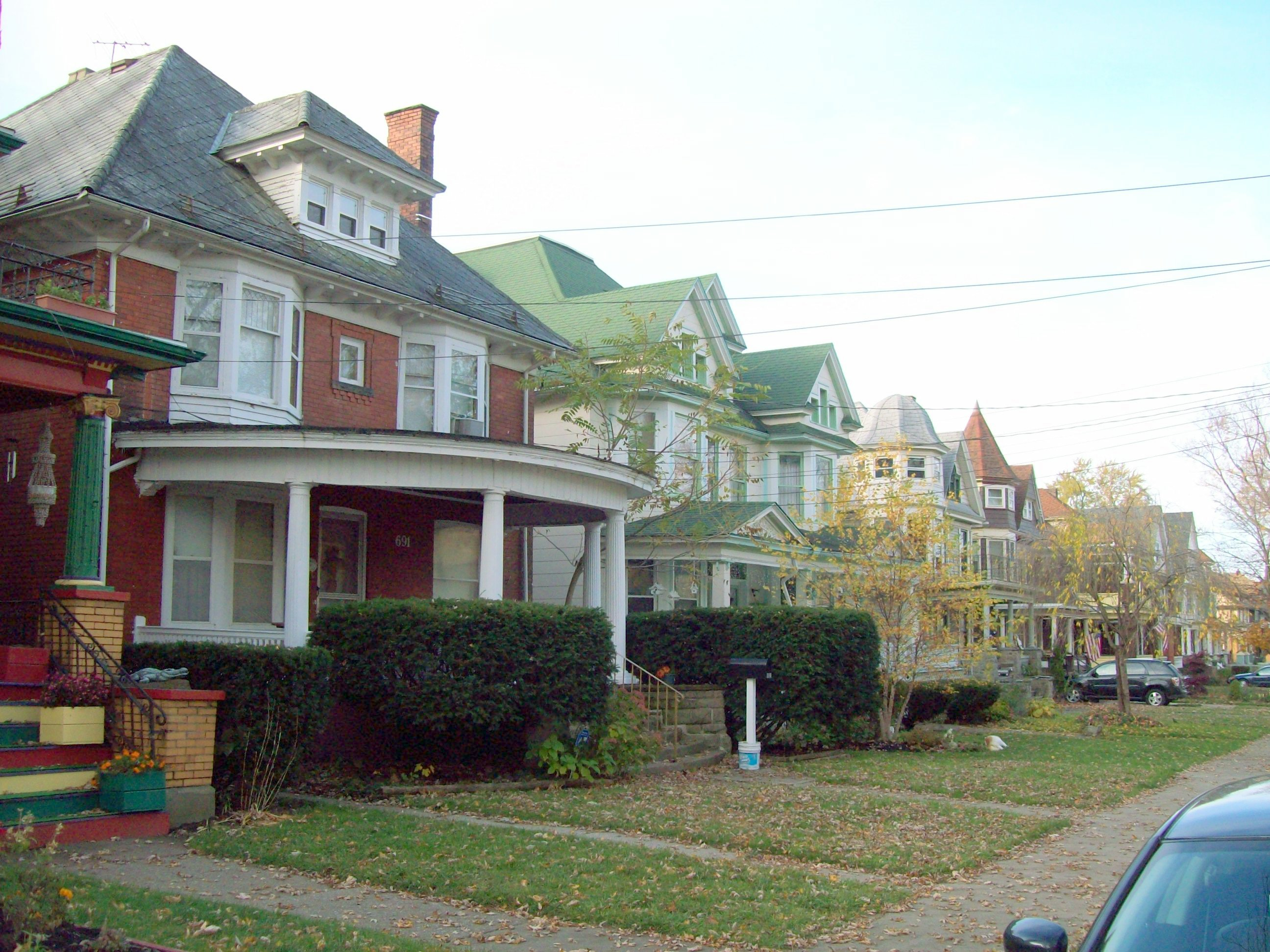
- Chilton Avenue–Orchard Parkway Historic District, November 2010

- Location within New York Location within the United States
- Location: Portions of Chilton Ave and Orchard Pkwy, Niagara Falls, New York
- Coordinates: 43°06′02″N 79°03′17″W
- Area: 14.69 acres (5.94 ha)
- Built: c. 1899-1941
- Architectural style: Queen Anne, Colonial Revival, Tudor Revival, and Bungalow / Craftsman
- NRHP reference No.: 10000771
- Added to NRHP: August 23, 2010

Chilton Avenue–Orchard Parkway Historic District is a national historic district in Niagara Falls in Niagara County, New York. It encompasses 103 contributing buildings in a residential district built up between about 1899 and 1941. The dominant architectural styles are Queen Anne, Colonial Revival, Tudor Revival, and Bungalow / American Craftsman.

It was listed on the National Register of Historic Places in 2010.
