= Camp Mather-Camp Logan =

- U.S. National Register of Historic Places
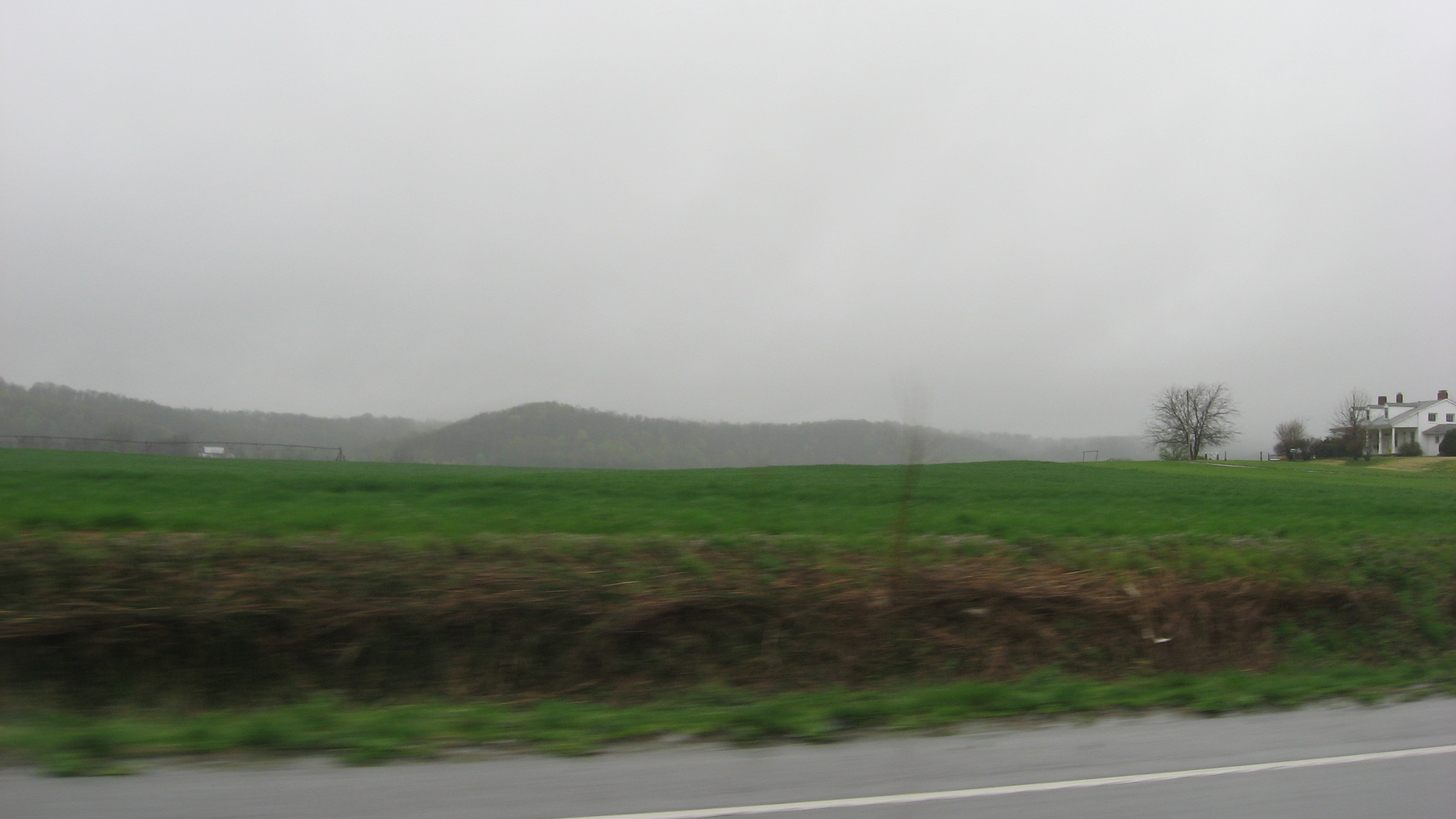
- Overview of the camp

- Location within Illinois Location within the United States
- Location: 10765 IL 13, Shawneetown, Illinois
- Coordinates: 37°42′24″N 88°10′42″W
- Area: 196 acres (79 ha)
- Architectural style: Mid 19th Century Revival
- MPS: Caught in the Middle: The Civil War on the Lower Ohio River MPS
- NRHP reference No.: 98000983
- Added to NRHP: August 6, 1998

Camp Mather-Camp Logan is a Civil War campsite located along Illinois Route 13 outside of Shawneetown, Illinois. The campsite was Henry and Mary Eddy's farm and summer home; Henry died in 1849, leaving Mary in charge of the farm at the outset of the war. The Union Army began camping on the property in December 1861, when the 56th Illinois Infantry occupied the land; the camp was named Camp Mather for Illinois adjutant general Thomas S. Mather. The camp, part of the Department of the Ohio, was one of two Union campsites near Shawneetown, the other being Camp Katie Yates. The farm's summer home became the camp hospital and was used to treat measles patients during an outbreak in the winter of 1861-62 that killed eight soldiers. By the fall of 1862, when the 87th Illinois Infantry occupied the camp, the camp was known as Camp Logan. The soldiers of the 87th Infantry went without pay for several months while awaiting assignment and transport at the camp, and two companies nearly mutinied due to the situation. The 87th Infantry left the camp for Memphis, Tennessee, in March 1863, marking the end of Union occupation of the site.

The campsite was added to the National Register of Historic Places on August 6, 1998.
