= Johann Williams Farm =

Historic house in New York, United States

- U.S. National Register of Historic Places
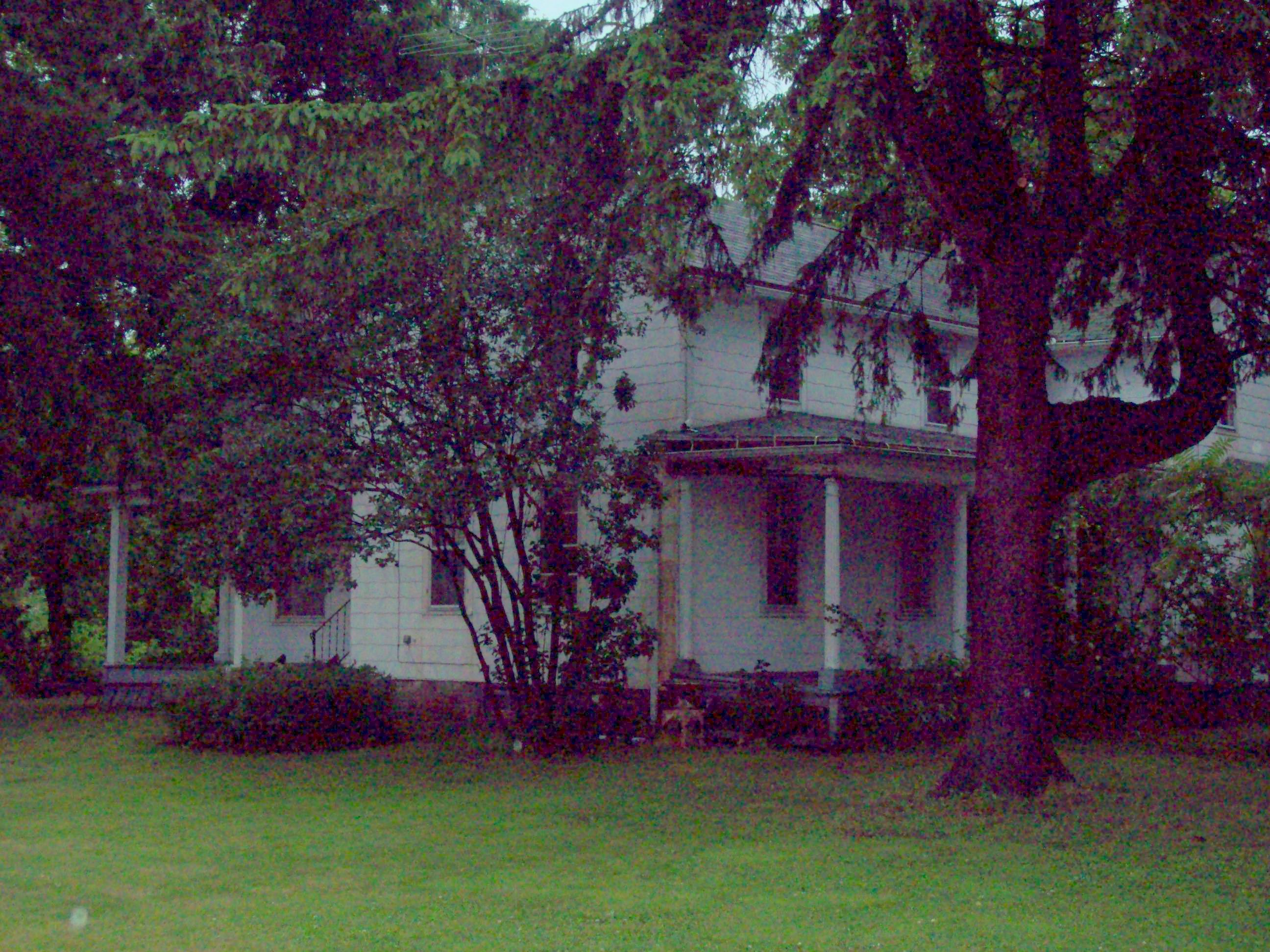
- Johann Williams Farm, June 2009

- Location within New York Location within the United States
- Location: 10831 Cayuga Dr., Niagara Falls, New York
- Coordinates: 43°5′29″N 78°56′36″W
- Built: 1845
- Architectural style: Half timbered construction
- NRHP reference No.: 80002730
- Added to NRHP: January 10, 1980

Johann Williams Farm is a historic farmhouse and related outbuildings located at Niagara Falls in Niagara County, New York. It is a two-story frame dwelling built originally in the mid-1840s by Johann Williams, an immigrant to the area from Bergholtz, Prussia. The original square, half timber structure was added to during the late 19th and early 20th centuries. The property includes a number of notable farm outbuildings. When originally nominated, it was the last farm operating within the Niagara Falls city limits.

It was listed on the National Register of Historic Places in 1980.

It is a half-mile north of Love Canal.
