= Holley-Rankine House =

Historic house in New York, United States

- U.S. National Register of Historic Places
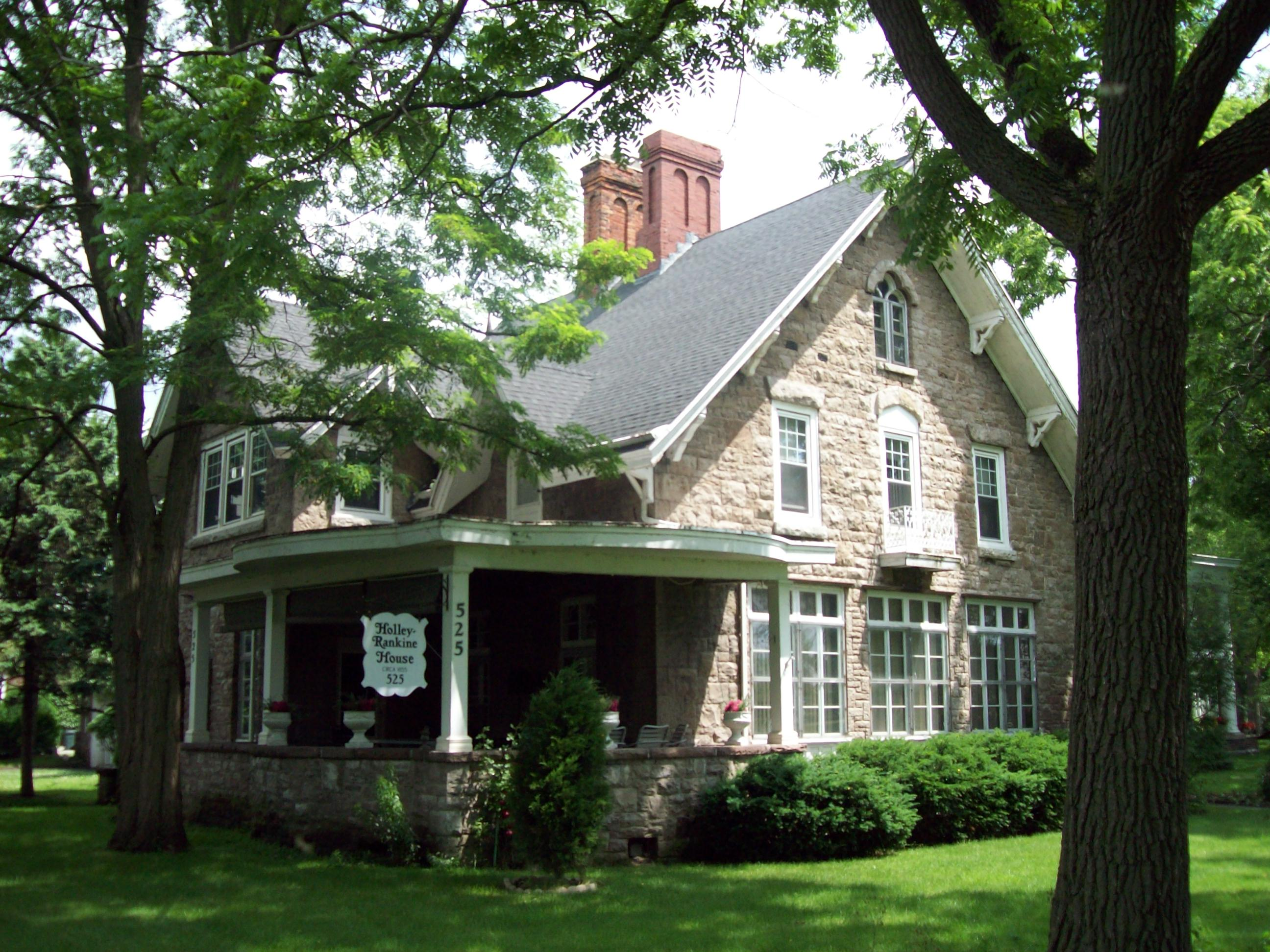
- Holley-Rankine House, June 2009

- Location within New York Location within the United States
- Location: 525 Riverside Dr., Niagara Falls, New York
- Coordinates: 43°4′53″N 79°3′20″W
- Built: 1855
- Architectural style: Gothic Revival
- NRHP reference No.: 79003793
- Added to NRHP: October 04, 1979

Holley-Rankine House is a historic home located at Niagara Falls in Niagara County, New York. It is a two-and-a-half-story Gothic Revival cottage built about 1855 by prominent local resident George Washington Holley (1810–1897). After his death it became the home of William B. Rankine (1858–1905), who was largely responsible for constructing the Adams Power Plant. It is located overlooking the Niagara River, just above the American Falls. It is now operated as a bed and breakfast.

It was listed on the National Register of Historic Places in 1979.
