= Niagara Falls School District Administration Building =

- U.S. National Register of Historic Places
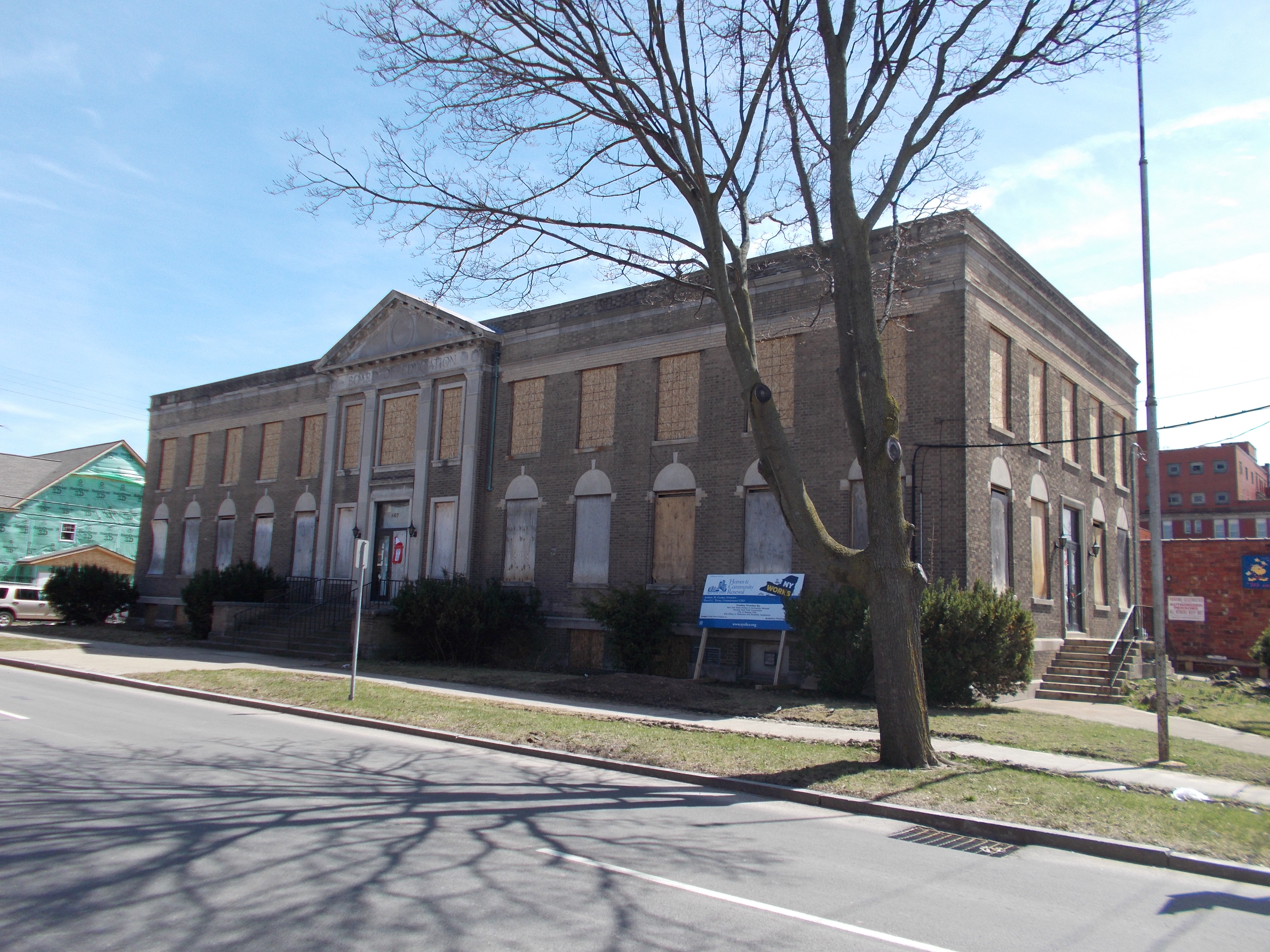
- Niagara Falls School District Administration Building, April 2015

- Location within New York Location within the United States
- Location: 607 Walnut Ave., Niagara Falls, New York
- Coordinates: 43°05′34″N 79°03′19″W
- Area: Less than 1 acre (0.40 ha)
- Built: 1927-1928
- Architect: Charles F. Obenhack
- Architectural style: Classical Revival
- NRHP reference No.: 14001020
- Added to NRHP: December 10, 2014

Niagara Falls School District Administration Building is a historic government building located at Niagara Falls, Niagara County, New York. It was built in 1927–1928, and is a two-story, 14-by-5-bay, buff-colored brick building with Classical Revival detailing. It has a flat roof, limestone trim, a partially exposed finished basement, and rear ell. It features a pedimented central entry portico and arched first floor windows. It remained in use by the city schools until 2007.

It was listed on the National Register of Historic Places in 2014.
