= Paul Marshall House =

Historic house in New York, United States

- U.S. National Register of Historic Places
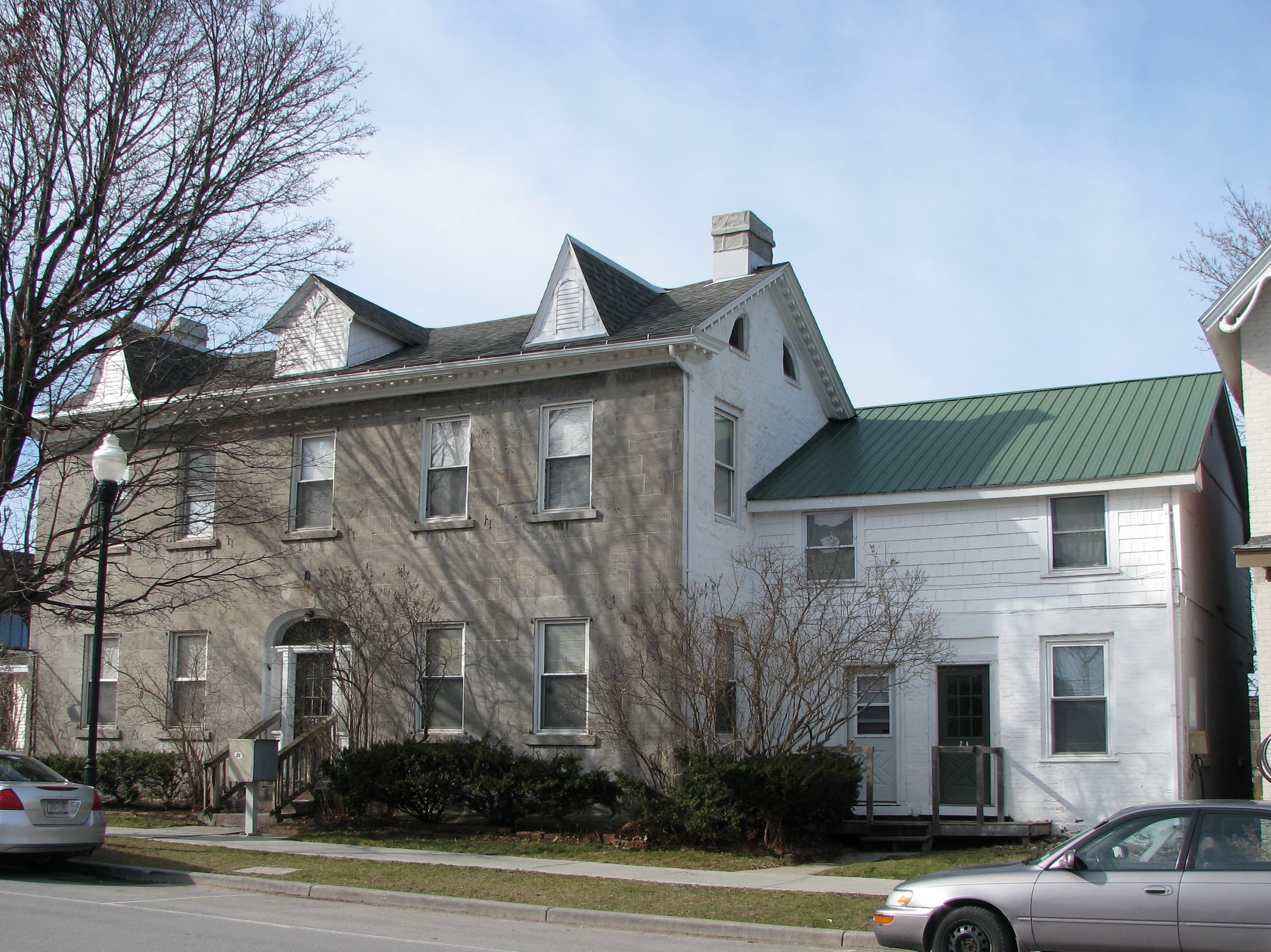
- Paul Marshall House, March 2012

- Location within New York Location within the United States
- Interactive map showing the location of Paul Marshall House
- Location: 24-26 Cornelia St., Plattsburgh, New York
- Coordinates: 44°41′59″N 73°27′9″W
- Area: less than one acre
- Built: 1828
- Architectural style: Federal
- MPS: Plattsburgh City MRA
- NRHP reference No.: 82001108
- Added to NRHP: November 12, 1982

Paul Marshall House is a historic home located at Plattsburgh in Clinton County, New York. It was built about 1828 and is a 2 1/2-story, stone-and-brick structure on a stone foundation in the Federal style. It features a dressed stone facade and corbelled stone chimneys.

It was listed on the National Register of Historic Places in 1982.
