= Shawneetown Bank State Historic Site =

- State Bank
- U.S. National Register of Historic Places
- Illinois State Historic Site
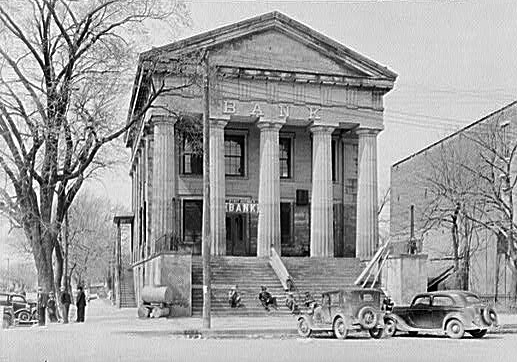
- Main Street front in 1937

- Location within Illinois Location within the United States
- Location: Corner of Main St. and Washington St., Old Shawneetown, Illinois
- Coordinates: 37°41′48″N 88°8′7″W
- Area: 0.7 acres (0.28 ha)
- Built: 1839–41
- Architectural style: Greek Revival
- NRHP reference No.: 72000459
- Added to NRHP: April 19, 1972

The Shawneetown Bank State Historic Site is an historic bank building in Old Shawneetown, Illinois, and is the oldest structure in Illinois built specifically as a bank. A Greek Revival structure built in 1839–1841 in what was then called Shawneetown, it was the home of a series of banks into the 20th century. The building is brick with a limestone front façade.

== Background ==
The Illinois Historic Preservation Agency called Old Shawneetown "the gateway to the Illinois Territory" and "the commercial center of early Illinois". The area was a profitable salt mining area, and a federal land office was established in the village in 1812. Settlers sought credit to buy land from the federal land office, and local business sought paper money to ease business transactions.

Four privately owned banks were chartered by the Illinois territorial legislature in 1816, and the first bank established in the Illinois Territory was by John Marshall, and named the Bank of Illinois or Bank of Illinois at Shawneetown. The authorization act was approved on December 28, 1816 by territorial governor Ninian Edwards, with a charter to operate until January 1, 1837 and provisions for the Territory and future State of Illinois to participate in the bank. At the very beginning, John Marshall operated the bank out of his home.

The bank suspended operations in 1823 or 1824, after Illinois had become a state. However, at the recommendation of Governor Joseph Duncan, the legislature passed a new act on February 12, 1835, extending the charter to January 1857 and using the name State Bank of Illinois at Shawneetown. An act of March 4, 1837 increased the authorized capital stock from $300,000 to $1,400,000, of which $1,000,000 was reserved for the State and $400,000 for private investors. The Panic of 1837 caused holders of banknotes to turn them in at such a rate that the bank could not deliver specie on demand, and the bank suspended specie payments; to avoid a charter provision forcing liquidation on suspension for 60 days, the state legislature made indefinite suspension legal twice, once in July 1837 and once in 1839. Nonetheless, the prosperity of the mid-1830s boosted the confidence of bankers.

== Building and banks ==
The bank building of historic note was erected in 1839 and 1840, at a cost of $80,000, on the north corner of Main Street and what was then called Main Cross Street. The cornerstone was laid on August 3, 1839, and the bank building opened in 1841.

This was not the most expensive of the transactions of the State Bank of Illinois, however: In the same period, it had loaned $80,000 to the state to complete the fifth state capitol, then under construction in Springfield. It also loaned another $200,000 to the commissioners of public works, on the promise of $500,000 in pledged securities, but neither the $500,000 pledge nor the $200,000 loan was ever paid. The bank finally failed in June 1842, with a banknote circulation of $1,300,000 (equivalent to $40,500,000 in 2024) still outstanding. At liquidation, the bank's real estate lot, including the building, was evaluated as $83,336.74.

The bank building was sold to Joel A. Matteson for $15,000. In 1853, then-governor Matteson started the State Bank of Illinois in the same building, under a free banking act. At the dawn of the American Civil War, Matteson feared that the Confederate forces might be able to overrun the area on short notice, and so closed the bank and sold the building, for only $6,500, to Thomas S. Ridgway. Ridgway took up residence in the building, and also, with John McKee Peeples, founded The First National Bank of Shawneetown in the building in 1865; both Ridgway's residence and the First National Bank were still in the building as of the mid-1870s. Thomas S. Ridgway remained president of the First National Bank until his death in 1897. His family continued to live in the bank until 1913.

The building housed numerous financial institutions through the 1930s.

== State ownership ==
The site was deeded to the state.

The Shawneetown Bank was added to the National Register of Historic Places in 1972 under the name State Bank.

Some restoration was completed in the 1970s but much remained to be done, and the building was on the Landmarks Illinois list of the top 10 most endangered historical sites in 2009.

The bank building was not available for tours as of 2017 and as of 2020.
