= Marshall Memorial Hall =

- U.S. National Register of Historic Places
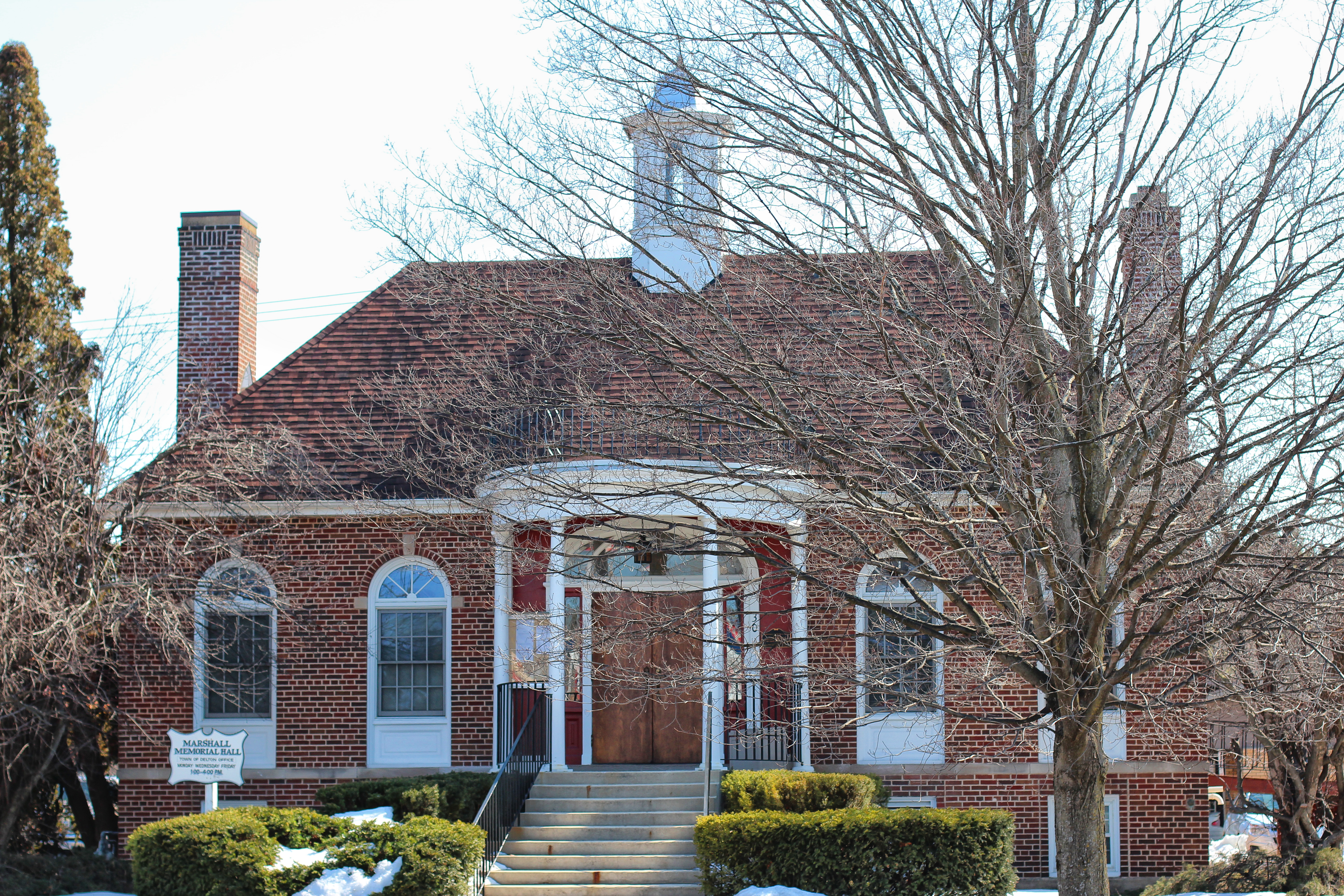

- Location within Wisconsin
- Location: 30 Wisconsin Dells Pkwy. S., Lake Delton, Wisconsin
- Coordinates: 43°35′20″N 89°47′37″W
- Area: less than one acre
- Architect: Edward Tough
- Architectural style: Georgian Revival
- NRHP reference No.: 93000264
- Added to NRHP: April 1, 1993

Marshall Memorial Hall is a historic building at 30 Wisconsin Dells Parkway South in Lake Delton, Wisconsin. The town of Delton had the building constructed in 1928 to serve as a government office building, community center, and town library. Roujet D. Marshall, an early Delton resident and justice on the Wisconsin Supreme Court, bequeathed the money for the building, and it was named in his honor. Architect Edward Tough of Madison designed the Georgian Revival building. The one-story brick building's design includes a rounded entrance portico supported by Tuscan columns, arched double-hung windows, and a hip roof with an octagonal lantern and two brick chimneys. The building continues to house town offices and is one of the few surviving buildings in Lake Delton that predates the commercial development of the Wisconsin Dells area as a major tourist destination.

The building was added to the National Register of Historic Places on April 1, 1993.
