= Marshall House (Little Rock, Arkansas) =

Historic house in Arkansas, United States

- U.S. National Register of Historic Places
- U.S. Historic district – Contributing property
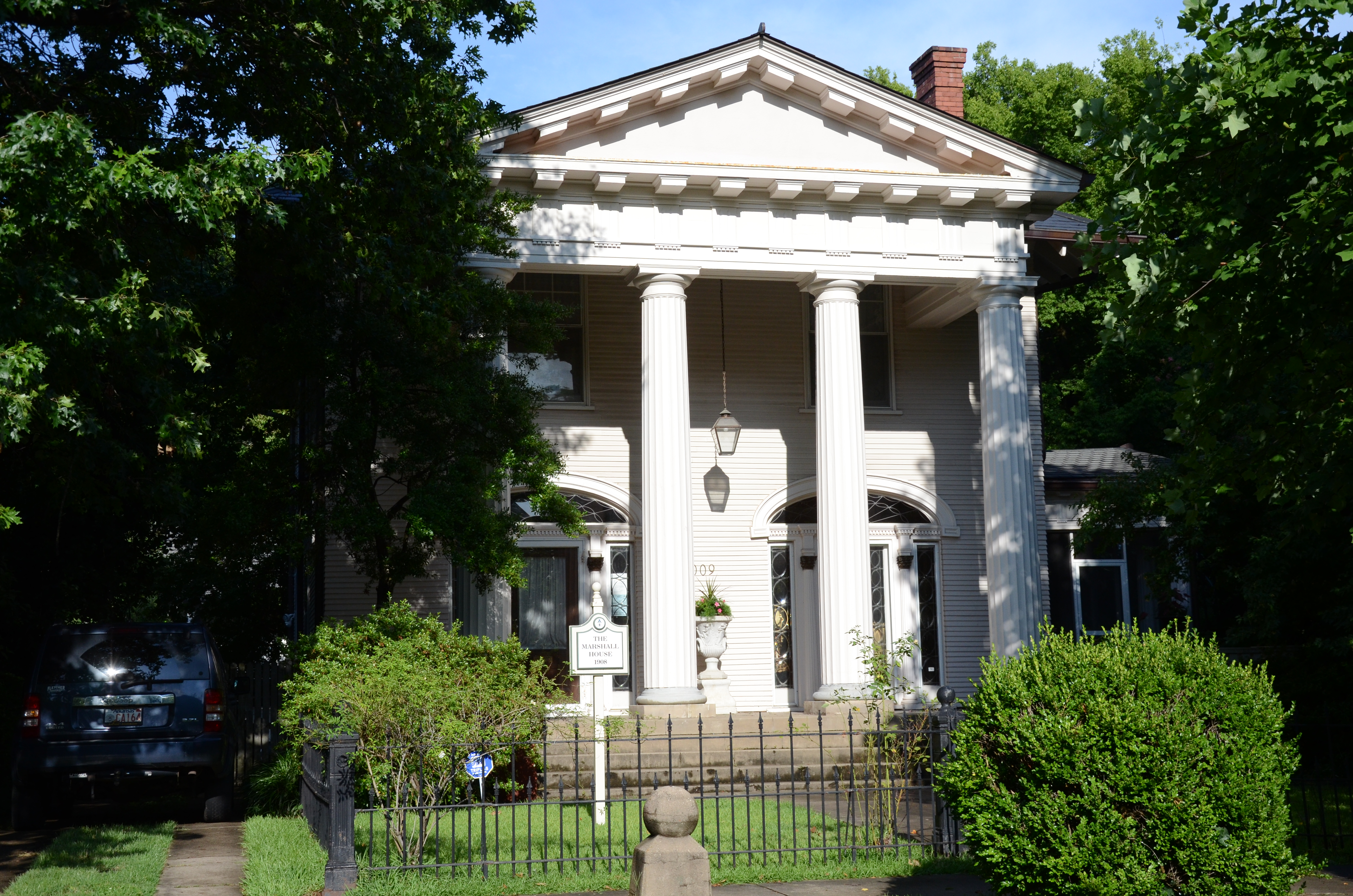

- Location within Arkansas Location within the United States
- Location: 2009 Arch St., Little Rock, Arkansas
- Coordinates: 34°43′45″N 92°16′46″W
- Built: 1908
- Architect: Charles L. Thompson
- Part of: Governor's Mansion Historic District (1988 enlargement) (ID88000631)
- MPS: Thompson, Charles L., Design Collection TR
- NRHP reference No.: 82000907

Significant dates
- Added to NRHP: December 22, 1982
- Designated CP: May 19, 1988

The Marshall House is a historic house at 2009 Arch Street in Little Rock, Arkansas. It is a two-story wood-frame house, covered by a hip roof with extended eaves showing exposed rafter ends. A temple-front portico projects from the center of the main facade, with massive fluted Doric columns supporting a fully pedimented and modillioned gable. It was built in 1908, from designs by Charles L. Thompson.

The house was added to the National Register of Historic Places in 1982. It was selected as the most representative home built in 1908 in this region as part of the nationwide competition sponsored by the National Association of Realtors in honor of its Diamond Jubilee 75th Anniversary.

== See also ==
- National Register of Historic Places listings in Little Rock, Arkansas
