= Former Niagara Falls High School =

- U.S. National Register of Historic Places
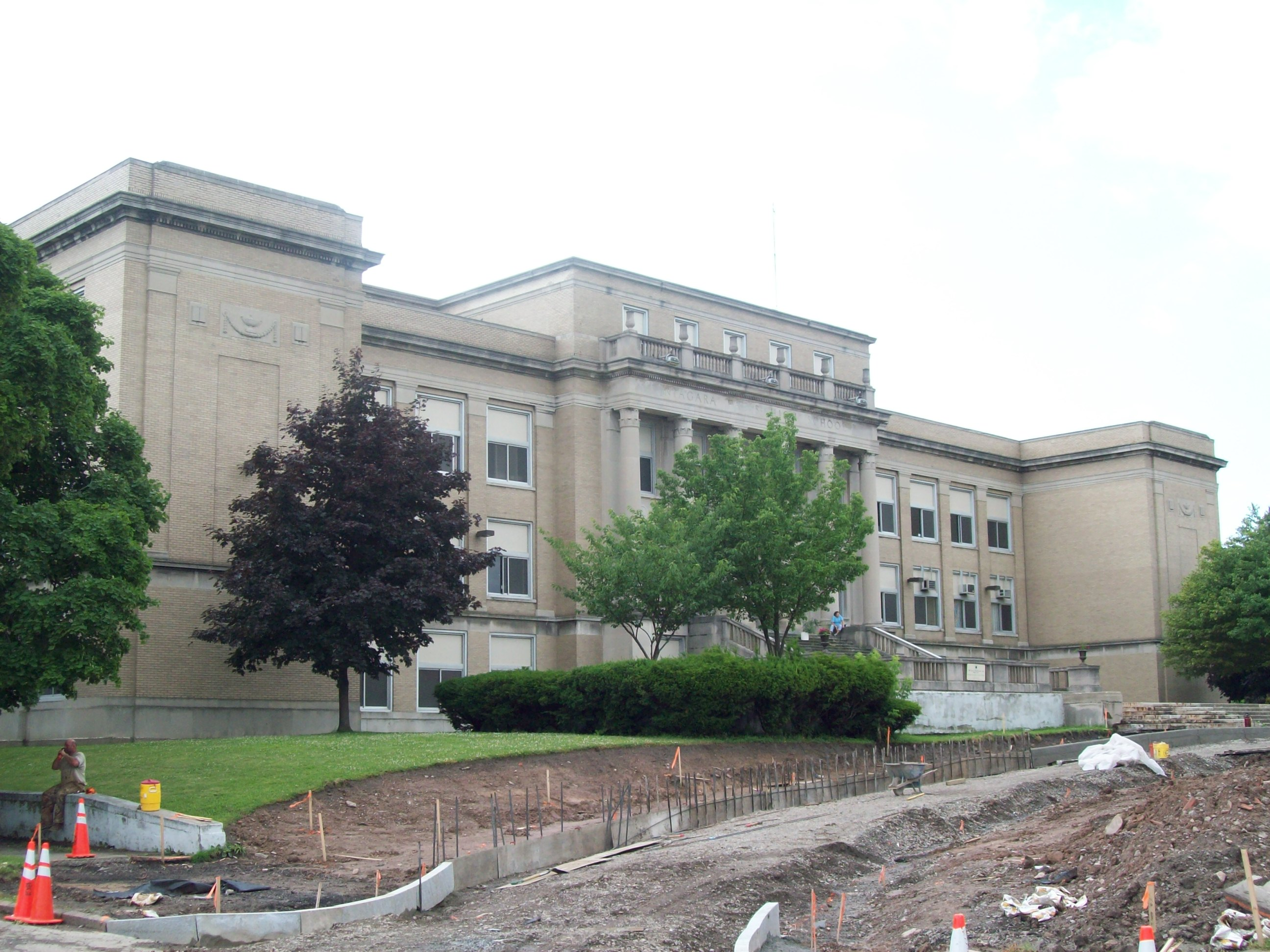
- Former Niagara Falls High School, June 2009

- Location within New York Location within the United States
- Location: 1201 Pine Ave., Niagara Falls, New York
- Coordinates: 43°5′36″N 79°2′8″W
- Built: 1888
- Architect: Larke, Simon, & Obenhack, C.F.; William B. Ittner
- Architectural style: Classical Revival
- NRHP reference No.: 01001507
- Added to NRHP: January 24, 2002

Former Niagara Falls High School is a historic high school located at Niagara Falls in Niagara County, New York, USA. It was built in 1888 and added to the existing gymnasium structure, and designed by local architect Simon Larke, who also designed the James G. Marshall House. The original structure is in the Neoclassical revival style. An addition was constructed in 1963.

The building was threatened with demolition in late 2000, but was spared and is currently used as the Niagara Arts & Cultural Center. The multi-arts center features over 60 artist studios, two galleries, two theaters, a certified sound stage and movie production facility, the Niagara Falls High School alumni center and a café and gift shop.

It was listed on the National Register of Historic Places in 2002.
