= Jefferson Memorial (disambiguation) =

Jefferson Memorial is an American landmark structure in Washington, D.C.

Jefferson Memorial may also refer to:

- Jefferson Memorial Forest, a forest in Kentucky
- Jefferson National Expansion Memorial or Gateway Arch National Park, a park in St. Louis, Missouri
- Jefferson Memorial (St. Louis), a landmark of St. Louis
- Jefferson Memorial Cemetery, a cemetery in Pittsburgh, Pennsylvania, that includes the grave of John D. Kelly
- Jefferson Memorial Hospital, a hospital in Missouri
