= Park Place Historic District (Niagara Falls, New York) =

Historic district in New York, United States

- U.S. National Register of Historic Places
- U.S. Historic district
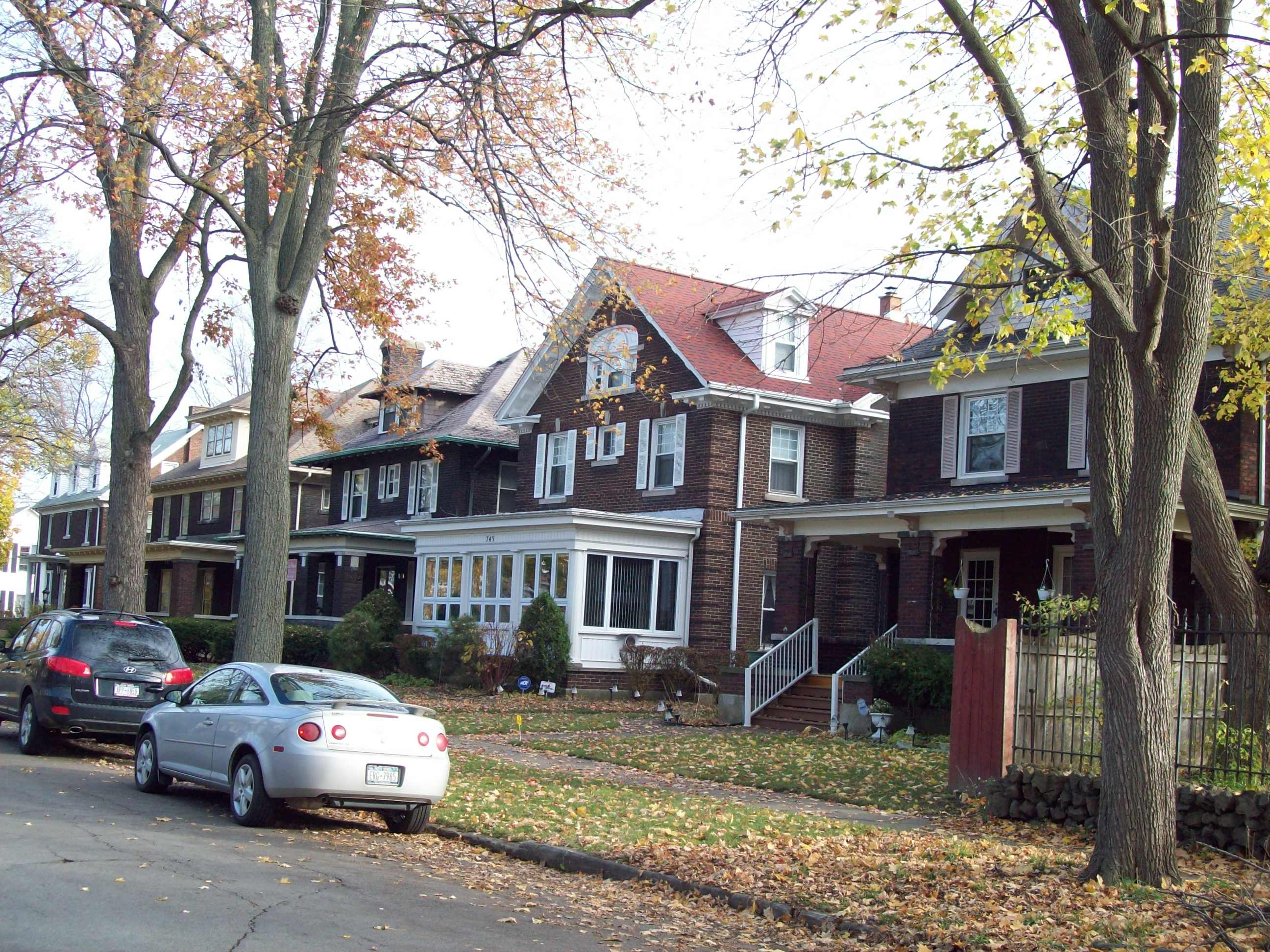
- Park Place Historic District, November 2010

- Location within New York Location within the United States
- Location: Park Place, portions of Pine Ave., 4th St., Main St., Whirlpool St., and Cedar Ave. Niagara Falls, New York
- Coordinates: 43°5′44″N 79°3′25″W
- Area: 17.14 acres (6.94 ha)
- Built: 1885-1928
- Architectural style: Italianate, Queen Anne, Colonial Revival, and Arts and Crafts
- NRHP reference No.: 10000809
- Added to NRHP: October 1, 2010

Park Place Historic District is a national historic district located at Niagara Falls in Niagara County, New York. The district was listed on the National Register of Historic Places in 2010. It encompasses 89 contributing buildings, one contributing site, one contributing structure, and one contributing object. It is principally a residential district built between 1885 and 1928. The dominant architectural styles are Italianate, Queen Anne, Colonial Revival, and Arts and Crafts. Within the district is a park with a prominent obelisk, known as "The Cenotaph," and a notable stone fence. Located within the district is the separately listed James G. Marshall House.
