= James G. Marshall House =

Historic house in New York, United States

- U.S. National Register of Historic Places
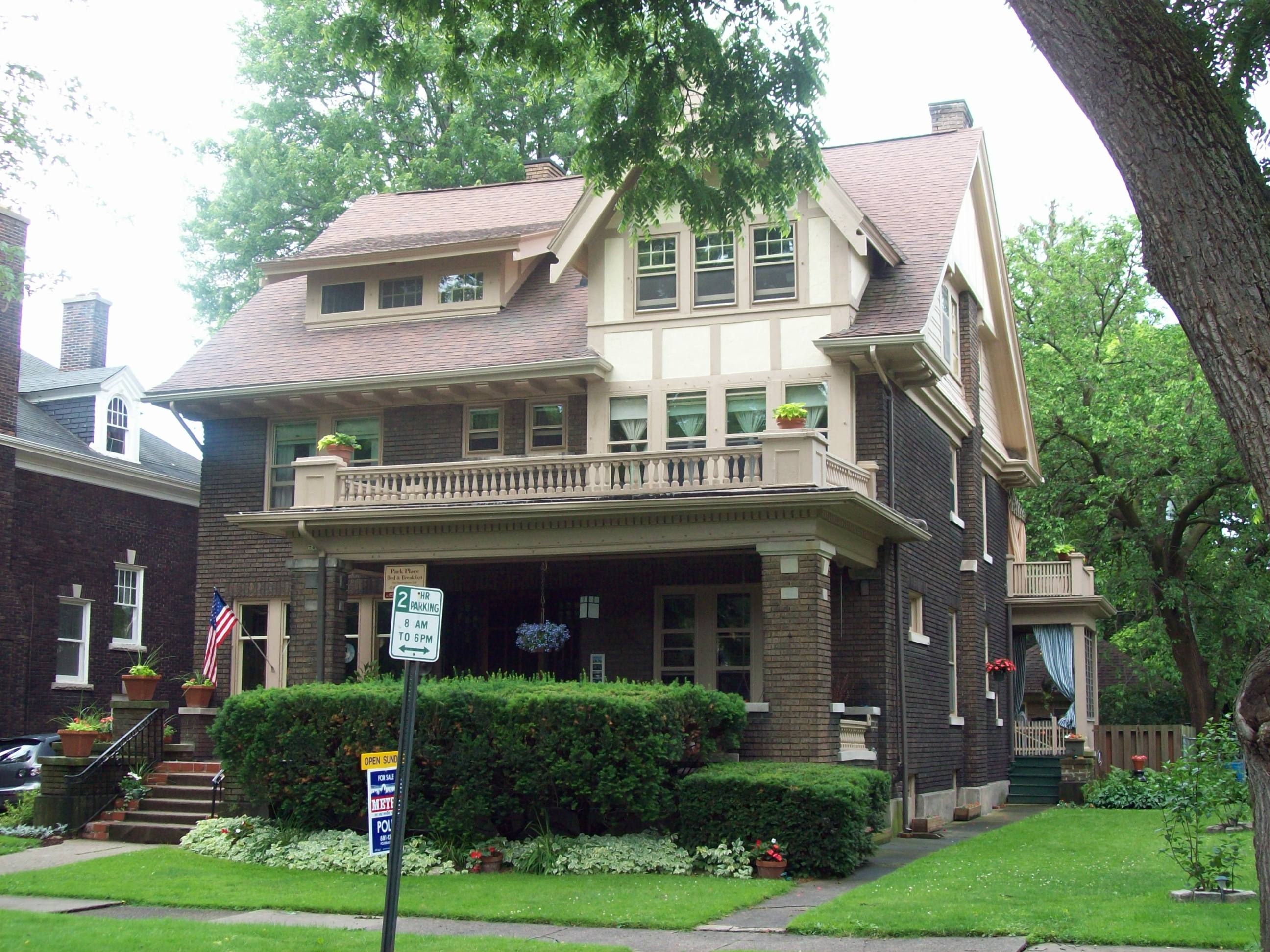
- James G. Marshall House, June 2009

- Location within New York Location within the United States
- Location: 740 Park Place, Niagara Falls, New York
- Coordinates: 43°5′52″N 79°4′11″W
- Built: 1913
- Architect: Larke, Simon and Russell
- Architectural style: Bungalow/Craftsman
- NRHP reference No.: 04000709
- Added to NRHP: July 16, 2004

James G. Marshall House is a historic home located at Niagara Falls in Niagara County, New York. It is a three-story Arts and Crafts style dwelling built in 1913 by the industrialist and inventor James G. Marshall (1869–1960). It was designed by prominent local architect Simon Larke, who also designed the Former Niagara Falls High School. In April 1994, it opened as a bed and breakfast.

It was listed on the National Register of Historic Places in 2004. It is located within the Park Place Historic District, listed on the National Register of Historic Places in 2010.

Larke was also the architect for Temple Beth El, 720 Ashland Avenue.
