= Old Shawneetown, Illinois =

- Village
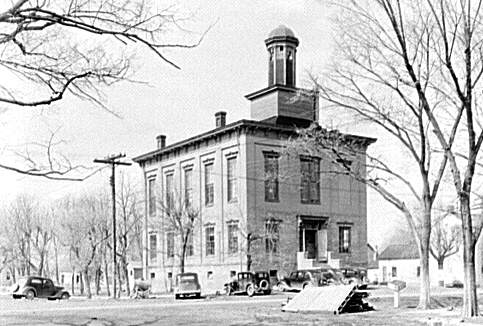
- Old Shawneetown Court House in 1937

- Location of Old Shawneetown in Gallatin County, Illinois.
- Coordinates: 37°41′50″N 88°08′20″W
- Country: United States
- State: Illinois
- County: Gallatin
- Township: Shawnee

Area
  - Total: 0.51 sq mi (1.32 km^{2})
  - Land: 0.51 sq mi (1.32 km^{2})
  - Water: 0 sq mi (0.00 km^{2})
- Elevation: 348 ft (106 m)

Population (2020)
  - Total: 113
  - Density: 221.5/sq mi (85.51/km^{2})
- Time zone: UTC-6 (CST)
  - Summer (DST): UTC-5 (CDT)
- ZIP code: 62984
- Area code: 618
- FIPS code: 17-55756
- GNIS ID: 2399569

Old Shawneetown is a village in Shawnee Township, Gallatin County, Illinois, United States. As of the 2020 census, the village had a population of 113, down from 193 at the 2010 census. Located along the Ohio River, Shawneetown served as an important United States government administrative center for the Northwest Territory. The village was devastated by the Ohio River flood of 1937. The village's population was moved several miles inland to New Shawneetown.

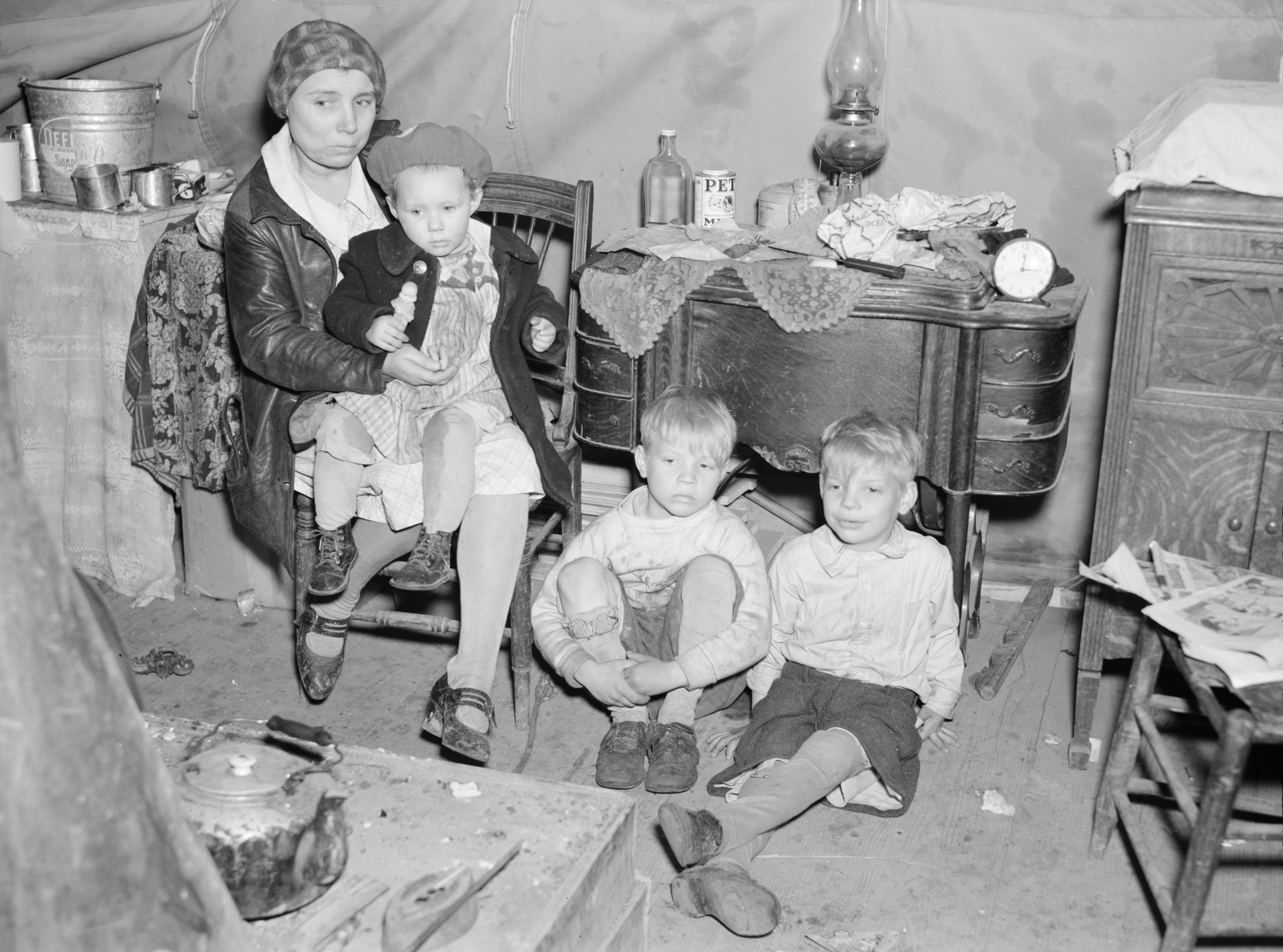
1937 flood Shawneetown Illinois refugees

== History ==
At least one record suggests that a village was established here by the Pekowi Shawnee led by Peter Chartier about 1758. In early November 1803, Lewis and Clark are believed to have stopped at Old Shawneetown on their way to Fort Massac, just down the Ohio River.

After the American Revolution, Shawneetown served as an important United States government administrative center for the Northwest Territory. Shawneetown and Washington, D.C., share the distinction of being the only towns chartered by the United States government.

Old Shawneetown is the site of the first bank chartered in Illinois, in 1816. Originally in a log cabin, it was replaced in 1822 with a brick structure (only the second one in the town) now known as the John Marshall House.

Local legend states that the Shawneetown Bank refused to buy the first bonds issued by the city of Chicago on the grounds that no city located that far from a navigable river could survive.

Another historic bank building, the Bank of Illinois, was constructed in 1839–41 to house the offices of the Bank of Illinois at Shawneetown. It later housed numerous other financial institutions before it was closed in the 1930s. This fine example of Greek Revival architecture survives as the Shawneetown Bank State Historic Site.

Residents long remembered the visit by Gilbert du Motier, Marquis de Lafayette of France to the city on May 8, 1825, as a high point for the early community's social history.

After the Great Flood of 1937, many residents moved to the current location of Shawneetown. The old courthouse was torn down and a new Gallatin County Courthouse was constructed in 1939.

== Geography ==
Old Shawneetown is located in southeastern Gallatin County on the northwest bank of the Ohio River. Illinois Route 13 passes through the village. To the east it crosses the Shawneetown Bridge over the Ohio, becoming Kentucky Route 56 and leading 13 miles (21 km) to Morganfield, Kentucky. To the west, IL 13 leads 3 miles (5 km) to Shawneetown, the Gallatin County seat, and 23 miles (37 km) to Harrisburg.

According to the 2021 census gazetteer files, Old Shawneetown has a total area of 0.51 square miles (1.32 km^{2}), all land.

In 2019, Old Shawneetown was featured on PBS NewsHour in a segment on communities subjected to repeated flooding. Because of the town's historically flood-prone location, it is prohibitively difficult to insure, and some researchers have recommended a total relocation of the remaining residents as a preventative policy.

== Demographics ==
Historical population
Census	Pop.	Note	%±
1830	446		—
1840	1,900		326.0%
1850	1,764		−7.2%
1860	1,115		−36.8%
1870	1,309		17.4%
1880	1,851		41.4%
1890	1,570		−15.2%
1900	1,698		8.2%
1910	1,863		9.7%
1920	1,368		−26.6%
1930	1,440		5.3%
1940	1,357		−5.8%
1950	578		−57.4%
1960	433		−25.1%
1970	342		−21.0%
1980	396		15.8%
1990	356		−10.1%
2000	278		−21.9%
2010	193		−30.6%
2020	113		−41.5%
U.S. Decennial Census

As of the 2020 census there were 113 people, 40 households, and 21 families residing in the village. The population density was 221.57 inhabitants per square mile (85.55/km^{2}). There were 65 housing units at an average density of 127.45 per square mile (49.21/km^{2}). The racial makeup of the village was 92.92% White, 1.77% from other races, and 5.31% from two or more races. Hispanic or Latino of any race were 1.77% of the population.

There were 40 households, out of which 32.5% had children under the age of 18 living with them, 17.50% were married couples living together, 15.00% had a female householder with no husband present.

Below the poverty line was 75% of those under the age of 18 and 8.3% of those age 65 or over.

== Notable people ==
- Claudia Cassidy, music and drama critic for the Chicago Tribune
- Peter Chartier, Shawnee Indian chief
- Sarah Marshall Hayden, first female novelist in Illinois
- Robert G. Ingersoll, orator
- Michael Kelly Lawler, Union Army officer
- John Alexander McClernand, Union Army general and U.S. congressman
- John McLean, U.S. senator and congressman
- William W. Wilshire, U.S. congressman
- Bluford Wilson, Union Army officer
- James Harrison Wilson, Union Army general

== See also ==
- Illinois Salines
- List of cities and towns along the Ohio River
