= Holy Trinity Roman Catholic Church Complex (Niagara Falls, New York) =

Historic church in New York, United States

- U.S. National Register of Historic Places
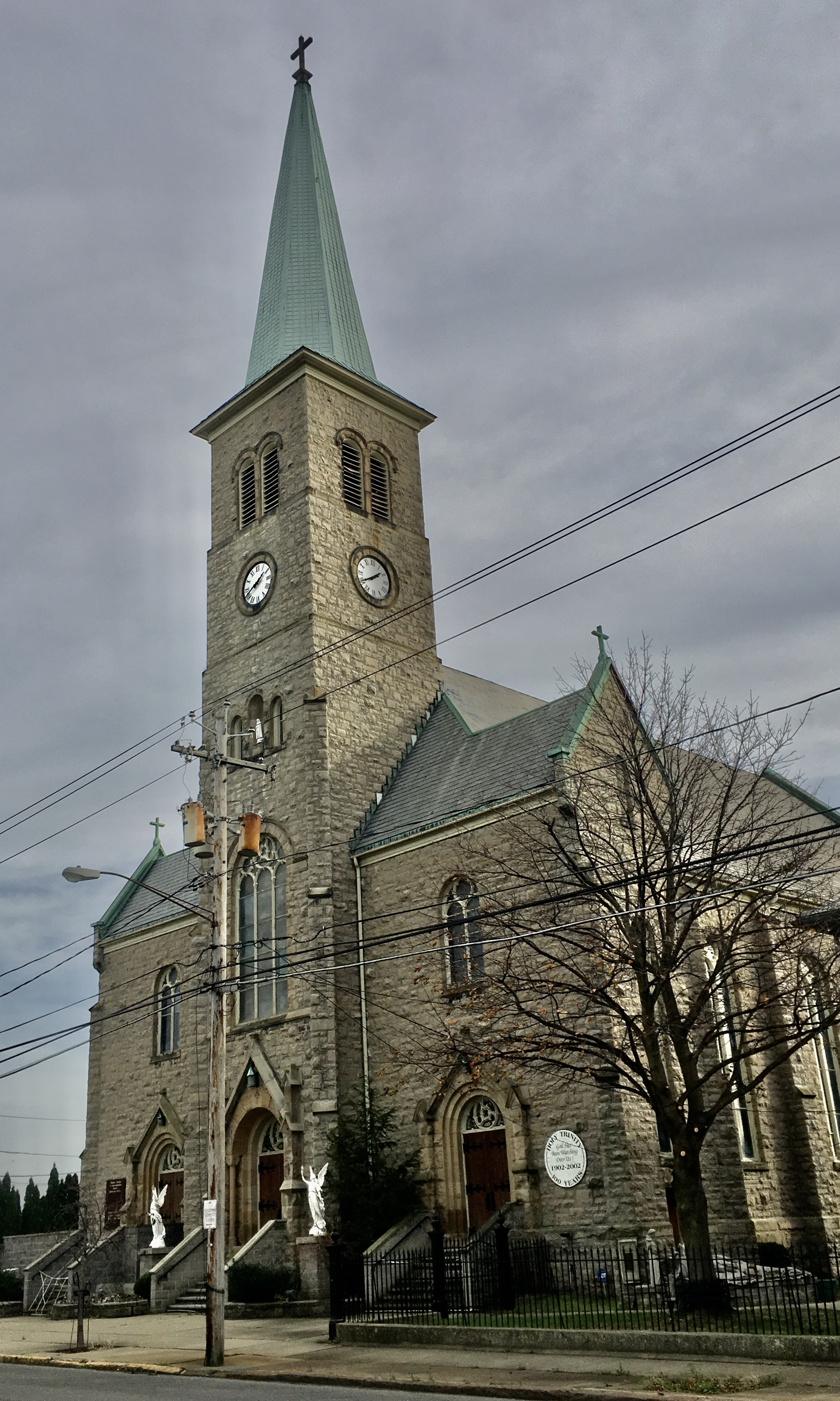
- Holy Trinity Roman Catholic Church, November 2020

- Location within New York Location within the United States
- Location: 1419 Falls St., Niagara Falls, New York
- Coordinates: 43°5′12.67″N 79°2′38.54″W
- Area: 1.5 acres (0.61 ha)
- Built: 1906
- Architect: Schmill and Gould
- Architectural style: Romanesque Revival
- NRHP reference No.: 10000334
- Added to NRHP: June 11, 2010

Holy Trinity Roman Catholic Church Complex is a historic Polish, Roman Catholic and former church located at Niagara Falls in Niagara County, New York within the Diocese of Buffalo.

== Description ==
The complex was constructed between 1906 and 1914 and consists of the church, school, rectory, convent, and garage. The church is built of random course stone walls and has a steeply pitched, slate shingled gable roof. It features a central facade tower with spire and Romanesque Revival detailing.

The complex was purchased by a not-for-profit group, Niagara Heritage of Hope and Service, in 2009. It was listed on the National Register of Historic Places in 2010.

== Gallery ==
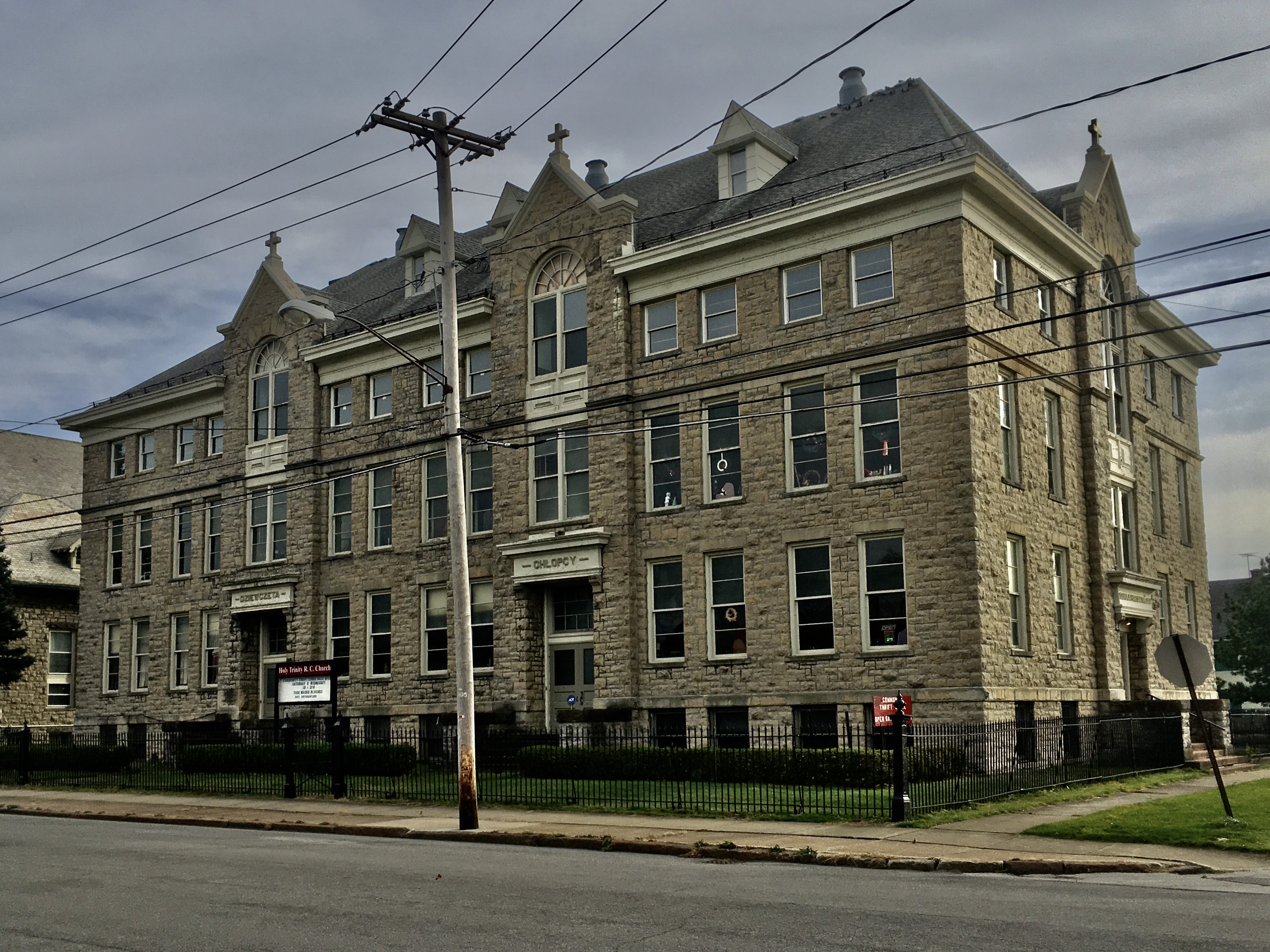
Holy Trinity Roman Catholic Church School, November 2020
