= Thomas R. Marshall House =

Historic house in Indiana, United States

- U.S. National Register of Historic Places
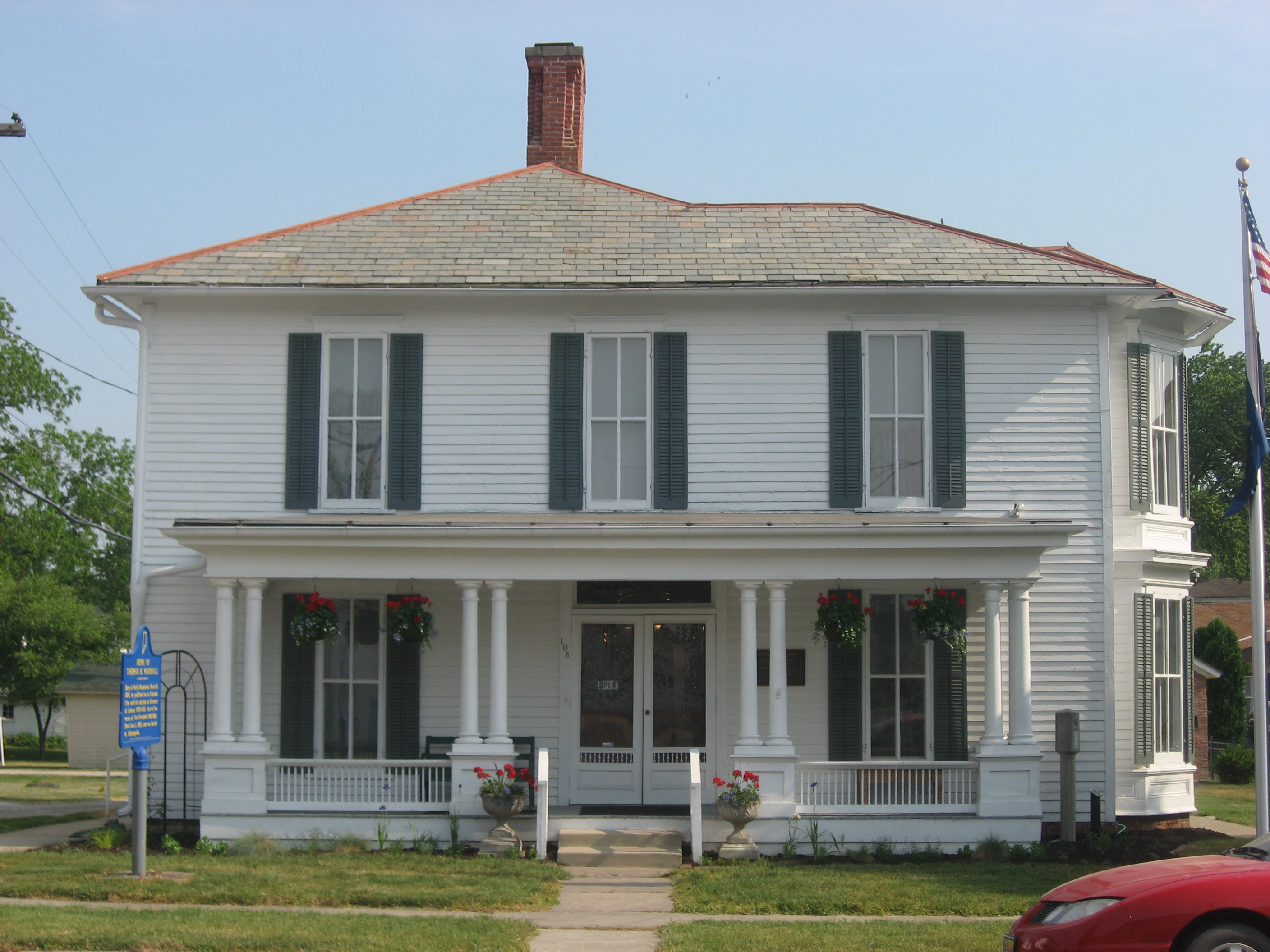
- Thomas R. Marshall House, May 2012

- Location within Indiana Location within the United States
- Location: 108 W. Jefferson St., Columbia City, Indiana
- Coordinates: 41°9′33″N 85°29′20″W
- Area: less than one acre
- Built: 1874
- NRHP reference No.: 83000046
- Added to NRHP: July 21, 1983

Thomas R. Marshall House, also known as the Whitley County Historical Museum, is a historic home located at Columbia City, Indiana. It was built in 1874, and is a two-story, "L"-plan, frame dwelling. It was remodeled in 1895. It features a nearly full-with front porch supported by paired Doric order columns and a projecting two-story bay. It was the home of Indiana Governor and U.S. Vice President Thomas R. Marshall.

It was listed on the National Register of Historic Places in 1983.
