= Jefferson Apartment Building (Niagara Falls, New York) =

Historic residential building in New York, United States

- U.S. National Register of Historic Places
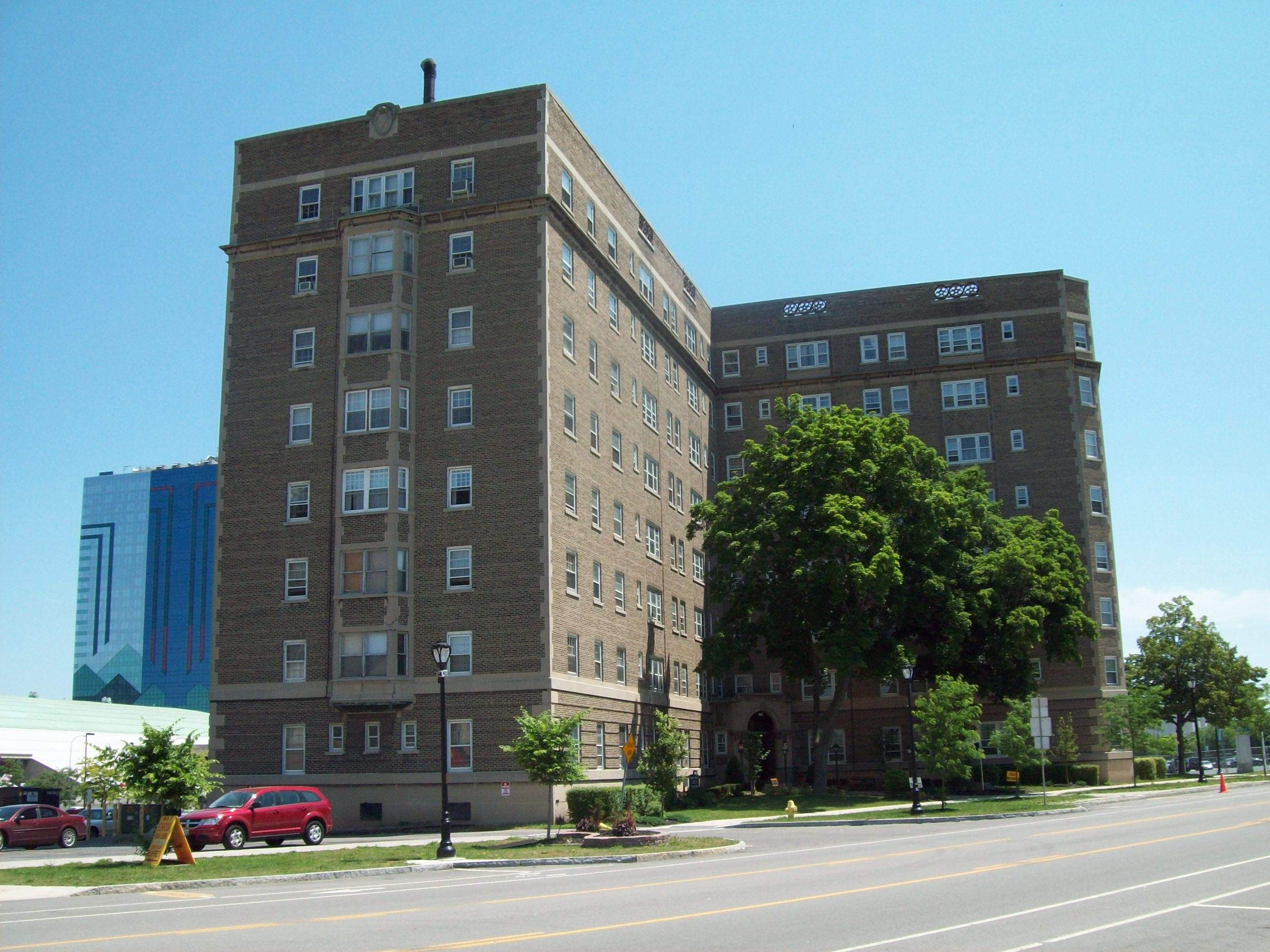
- Jefferson Apartment Building, June 2009

- Location within New York Location within the United States
- Location: 250 Rainbow Blvd., Niagara Falls, New York
- Coordinates: 43°5′10″N 79°3′33″W
- Built: 1926
- Architect: Kirkpatrick & Cannon
- Architectural style: Late Gothic Revival, Colonial Revival
- NRHP reference No.: 04001452
- Added to NRHP: January 5, 2005

Jefferson Apartment Building is a historic apartment building located at Niagara Falls in Niagara County, New York. It is an eight-story brick structure constructed in 1926 and is the city's sole example of a high rise, full service early 20th century apartment building designed for middle and upper income residents. Currently The Jefferson is still standing, fully renovated, and the premiere location for downtown living. You can visit the official website for leasing information.

It was listed on the National Register of Historic Places in 2005.
