= John Marshall House Museum =

Historic house in Illinois, United States

- John Marshall House Site
- U.S. National Register of Historic Places
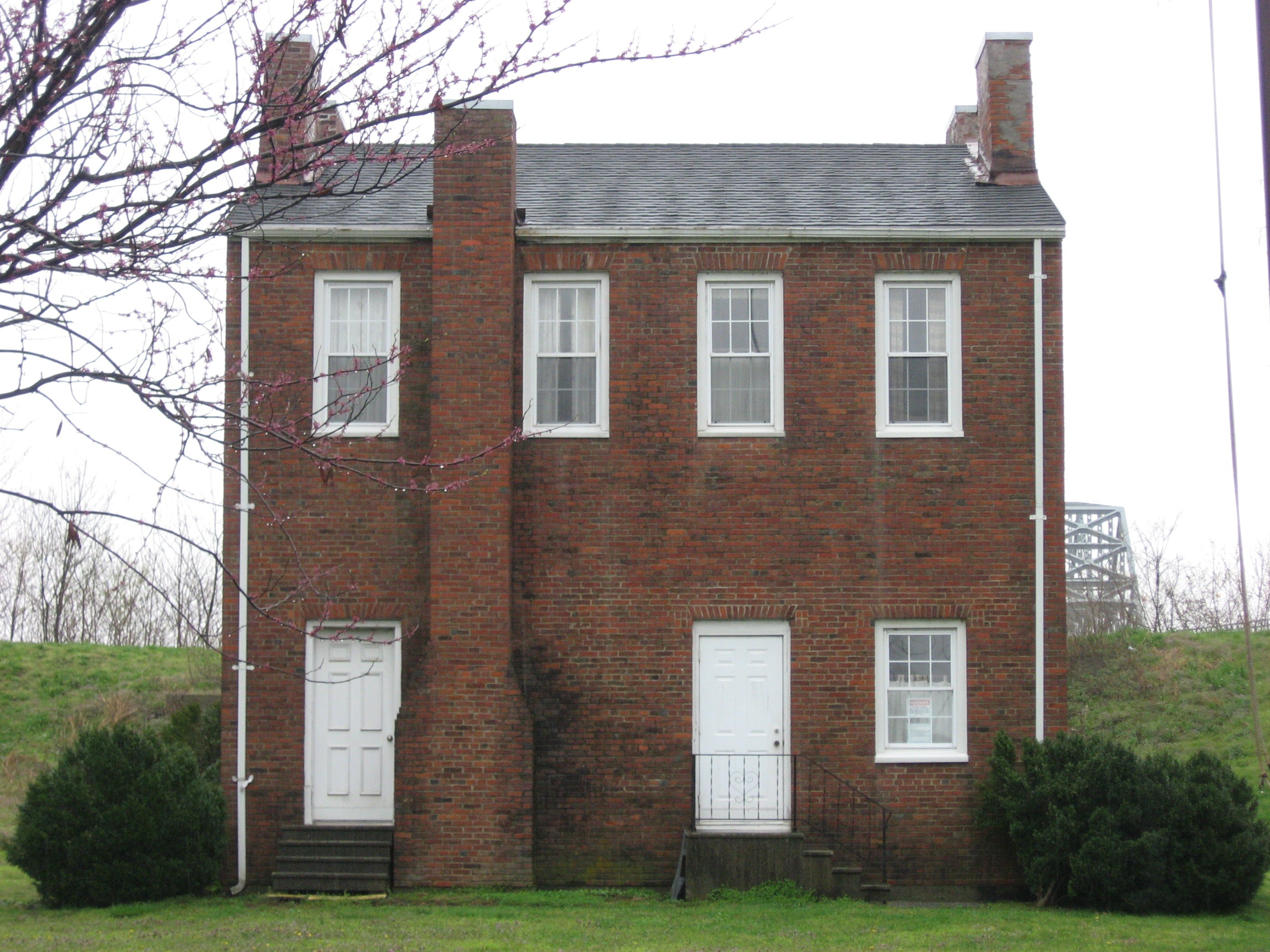
- The recreated John Marshall House

- Location within Illinois Location within the United States
- Nearest city: Old Shawneetown, Illinois
- Coordinates: 37°41′39″N 88°8′11″W
- Area: 35 acres (14 ha)
- Built: 1819
- NRHP reference No.: 75000659
- Added to NRHP: January 21, 1975

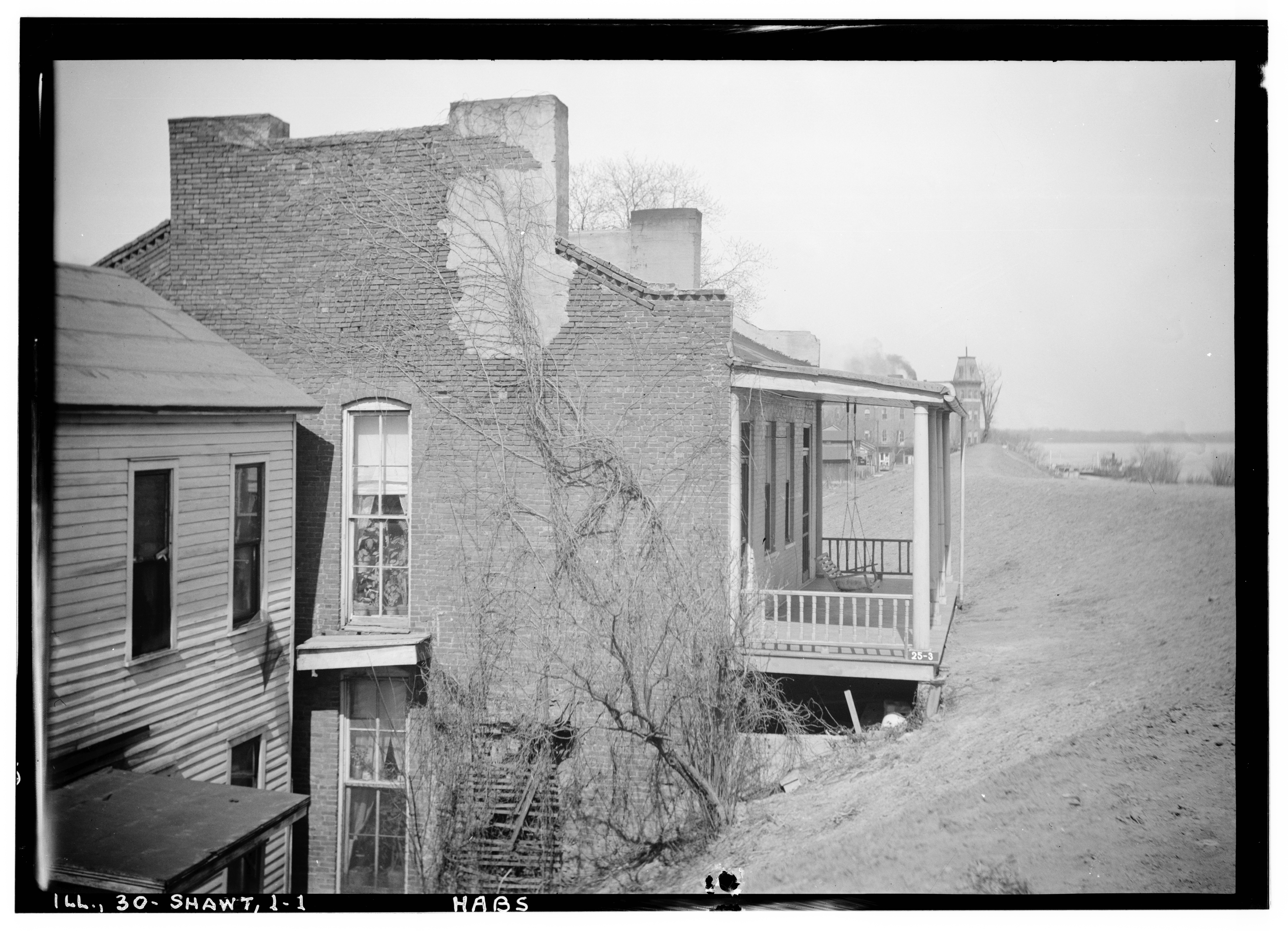
1934 photograph of the original 19th century house

The John Marshall House Museum is a historic house museum located in Old Shawneetown, Illinois. The museum is a historically inaccurate (the original had a straight staircase, the reproduction a spiral one, for example) reproduction of the John Marshall House, which was located at the site until 1974; the original house was demolished so that the reproduction could be constructed. The original house was built in the early 19th century for banker John Marshall, who ran the first bank in the Illinois Territory. At the time of its demolition, the house was one of the oldest surviving brick buildings in Illinois.

The house was added to the National Register of Historic Places on November 15, 1972, but this designation failed to prevent its destruction eighteen months later. Nevertheless, the original foundation remained, and the site retained significant integrity as a historical archaeological site. As a result, the site itself qualified to be re-listed on the National Register in January 1975.
