= 1831 United States Senate special election in Pennsylvania =

The 1831 United States Senate special election in Pennsylvania was held on December 13, 1831. George M. Dallas was elected by the Pennsylvania General Assembly to the United States Senate.

== Background ==
The Democratic-Republican Isaac D. Barnard was elected to the United States Senate by the General Assembly, consisting of the House of Representatives and the Senate, in December 1826. Sen. Barnard resigned on December 6, 1831, vacating the seat.

== Results ==
Following the resignation of Sen. Isaac Barnard, the Pennsylvania General Assembly convened on December 13, 1831, to elect a new senator to fill the vacancy. A total of eleven ballots were recorded. The results of the eleventh and final ballot of both houses combined are as follows:

State legislature results
| Party | Candidate | Votes | % |
|---|---|---|---|
| Democratic | George M. Dallas | 67 | 50.38 |
| Democratic | Joseph Hemphill | 34 | 25.56 |
| Anti-Masonic | Richard Rush | 30 | 22.56 |
| Democratic | Samuel B. Davis | 1 | 0.75 |
| N/A | Not voting | 1 | 0.75 |
| Totals | | 133 | 100.00% |

| Preceded by 1826 | Pennsylvania U.S. Senate election (Class I); 1831 | Succeeded by 1832–33 |
