= William Findlay (politician) =

American politician (1768–1846)

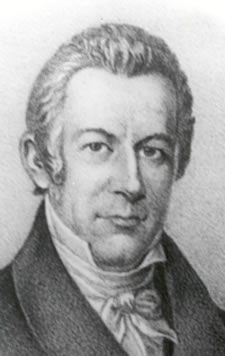

United States Senator from Pennsylvania
- In office December 10, 1821 – March 3, 1827
- Preceded by: Jonathan Roberts
- Succeeded by: Isaac D. Barnard

4th Governor of Pennsylvania
- In office December 16, 1817 – December 19, 1820
- Preceded by: Simon Snyder
- Succeeded by: Joseph Hiester

7th Treasurer of Pennsylvania
- In office 1807–1817
- Governor: Thomas McKean; Simon Snyder
- Preceded by: Isaac Weaver, Jr.
- Succeeded by: R. M. Crain

Member of the Pennsylvania House of Representatives
- In office 1804–1807

Personal details
- Born: June 20, 1768 Mercersburg, Province of Pennsylvania, British America
- Died: November 12, 1846 (aged 78) Harrisburg, Pennsylvania, U.S.
- Party: Democratic-Republican Party
- Spouse: Nancy Irwin (?-July 27, 1824; her death)
- Profession: Politician and public official
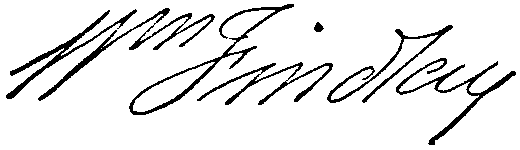
- Signature

William Findlay (June 20, 1768 – November 12, 1846) was an American farmer, lawyer, and politician. A member of the Democratic-Republican Party, he served as the fourth governor of Pennsylvania from 1817 to 1820, and as a United States senator from 1821 to 1827. He was one of three Findlay brothers born and raised in Mercersburg, Pennsylvania, on their family farm.

All became politicians, serving at national, state and local levels in Pennsylvania and Ohio in the early federal years. He sold Findlay Farm in 1823; it was listed on the National Register of Historic Places in 1982.

== Biography ==
William Findlay was born in Mercersburg in the Province of Pennsylvania on June 20, 1768, to Samuel Findlay and Jane (née Smith). He was the second of three sons, with older brother John Findlay and younger brother James Findlay. All three men became active in politics, serving at national, state and local levels.

Their grandfather Samuel Findlay (1711–1739) was the immigrant ancestor: he was born in County Londonderry in Ulster in 1711, and immigrated to the Province of Pennsylvania as a young man in 1730. He married there and he and his wife settled in Mercersburg, Pennsylvania. He died there in 1739.

After receiving a common-school education, William Findlay became a farmer. He became active in politics as a Jeffersonian Democrat. He served as brigade inspector in the state militia, and studied law with an established firm (reading the law as an apprentice.) He was admitted to the bar and commenced practice in Franklintown, Pennsylvania.

== Political career ==
Findlay was elected and served in the Pennsylvania House of Representatives in 1797 and 1804–1807. He served as state treasurer from 1807 to 1817.

In 1817, Findlay was nominated for the post of governor in the state's first open convention. He was elected governor and served until 1820. According to the Pennsylvania Historical and Museum Commission, in 1817 he emancipated the one slave he held and stated, "The principles of slavery are repugnant to those of justice." He also asked state legislators to pass laws to severely punish slave catchers who attempted to capture Africans in Pennsylvania and enslave them.

He was the first governor to lead the state from Harrisburg, newly designated as the capital. He directed many of the functions of state government from his private home while the new capitol building was under construction.

He was defeated for re-election in 1820 by Joseph Hiester.

In 1821, Findlay was elected by the state legislature as a Democratic Republican (later Jacksonian Democrat) to the United States Senate. He was filling the vacancy in the term commencing March 4, 1821, because the legislature had failed to select a candidate on time. He served from December 10, 1821, to March 3, 1827. He was not a candidate for re-election in 1826. In the U.S. Senate, he served as chairman of the Committee on Agriculture (19th Congress).

Later, he was appointed as the fifth treasurer of the U.S. Mint. He served for more than a decade, from 1827 to 1841. He resigned due to illness.

He had sold the Findlay Farm in 1823 to Benjamin Jordan and Edward Crouch. It was listed on the National Register of Historic Places in 1982, significant in part because of the political careers of the three brothers.

He died in Harrisburg, Pennsylvania, and his remains were interred at Harrisburg Cemetery.

== Family ==
He was the brother of United States Congressman John and United States Congressman and Cincinnati mayor James Findlay.

William Findlay married Nancy Irwin (1763–1824), who became Pennsylvania's First Lady from 1817 to 1820. They had two children, Jane Findlay Shunk (1792–1878) and John King Findlay. Nancy Irwin Findlay died on July 27, 1824, and is buried in Harrisburg Cemetery.

William Findlay's son, John King Findlay (born near Mercersburg, May 12, 1803; died in Spring Lake, New Jersey, September 13, 1885), was a noted jurist. He graduated from the United States Military Academy in 1824 and was assigned to the 1st Artillery of the U.S. Army. He was the assistant professor of chemistry, mineralogy, and geology at West Point from August 29 until November 4, 1824, of geography, history, and ethics until April 17, 1825, and was on topographical duty until May 13, 1828, when he resigned. In 1831, he was admitted to the Pennsylvania bar. He was recorder of Lancaster in 1841–1845, judge of the Philadelphia District Court 1845–1851, and president of the 3rd Judicial District of Pennsylvania in 1857–1862. After this he practiced law in Philadelphia. John King Findlay was a captain of militia 1840–1845 and 1852–1856. He published an enlarged edition of Archbold's Law of Nisi Prius (2 vols., Philadelphia, 1852).

William Findlay's daughter, Jane Findlay, married Francis R. Shunk, the 10th Governor of Pennsylvania. She held the position of First Lady of Pennsylvania from 1845 to 1848.

== Legacy ==
Findlay Township in Western Pennsylvania and Findlay Commons on the campus of Penn State University are both named for Governor Findlay.

== Notes ==
Party political offices
Preceded by Simon Snyder	Democratic-Republican nominee for Governor of Pennsylvania; 1817, 1820	Succeeded by John Andrew Shulze
Political offices
Preceded by Isaac Weaver, Jr.	Treasurer of Pennsylvania; 1807–1817	Succeeded by R. M. Crain
Preceded by Simon Snyder	Governor of Pennsylvania; December 16, 1817 – December 19, 1820	Succeeded by Joseph Hiester
U.S. Senate
Preceded by Jonathan Roberts	U.S. senator (Class 1) from Pennsylvania; December 10, 1821 – March 4, 1827; Served alongside: Walter Lowrie, William Marks	Succeeded by Isaac D. Barnard
