= John Andrew Shulze =

Sixth Governor of Pennsylvania (1774–1852)

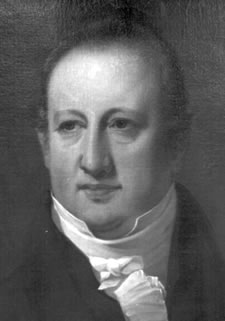

6th Governor of Pennsylvania
- In office December 16, 1823 – December 15, 1829
- Preceded by: Joseph Hiester
- Succeeded by: George Wolf

Member of the Pennsylvania Senate from the 8th district
- In office 1821–1823
- Preceded by: Henry Winter
- Succeeded by: John Harrison

Personal details
- Born: July 19, 1775 Tulpehocken Township, Province of Pennsylvania, British America
- Died: November 18, 1852 (aged 77) Lancaster, Pennsylvania, U.S.
- Party: Democratic-Republican; Jacksonian
- Spouse: Susan Kimmell (before 1852)
- Children: 5

John Andrew Shulze (July 19, 1775 – November 18, 1852) was a Pennsylvania political leader and the sixth governor of Pennsylvania. He was a member of the Muhlenberg family political dynasty.

== Early life and education ==
Shulze was born in Tulpehocken Township in the Province of Pennsylvania. He was the son of Eve Elizabeth (née Muhlenberg) and the Rev. Christopher Emmanuel Shulze. Shulze was the grandson of Henry Muhlenberg and the nephew of brothers Peter Muhlenberg and Frederick Muhlenberg, who were leading politicians. Shulze grew up in the Pennsylvania Dutch community speaking their German dialect, and for his entire life would speak English with a noticeable accent.

Shulze studied at Franklin College in Lancaster, Pennsylvania, and was ordained a minister in the Lutheran church in 1796. He left the ministry due to poor health in 1802 and became a merchant in Myerstown, Pennsylvania. Shulze married Susan Kimmell and they had five children together.

== Political career ==
Shulze was elected to the Pennsylvania General Assembly in 1806 and served three terms. From 1813 to 1821, he served in several low offices in Lebanon County. He served as a member of the Pennsylvania Senate for the 8th district from 1821 to 1823.

In 1823, he was elected Governor of Pennsylvania defeating former U.S. Senator Andrew Gregg. A large crowd attended his inaugural ceremonies on December 16, 1823. He was reelected in 1826 over John Sergeant in one of the most lopsided victories in Pennsylvania political history.

Together with Mayor Joseph Watson of Philadelphia, in the mid-1820s Schulze worked to recover young free blacks of a group of about 20 who had been kidnapped from Philadelphia in 1825 and sold into slavery in Mississippi, as well as to prosecute members of the Cannon-Johnson gang of Maryland/Delaware for the crimes. In 1826 he issued extradition notices related to them to the states of Virginia, Alabama and Mississippi. None of the white members were convicted. John Purnell, a mulatto member of the gang, was tried in Philadelphia County Court in 1826, convicted of two counts of kidnapping and sentenced to a fine and 42 years in prison. He died five years later in prison. Patty Cannon, considered the leader of the gang, evaded capture. She was indicted on four counts of murder in 1829 after the remains of four blacks were found buried on her land, but she died in jail before being tried, likely a suicide.

Shulze pushed to establish free compulsory education in Pennsylvania. Although it failed to pass during his administration, he laid the groundwork for its adoption and funding under his successor, George Wolf. He also oversaw major canal and road building projects in the state.

== Later life and legacy ==
Shulze declined to run for a third term and retired to Montoursville, Pennsylvania. He returned to public life briefly to become a delegate to the first national convention of the Whig Party in 1839. In 1840, he served as President of Pennsylvania's Electoral College which elected William Henry Harrison as the ninth President of the United States.

He died in Lancaster, Pennsylvania, November 18, 1852, and was buried in Woodward Hill Cemetery. His widow and former First Lady of Pennsylvania, Susan Kimmell Shulze, died on October 4, 1860. She is also buried in Woodward Hill Cemetery in Lancaster.

Shulze Hall, located on the campus of Penn State University, is named in his honor.

Party political offices
Preceded by William Findlay	Democratic-Republican nominee for Governor of Pennsylvania; 1823	Succeeded by None
First	Jacksonian nominee for Governor of Pennsylvania; 1826	Succeeded by George Wolf
Political offices
Preceded by Henry Winter	Member of the Pennsylvania Senate, 8th district 1821–1823	Succeeded by John Harrison
Preceded by Joseph Hiester	Governor of Pennsylvania; December 16, 1823 – December 15, 1829	Succeeded by George Wolf
