= African Observer =

1827 abolitionist publication published in Philadelphia

The African Observer
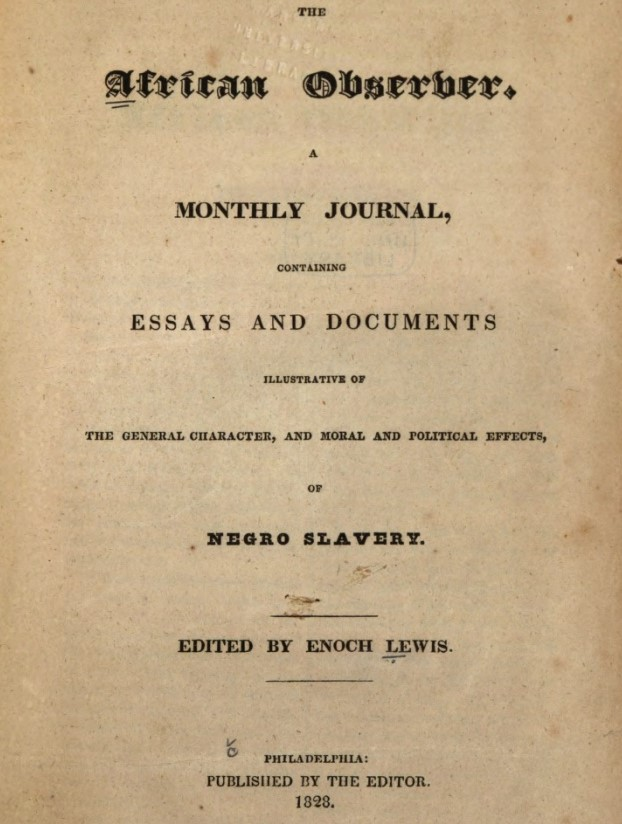
- Front cover of an 1828 edition of the American abolitionist newspaper, "The African Observer".
- Type: Journal
- Format: Magazine
- Owner: Enoch Lewis
- Publisher: Ashmead Printer
- Editor: Enoch Lewis
- Founded: April 1827
- Ceased publication: 1828
- Language: English
- Headquarters: Philadelphia, Pennsylvania
- OCLC number: 1461401

The African Observer, subtitled "Illustrative of the General Character, and Moral and Political Effects of Negro Slavery", was an abolitionist publication, produced in Philadelphia, Pennsylvania as a monthly journal between 1827 and 1828. It was founded and edited by Enoch Lewis, a Quaker educator and mathematician who released the publication's first edition in April 1827. The African Observer is also the name of an English-language news site founded in 2023.

According to Lewis's son, Joseph J. Lewis, the job "was a labor of love" for his father "rather than a business enterprise; his salary as editor being by no means sufficient for his support. But he was profoundly impressed with the growing importance of the political and social questions connected with slavery, and clearly foresaw that the history of the nation must for many years take its character from its dealings with this institution."

== History ==
During the mid-1820s, Lewis was recruited by the Pennsylvania Free Produce Society to design, launch and disseminate a new abolitionist publication. He was chosen by that group, according to historian Brian Temple, because he had rescued a runaway slave in 1803 by purchasing the man's freedom and had also invited a former slave to educate his [Lewis's] mathematics class about what life was genuinely like in America for enslaved men, women and children.

A half century after the publication's demise, Lewis's son, Joseph J. Lewis, reflected back on his father's involvement, calling it "a labor of love … rather than a business enterprise" because the salary he had been paid was not "sufficient for his support." The younger Lewis observed that his father had been "profoundly impressed with the growing importance of the political and social questions connected with slavery, and clearly foresaw that the history of the nation must for many years take its character from its dealings with this institution," adding that:

In view of the asperity which the controversy was already beginning to assume, and of the dangers threatened by the sectional alienation and the party passions which were growing up under it, his earnest desire was to introduce into the discussion the calmness of true statesmanship. He sought to apply to these questions at once the principles of political economy and those of humanity, principles universally accepted as laws of civilization; and, by showing the impolicy and waste, as well as the immorality of slavery, to reach the minds and hearts of its supporters. To convince and persuade, avoiding every expression which could provoke or exasperate; to remember that slaver-owner as well as slave was a man and a brother, and to bring to bear upon both all the resources of sound reason and of philanthropy."

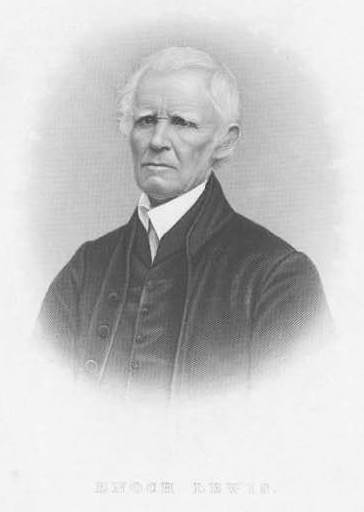
The African Observer's editor, Enoch Lewis.

Following eleven months of production, Enoch Lewis was forced, by economic circumstances, to cease operations. Demand had not been sufficient, according to Lewis's son, because the "Society of Friends, in which such a periodical would otherwise have found a large number of patrons, was distracted by internal questions of doctrine and discipline" and "torn by discord" when longtime minister Elias Hicks split from the church, taking with him his large group of followers (known as "Hicksites") after church elders decreed that Hicks had been preaching "doctrines incompatible with the faith of the early Friends."

== Content ==
During its brief period of operation, The African Observer "attempted to quell animosity between the North and South, dispel party disaffection, 'trace the moral influence of slavery on those who breathe its atmosphere" and "point out the best means for its peaceful extinction,'" according to historian Paul Finkelman. Its content included essays, source materials, and articles which were intended to objectively illustrate for Lewis's white contemporaries the evils of the institution of slavery. Essays and documents also traced the early origin of the African slave trade from the continent of Africa to the Americas.

The publication also included accounts of kidnappings of free people who were sold into slavery, including Cornelius Sinclair and other victims of the Cannon-Johnson gang who were abducted from the Philadelphia area in the summer of 1825. Most were helped to return to freedom in Philadelphia in 1826.
