= Enoch Lewis =

Enoch Lewis may refer to:

- Enoch Lewis (cricketer) (born 1954), West Indies cricketer
- Enoch Lewis (mathematician) (1776–1856), American mathematician
