= George M. Dallas =

Vice President of the United States from 1845 to 1849

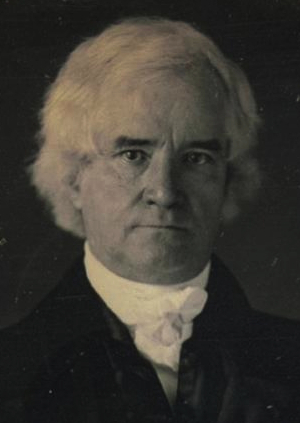
- Dallas in 1848

11th Vice President of the United States
- In office March 4, 1845 – March 4, 1849
- President: James K. Polk
- Preceded by: John Tyler
- Succeeded by: Millard Fillmore

United States Minister to the United Kingdom
- In office April 4, 1856 – May 16, 1861
- President: Franklin Pierce; James Buchanan; Abraham Lincoln
- Preceded by: James Buchanan
- Succeeded by: Charles Francis Adams Sr.

United States Minister to Russia
- In office August 6, 1837 – July 29, 1839
- President: Martin Van Buren
- Preceded by: John Randolph Clay
- Succeeded by: Churchill C. Cambreleng

17th Attorney General of Pennsylvania
- In office October 14, 1833 – December 1, 1835
- Governor: George Wolf
- Preceded by: Ellis Lewis
- Succeeded by: James Todd

United States Senator from Pennsylvania
- In office December 13, 1831 – March 3, 1833
- Preceded by: Isaac D. Barnard
- Succeeded by: Samuel McKean

United States Attorney for the Eastern District of Pennsylvania
- In office April 15, 1829 – December 13, 1831
- President: Andrew Jackson
- Preceded by: Charles Jared Ingersoll
- Succeeded by: Henry D. Gilpin

58th Mayor of Philadelphia
- In office October 21, 1828 – April 15, 1829
- Preceded by: Joseph Watson
- Succeeded by: Benjamin Wood Richards

Personal details
- Born: George Mifflin Dallas; July 10, 1792 Philadelphia, Pennsylvania, U.S.
- Died: December 31, 1864 (aged 72) Philadelphia, Pennsylvania, U.S.
- Resting place: St. Peter's Episcopal Church in Philadelphia
- Party: Democratic
- Spouse: Sophia Nicklin (m. 1816)
- Children: 8
- Parents: Alexander J. Dallas; Arabella Smith
- Relatives: Alexander J. Dallas (brother)
- Education: Princeton University (BA)

George Mifflin Dallas (July 10, 1792 – December 31, 1864) was an American politician and diplomat who served as the 11th vice president of the United States from 1845 to 1849. He also served as the mayor of Philadelphia from 1828 to 1829, and as the U.S. Minister to the United Kingdom from 1856 to 1861. Dallas is possibly the namesake of Dallas, Texas.

Born in Philadelphia, Dallas was a son of U.S. Treasury Secretary Alexander J. Dallas, and studied law in his father's office and was admitted to the bar in 1813. He served as the private secretary to Albert Gallatin and worked for the Treasury Department and the Second Bank of the United States. He emerged as a leader of the Family Party faction of the Pennsylvania Democratic Party. Dallas developed a rivalry with James Buchanan, the leader of the Amalgamator faction. Between 1828 and 1835, he served as the mayor of Philadelphia, U.S. attorney for the U.S. District Court of Pennsylvania and as Pennsylvania's attorney general. He also represented Pennsylvania in the United States Senate from 1831 to 1833 but declined to seek re-election. President Martin Van Buren appointed Dallas to the post of Minister to Russia, and Dallas held that position from 1837 to 1839.

In 1840, Dallas was elected to the American Philosophical Society. Dallas supported Van Buren's bid for another term in the 1844 presidential election, but James K. Polk won the party's presidential nomination. The 1844 Democratic National Convention nominated Dallas as Polk's running mate, and Polk and Dallas defeated the Whig ticket in the general election. A supporter of expansion and popular sovereignty, Dallas called for the annexation of all of Mexico during the Mexican–American War. He sought to position himself for contention in the 1848 presidential election, but his vote to lower the tariff destroyed his base of support in his home state. Dallas served as the Minister to the United Kingdom from 1856 to 1861 before retiring from public office.

== Family and early life ==
Dallas was born in Philadelphia on July 10, 1792, to Alexander James Dallas and Arabella Maria Smith Dallas. His father, of Scottish descent, born in Kingston, Jamaica, to Dr. Robert Dallas and educated in Edinburgh, was the Secretary of the Treasury under United States President James Madison, and was also briefly the Secretary of War. Dr Dallas left Jamaica in 1764, having mortgaged his estate, Dallas Castle, and put it in a trust. This property included 900 acres and 91 slaves. George Dallas was given his middle name after Thomas Mifflin, another politician who was good friends with his father. His mother, Arabella Smith, was English, born in England.

Dallas was the second of six children, another of whom, Alexander, would become the commander of Pensacola Navy Yard. During Dallas' childhood, the family lived in a mansion on Fourth Street, with a second home in the countryside, situated on the Schuylkill River. He was educated privately at Quaker-run preparatory schools, before studying at the College of New Jersey (now Princeton University), from which he graduated with highest honors in 1810. While at College, he participated in several activities, including the American Whig–Cliosophic Society. Afterwards, he studied law in his father's office, and he was admitted to the bar in 1813.

== Early legal, diplomatic and financial service ==
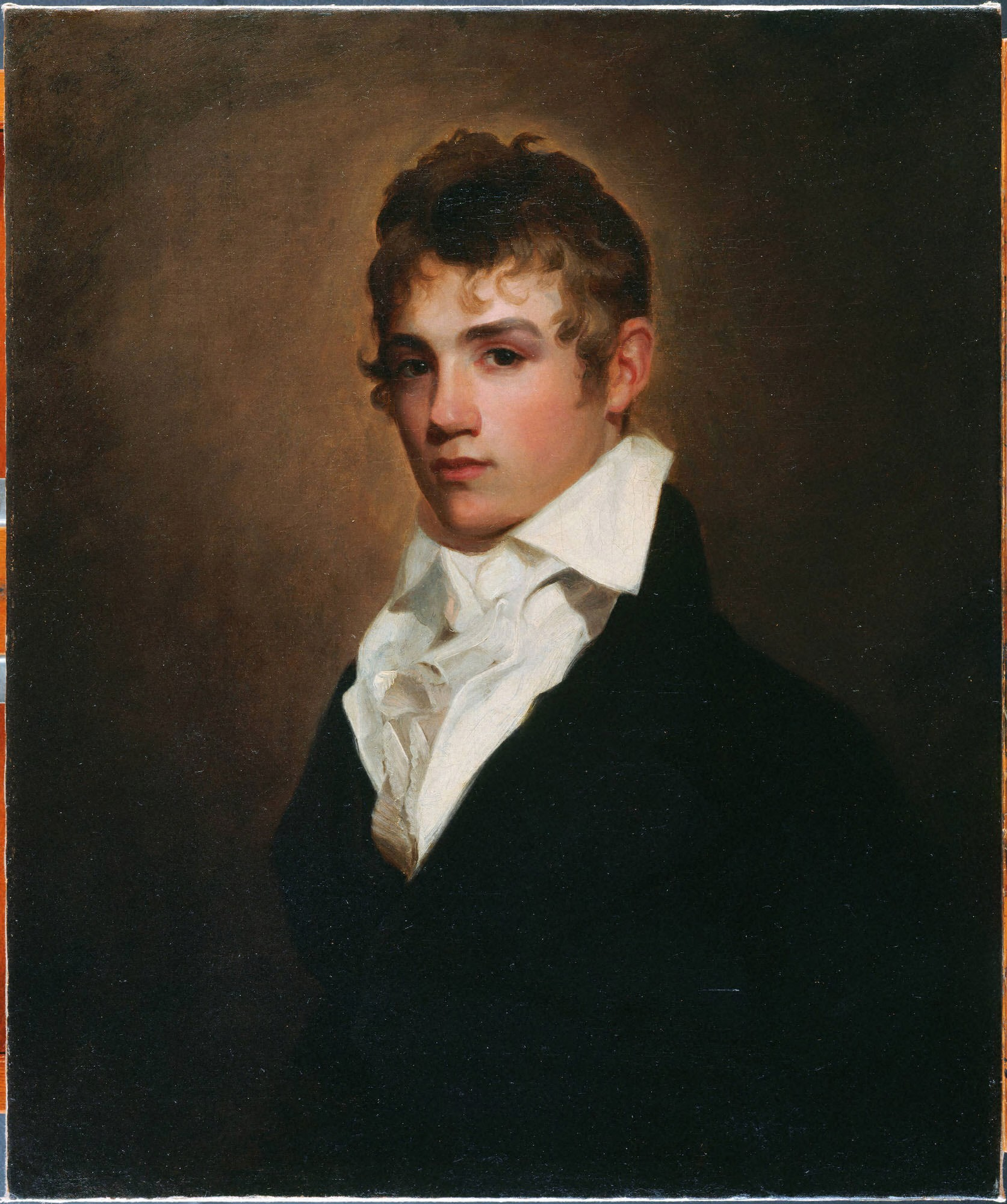
Portrait of Dallas by Thomas Sully, 1810

As a new graduate, Dallas had little enthusiasm for legal practice; he wanted to fight in the War of 1812, a plan that he dropped due to his father's objection. Just after this, Dallas accepted an offer to be the private secretary of Albert Gallatin, and he went to Russia with Gallatin who was sent there to try to secure its aid in peace negotiations between Great Britain and the United States. Dallas enjoyed the opportunities offered to him by being in Russia, but after six months there he was ordered to go to London to determine whether the War of 1812 could be resolved diplomatically. In August 1814, he arrived in Washington, D.C., and delivered a preliminary draft of Britain's peace terms. There, he was appointed by James Madison to become the remitter of the treasury, which is considered a "convenient arrangement" because Dallas' father was serving at the time as that department's secretary. Since the job did not entail a large workload, Dallas found time to develop his grasp of politics, his major vocational interest. He later became the counsel to the Second Bank of the United States. In 1817, Dallas' father died, ending Dallas' plan for a family law practice, and he stopped working for the Second Bank of the United States and became the deputy attorney general of Philadelphia, a position he held until 1820.

== Political career ==
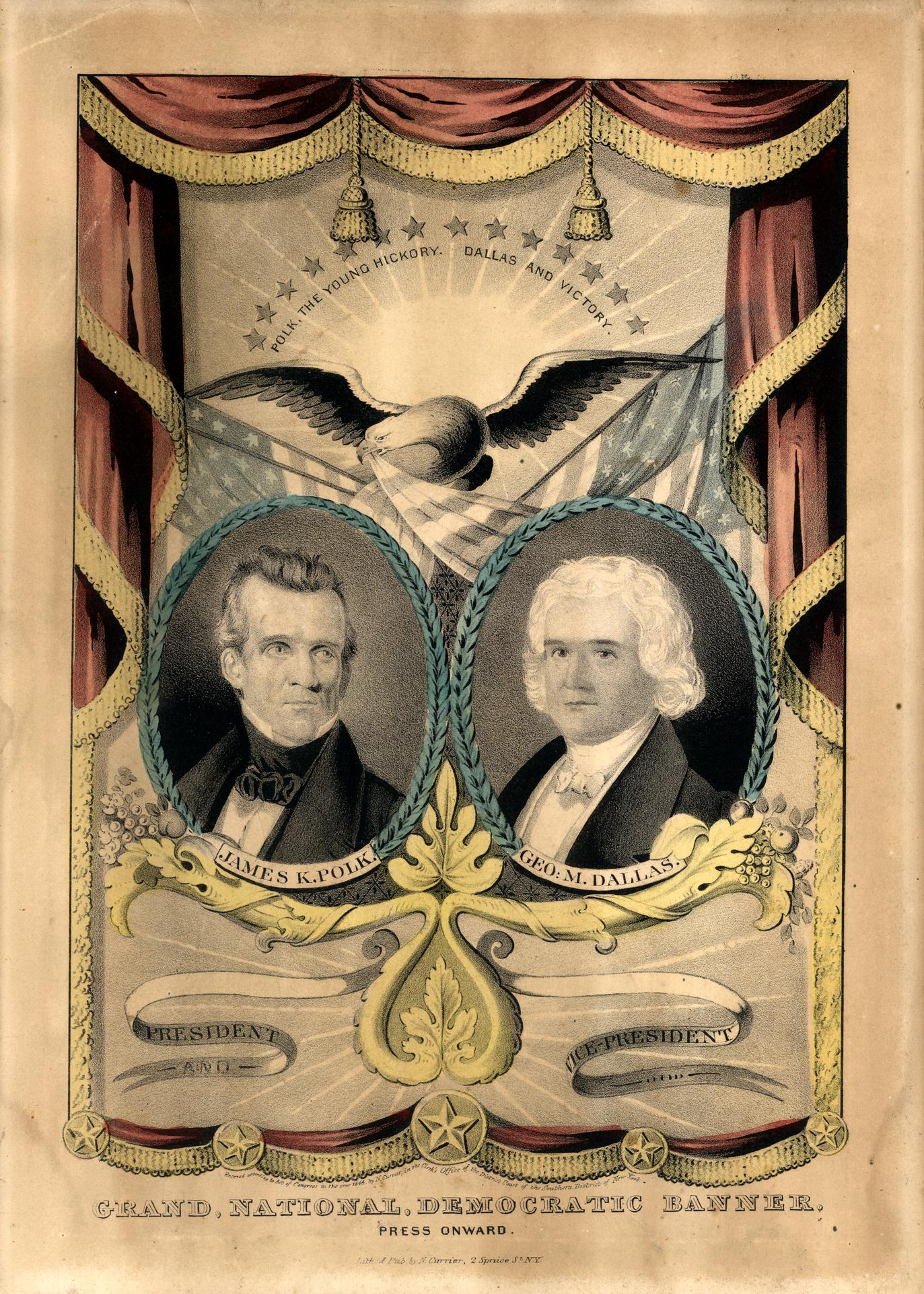
Polk/Dallas campaign poster

After the War of 1812, Pennsylvania's political climate was chaotic, with two factions vying for control of the state's Democratic Party. Dallas led the Philadelphia-based "Family Party", which asserted that the Constitution of the United States was supreme, and that an energetic national government should implement protective tariffs and a powerful central banking system, and undertake internal improvements to the country in order to facilitate national commerce. The other faction was called the "Amalgamators", headed by the future President James Buchanan.

He was elected mayor of Philadelphia as the candidate of the Family Party, after the party had gained control of the city councils. However, he quickly grew bored with that post, and became the United States Attorney for the eastern district of Pennsylvania in 1829, a position his father had held from 1801 to 1814, and continued in that role until 1831. In December of that year, he won a five-man, eleven-ballot contest in the state legislature for Senator from Pennsylvania, to complete the unexpired term of Isaac D. Barnard, who had resigned.

Dallas served less than fifteen months, from 13 December 1831 to 3 March 1833. He was chairman of the Committee on Naval Affairs. Dallas did not seek re-election, in part due to a fight over the Second Bank of the United States, and in part because his wife did not want to leave Philadelphia for Washington.

Dallas resumed the practice of law, and was Attorney General of Pennsylvania from 1833 to 1835.

He was appointed by President Martin Van Buren as Envoy Extraordinary and Minister Plenipotentiary to Russia in 1837, serving until 1839, when he was recalled at his own request. Dallas was then offered the post of US Attorney General, but declined, and resumed his legal practice. In the lead-up to the 1844 presidential election, Dallas supported Van Buren for the Democratic nomination over fellow Pennsylvanian James Buchanan.

== Vice presidency (1845–1849) ==
At the May 1844 Democratic National Convention in Baltimore, James K. Polk and Silas Wright were nominated as the Democratic ticket. However, Wright declined the nomination, and the delegates chose Dallas as his replacement. Dallas, who was not at the convention, was awakened at his home by convention delegates who had traveled to Philadelphia to tell him the news. Dallas somewhat reluctantly accepted the nomination. The Democratic candidates won the popular vote by a margin of 1.5%, and won the election with an electoral vote of 170 out of 275.

Dallas was influential as the presiding officer of the Senate, where he worked to support Polk's agenda and cast several tie-breaking votes. He called for the annexation of all of the Oregon Territory and all of Mexico during the Mexican–American War, but was satisfied with compromises that saw the United States annex parts of both areas. Though Dallas was unsuccessful in preventing Polk from appointing Buchanan as Secretary of State, he helped convince Polk to appoint Robert J. Walker as Secretary of the Treasury. As vice president, Dallas sought to maneuver himself into contention for the presidency in the 1848 election, as Polk had promised to serve only one term. However, Dallas' reluctant vote to lower a tariff destroyed much of his base in Pennsylvania, and his advocacy of popular sovereignty on the question of slavery strengthened opposition against him.

=== Tariffs ===
Dallas determined that he would use his vice-presidential position to advance two of the administration's major objectives: tariff reduction and territorial expansion. As a Pennsylvanian, Dallas had traditionally supported the protectionist tariff policy that his state's coal and iron interests demanded. But as vice president, elected on a platform dedicated to tariff reduction, he agreed to do anything necessary to realize that goal. Dallas equated the vice president's constitutional power to break tied votes in the Senate with the president's constitutional power to veto acts of Congress. At the end of his vice-presidential term, Dallas said he had cast thirty tie-breaking votes during his four years in office (although only nineteen of these have been identified in Senate records). Taking obvious personal satisfaction in this record, Dallas singled out this achievement and the fairness with which he believed he accomplished it in his farewell address to the Senate. Not interested in political suicide, however, Dallas sought to avoid having to exercise his singular constitutional prerogative on the tariff issue, actively lobbying senators during the debate over Treasury Secretary Walker's tariff bill in the summer of 1846. He complained to his wife (whom he sometimes addressed as "Mrs. Vice") that the Senate speeches on the subject were "as vapid as inexhaustible ... All sorts of ridiculous efforts are making, by letters, newspaper-paragraphs, and personal visits, to affect the Vice's casting vote, by persuasion or threat."

Despite Dallas' efforts to avoid taking a stand, the Senate completed its voting on the Walker Tariff with a 27-to-27 tie. (A twenty-eighth vote in favor was held in reserve by a senator who opposed the measure but agreed to follow the instructions of his state legislature to support it.) When he cast the tie-breaking vote in favor of the tariff on July 28, 1846, Dallas rationalized that he had studied the distribution of Senate support and concluded that backing for the measure came from all regions of the country. Additionally, the measure had overwhelmingly passed the House of Representatives, a body closer to public sentiment. He apprehensively explained to the citizens of Pennsylvania that "an officer, elected by the suffrages of all twenty-eight states, and bound by his oath and every constitutional obligation, faithfully and fairly to represent, in the execution of his high trust, all the citizens of the Union" could not "narrow his great sphere and act with reference only to [Pennsylvania's] interests." While his action, based on a mixture of party loyalty and political opportunism, earned Dallas the respect of the president and certain party leaders—and possible votes in 1848 from the southern and western states that supported low tariffs—it effectively demolished his home state political base, ending any serious prospects for future elective office. (He even advised his wife in a message hand-delivered by the Senate Sergeant at Arms, "If there be the slightest indication of a disposition to riot in the city of Philadelphia, owing to the passage of the Tariff Bill, pack up and bring the whole brood to Washington.")

While Dallas' tariff vote destroyed him in Pennsylvania, his aggressive views on Oregon and the Mexican War crippled his campaign efforts elsewhere in the nation. In his last hope of building the necessary national support to gain the White House, the Vice President shifted his attention to the aggressive, expansionist foreign policy program embodied in the concept of "Manifest Destiny". He actively supported efforts to gain control of Texas, the Southwest, Cuba, and disputed portions of the Oregon territory.

Dallas was influential as the presiding officer of the Senate, where he worked to support Polk's agenda and cast several tie-breaking votes. Dallas called for the annexation of all of the Oregon Territory and all of Mexico during the Mexican–American War, but was satisfied with compromises that saw the United States annex parts of both areas. Though Dallas was unsuccessful in preventing Polk from appointing Buchanan as Secretary of State, he helped convince Polk to appoint Robert J. Walker as Secretary of the Treasury. As vice president, Dallas sought to maneuver himself into contention for the presidency in the 1848 election, as Polk had promised to serve only one term. However, Dallas' reluctant vote to lower a tariff destroyed much of his base in Pennsylvania, and Dallas' advocacy of popular sovereignty on the question of slavery strengthened opposition against him.

== Post-vice presidency (1849–1864) ==
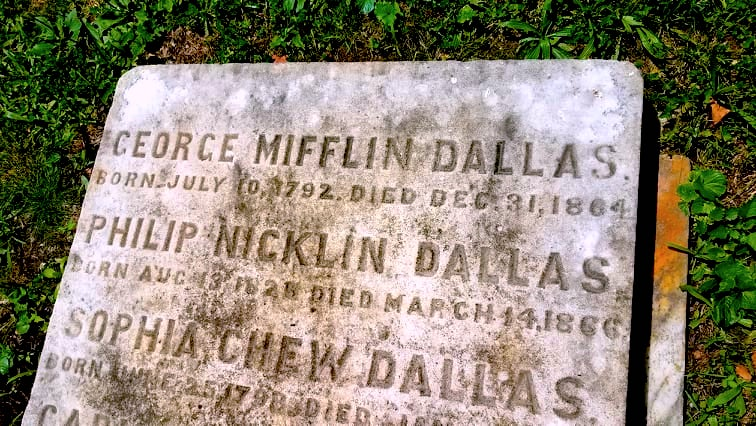
Dallas' gravestone at St. Peter's Episcopal churchyard in Philadelphia

In 1856, Franklin Pierce appointed Dallas minister to Great Britain. He served in that post from February 4, 1856, until the appointment by President Lincoln of Charles F. Adams, who relieved him on May 16, 1861. At the very beginning of his diplomatic service in Britain, he was called to act upon the Central American question and the US request that Sir John Crampton, the British minister to the United States, should be recalled. Dallas managed these delicate questions in a conciliatory spirit, but without any sacrifice of national dignity, and both were settled amicably. In 1859, following the U.S. Supreme Court's ruling in the Dred Scott decision, Dallas refused Frederick Douglass a passport, on the grounds that Douglass was not a citizen; decades later, in his autobiography, Douglass remarked "This man is now dead and generally forgotten... but I have lived to see myself everywhere recognized as an American citizen." At the close of his diplomatic career, Dallas returned to private life. He took no further part in public affairs except to express condemnation of secession.

=== Death ===
Dallas returned to Philadelphia, where he lived until his death from a heart attack on December 31, 1864, at the age of 72. He is interred at St. Peter's Episcopal churchyard in Philadelphia.

== Legacy ==
Dallas County, Iowa, and one of its cities, Dallas Center, Iowa, were named for Dallas.

He was initiated into Freemasonry at Franklin Masonic Lodge #134 in Pennsylvania, and served as the Grand Master of Freemasons in Pennsylvania in 1835; his name is memorialized by the Grand Lodge of Pennsylvania among its Past Grand Masters.

Dallas is also the namesake of Dallas County, Arkansas, Dallas County, Missouri, and Dallas County, Texas,

Other U.S. cities and towns named in Dallas' honor include Dallas, Texas, Dallas, Georgia (the county seat of Paulding County, Georgia), Dallas, North Carolina (the former county seat of Gaston County, North Carolina), Dallas, Oregon (the county seat of Polk County, Oregon)Dallas City, Illinois, and Dallastown, Pennsylvania.

== Bibliography ==
- Ambacher, Bruce (1975). "George M. Dallas and the Bank War". Pennsylvania History: A Journal of Mid-Atlantic Studies. 42 (2): 116–135. JSTOR 27772269.
- Ambacher, Bruce (1973). "George M. Dallas, Cuba, and the Election of 1856". The Pennsylvania Magazine of History and Biography. 97 (3): 318–332. JSTOR 20090763.
- Ambacher, Bruce Irwin (1971). George M. Dallas: Leader of the "Family" Party. Temple University.
- Belohlavek, John M. (1972). "Dallas, the Democracy, and the Bank War of 1832". The Pennsylvania Magazine of History and Biography. 96 (3): 377–390. JSTOR 20090654.
- Belohlavek, John M. (1974). "The Democracy in a Dilemma: George M. Dallas, Pennsylvania, and the Election of 1844". Pennsylvania History: A Journal of Mid-Atlantic Studies. 41 (4): 390–411. JSTOR 27772234.
- Belohlavek, John (2010). "George Mifflin Dallas". In L.Edward Purcell (ed.). Vice Presidents: A Biographical Dictionary. Infobase Publishing. pp. 108–118. ISBN 9781438130712.
- "George Mifflin Dallas." Dictionary of American Biography Base Set. American Council of Learned Societies, 1928–1936.
- Hatfield, Mark O. George Mifflin Dallas. Vice-Presidents of the United States, 1789–1983. Washington: U.S. Government Printing Office. 1979.
- "George Mifflin Dallas, 11th Vice President (1845–1849)". United States Senate.

Political offices
Preceded by Joseph Watson	Mayor of Philadelphia; 1828–1829	Succeeded by Benjamin Wood Richards
Preceded by John Tyler	Vice President of the United States; 1845–1849	Succeeded by Millard Fillmore
Legal offices
Preceded by Charles Jared Ingersoll	U.S. Attorney for the Eastern District of Pennsylvania; 1829–1831	Succeeded by Henry D. Gilpin
Preceded by Ellis Lewis	Attorney General of Pennsylvania; 1833–1835	Succeeded by James Todd
U.S. Senate
Preceded by Isaac D. Barnard	U.S. Senator (Class 1) from Pennsylvania; 1831–1833; Served alongside: William Wilkins	Succeeded by Samuel McKean
Diplomatic posts
Preceded by John Clay	United States Minister to Russia; 1837–1839	Succeeded by Churchill C. Cambreleng
Preceded by James Buchanan	United States Minister to Britain; 1856–1861	Succeeded by Charles Adams
Party political offices
Preceded by Richard Mentor Johnson; Littleton Tazewell; James K. Polk^{1}	Democratic nominee for Vice President of the United States; 1844	Succeeded by William Orlando Butler
Notes and references
1. The Democratic vice presidential nominee was split this year among three candidates.
