= James Todd (lawyer) =

American politician

Pennsylvania Attorney General
- In office December 18, 1835 – April 2, 1838
- Governor: Joseph Ritner
- Preceded by: George M. Dallas
- Succeeded by: William B. Reed

Personal details
- Born: December 25, 1786 York County, Pennsylvania
- Died: September 3, 1863 (aged 76) Greensburg, Westmoreland County, Pennsylvania
- Spouses: Mary Cornell; Jane Miller
- Children: 3,7

James Todd (December 25, 1786 – September 3, 1863) was a Pennsylvania lawyer and judge, who served in the state legislature and as state Attorney General.

== Biography and career ==
Todd was born in 1786, son of Henry and Mary Todd, of Scottish descent. Early in 1787, the family moved to Fayette County, and both his parents died that year. Todd was raised by one Duncan McLean. His official schooling was limited to one and a half years, but he read extensively at night.

Todd served as county commissioner 1815–1819, during which time he read law under John Bouvier. He served as a representative in the state legislature, 1819–1829. He was admitted to the bar in 1823.

Todd married Mary Cornell in 1810; she died in 1824. They had three children. Todd married Jane Miller (born 1802) in 1825, they had 7 children.

Todd served as prothonotary and clerk of the court 1825–1830. He was appointed attorney-general in 1835, and removed to Philadelphia. Todd resigned in 1838, when he was appointed president judge of the newly created court of Criminal Sessions of Philadelphia, which he served until the court was abolished in 1840. Afterwards he stayed in Philadelphia in private practice, until 1852, when he removed to Westmoreland county, where he stayed until his death in 1863. He was buried in the St. Clair Cemetery, Greenburg.

== Notable descendants ==
Todd's eldest son, David, had a daughter Mary Todd, who married the lawyer John A. Marchand. Their only child, a daughter, Mary Todd Marchand, married Cyrus Woods, a distinguished lawyer, politician, and ambassador, who also served a term as state Attorney General.

Todd's youngest son, Moses Hampton, had a career as a Philadelphia lawyer, including serving a term as state Attorney General.

Legal offices
Preceded by George M. Dallas	Attorney General of Pennsylvania; 1835–1838	Succeeded by William B. Reed
