= William Bradford Reed =

American journalist

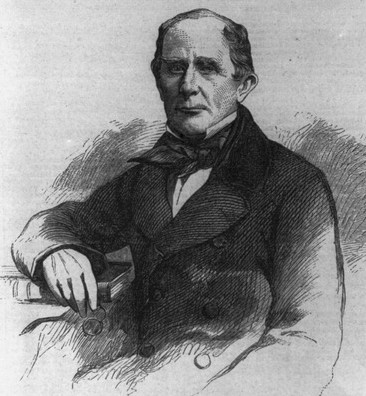
- Harper's Weekly sketch

Member of the Pennsylvania House of Representatives
- In office 1834–1835

Pennsylvania Attorney General
- In office April 2, 1838 – January 15, 1839
- Governor: Joseph Ritner
- Preceded by: James Todd
- Succeeded by: Ovid F. Johnson

Member of the Pennsylvania State Senate for the 1st district
- In office 1841–1842
- Preceded by: Jacob Gratz
- Succeeded by: William A. Crabb

2nd District Attorney of Philadelphia
- In office 1851–1856
- Preceded by: Horn R. Kneass
- Succeeded by: William B. Mann

Envoy to Qing Empire
- In office April 18, 1857 – November 11, 1858
- Preceded by: Peter Parker
- Succeeded by: John Elliott Ward

Personal details
- Born: June 30, 1806 Philadelphia, Pennsylvania, US
- Died: February 18, 1876 (aged 69) New York City, US
- Spouses: Louisa Whelan; Mary Love Ralston
- Education: University of Pennsylvania

William Bradford Reed (June 30, 1806 – February 18, 1876) was an American attorney, politician, diplomat, academic, and journalist from Pennsylvania. He served as a member of the Pennsylvania House of Representatives from 1834 to 1835. He was elected Pennsylvania State Attorney General in 1838 and served as a member of the Pennsylvania State Senate for the 1st district in 1841. He served as U.S. Minister to China in 1857. His pro-Confederacy views put him in conflict with other Pennsylvania politicians. He was the published author of multiple books, including the biographies of his grandfather, General Joseph Reed, and grandmother, Esther de Berdt.

== Early life and education ==
Reed was born in Philadelphia, Pennsylvania, to Joseph Reed and Maria Ellis Watmough. He graduated from the University of Pennsylvania in 1825, went to Mexico as a private secretary for Joel R. Poinsett, and studied law.

His brother was educator Henry Hope Reed.

== Career ==
Reed began his political career as an anti-Mason but switched to the Whig Party. He was elected to the Pennsylvania House of Representatives and served from 1834 to 1835. He was elected Pennsylvania Attorney General in 1838. He served as vice president of the Law Academy of Philadelphia from 1840 to 1841. He was elected a member of the Pennsylvania State Senate for the 1st district in 1841. He worked as a professor of American history at the University of Pennsylvania in 1850.

Between 1851 and 1856, Reed served as the District Attorney of Philadelphia. In 1856, he was elected to the American Philosophical Society.

Reed served as Minister to China from 1857 to 1858 In China, the U.S. had been neutral in the Second Opium War of 1856–58. Buchanan appointed Reed as Minister to China because Reed helped Buchanan win in 1856 by persuading old-line Whigs to support a Democrat. Reed's goal in China was to negotiate a new treaty that would win for the United States the privileges Britain and France had forced on China in the war. Succeeding through the signing of the Treaty of Tientsin (1858), where, similar to Britain and France, American diplomats were granted the right to reside in Peking, tariff levels for American goods reduced, and, uniquely, the free exercise of religion by foreigners in China guaranteed. The treaty helped set the roots of what later became Washington's Open Door policy.

After his return to the U.S. in 1860, he was active in Democratic Party politics after joining in 1856 and in New York journalism. For a time, he was an American correspondent for The Times of London. Reed published many controversial and historical pamphlets and contributed essays, chiefly to the American Quarterly and the North American Review. He wrote about his grandfather Joseph Reed in the book Life and Correspondence of Joseph Reed in 1847 and his grandmother Esther Reed in the book Life of Esther de Berdt in 1853.

Reed remained a friend and ally of U.S. President James Buchanan until the latter's death in 1868. He wrote an ultimately scrapped preface for Buchanan's autobiography in 1865. Buchanan subsequently paid him an advance to write a biography. Though Buchanan also bequeathed a conditional payout for Reed's wife, feeling that that may help incentivize the book's completion, Reed never finished it.

Reed was ostracized in the Democratic Party due to his pro-Confederacy views during the U.S. Civil War. He was hired to defend Confederate President Jefferson Davis in court after the U.S. Civil War was over; however, Davis never went to trial. he died in 1876.

Pennsylvania House of Representatives
Preceded by	Member of the Pennsylvania House of Representatives; 1834-1835	Succeeded by
Legal offices
Preceded by James Todd	Attorney General of Pennsylvania; 1838–1839	Succeeded by Ovid F. Johnson
Pennsylvania State Senate
Preceded by Jacob Gratz	Member of the Pennsylvania Senate, 1st district 1841	Succeeded by William A. Crabb
