= Findlay Farm =

Historic house in Pennsylvania, United States

- U.S. National Register of Historic Places
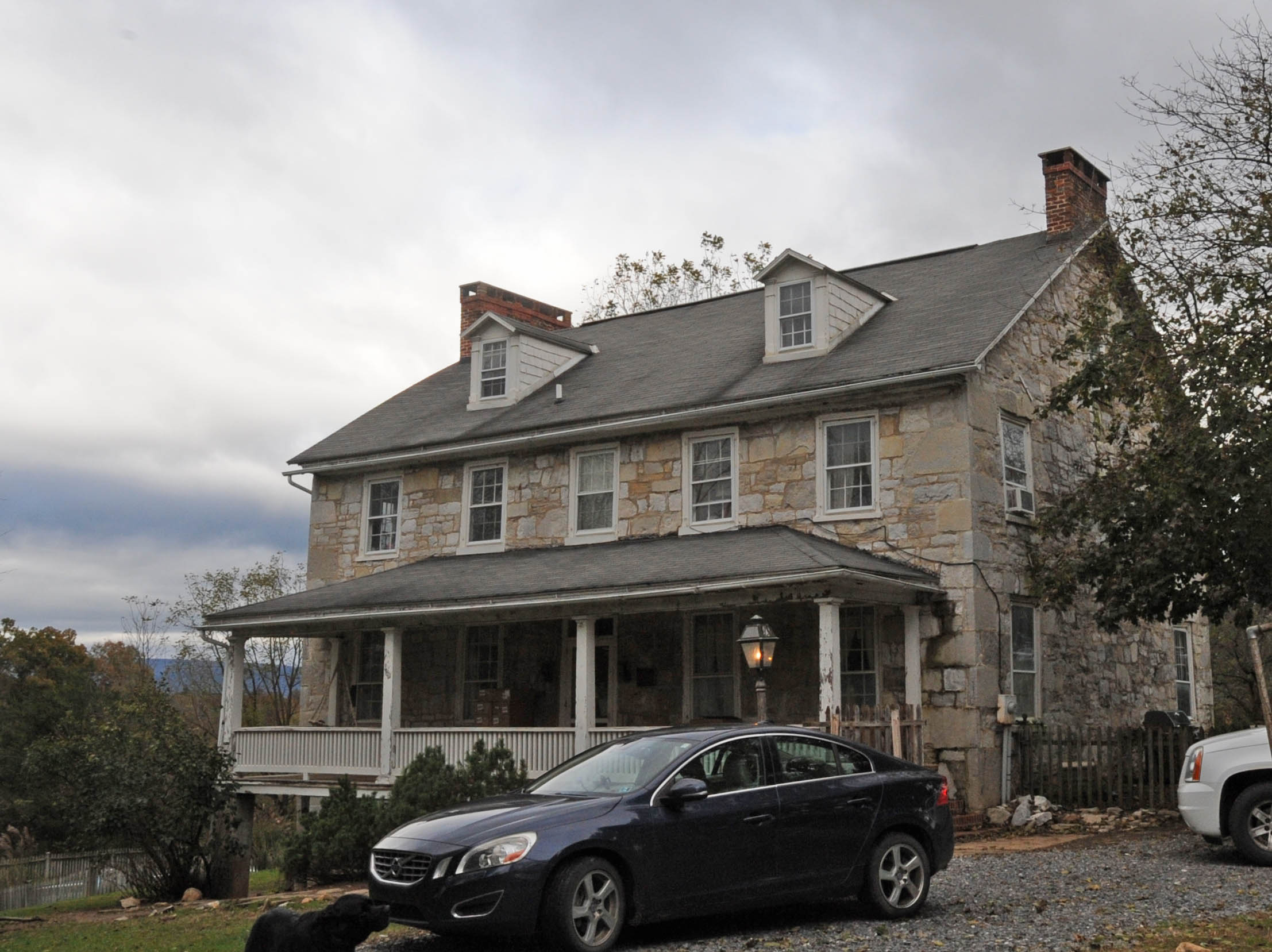

- Location within Pennsylvania Location within the United States
- Location: 6801 Findlay Road near Lamasters, Peters Township, Pennsylvania
- Coordinates: 39°49′50″N 77°51′55″W
- Area: 3.6 acres (1.5 ha)
- Built: 1825-1830
- NRHP reference No.: 83002245
- Added to NRHP: April 21, 1983

Findlay Farm is a historic home and farm complex located at Peters Township in Franklin County, Pennsylvania. The house was built between 1825 and 1830, and is a 2 1/2-story, five-bay rubble limestone dwelling with a gable roof. It has a full-length front porch added in the early 20th century. Also on the property is a 19th-century frame barn. The property was once owned by Pennsylvania Governor and U.S. Senator William Findlay (1768–1856), who sold it in 1823.

It was listed on the National Register of Historic Places in 1983.

== Gallery ==
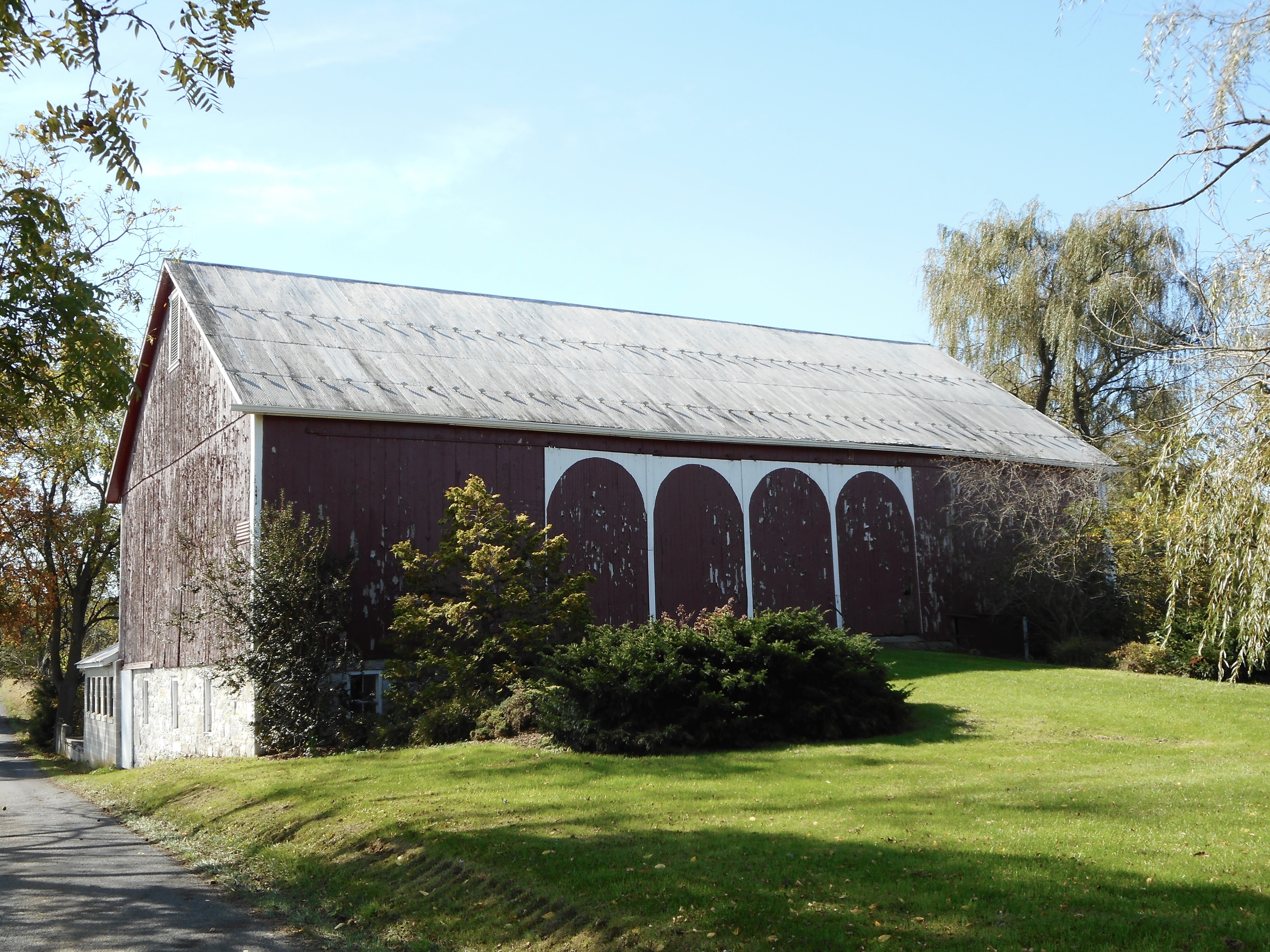
Barn
