= Patty Cannon =

American serial killer (c. 1759/1760–1829)

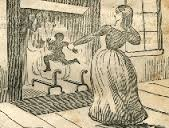
- Cannon holding a black child, by the arm, into a fireplace, from the 1841 book, Narrative and confessions of Lucretia P. Cannon
- Born: c. 1759/1760 or 1769
- Died: May 11, 1829 (aged 60 to 70); Sussex County Jail, Georgetown, Delaware, U.S.
- Cause of death: Disputed; possibly suicide by poisoning
- Resting place: Sussex County Jail Cemetery, Georgetown, Delaware (later reburied in a potter's field near the same jail)
- Other names: Lucretia P. Cannon, Patricia Cannon, Lucretia Hanly, Martha Cannon
- Occupations: Kidnapper, illegal slave trader, slave stealer
- Known for: Illegal slave trading, co-leader of the Cannon–Johnson Gang of Maryland–Delaware
- Spouse: Jesse Cannon
- Children: 2
- Status: Deceased
- Criminal charge: Murder (4 counts)

Details
- Victims: 11 (confessed); 4 (charged)

Cannon–Johnson Gang
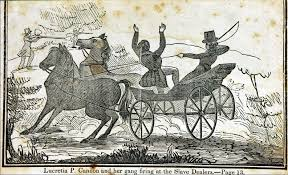
- Cannon–Johnson Gang, attacking legal slave traders, from the 1841 book, Narrative and confessions of Lucretia P. Cannon, who was tried, convicted, and sentenced to be hung at Georgetown, Del. ...
- Founded by: Patty Cannon and Joe Johnson
- Founding location: Reliance (Caroline and Dorchester counties, Maryland)
- Years active: Early 1820s–1829
- Territory: Maryland, Delaware, Delmarva Peninsula, Chesapeake Bay, Philadelphia, New Jersey, Georgia, Southern United States
- Membership (est.): 4 or more
- Criminal activities: Kidnapping, illegal slave trading, slave stealing, murder

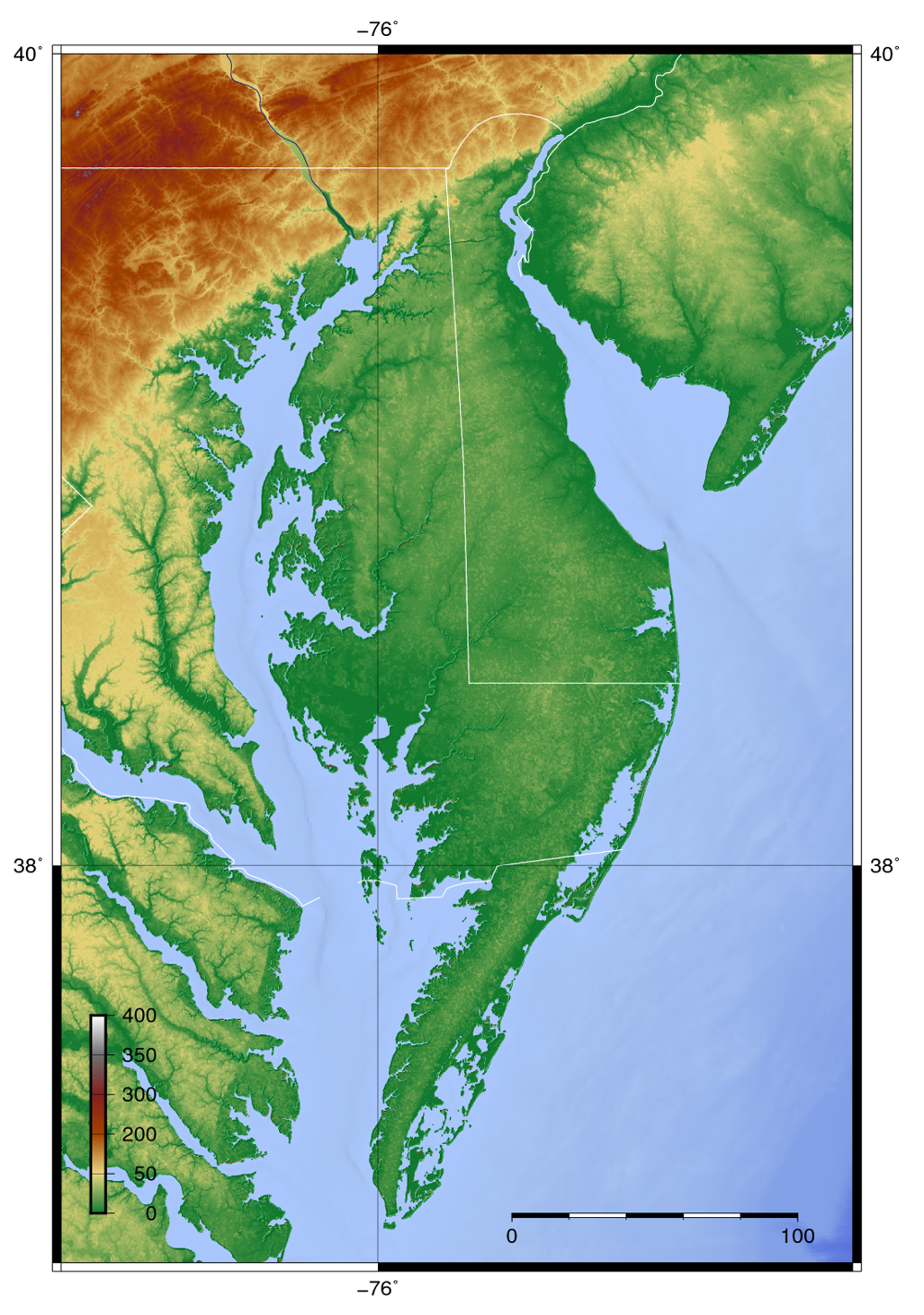
The Delmarva Peninsula of Maryland and Delaware, where the Cannon–Johnson Gang committed most of their kidnapping illegal slave trade operations. Note the white line boundary dividing the peninsula into three states which also included Virginia.

Patty Cannon, whose birth name may have been Lucretia Patricia Hanly (c. 1759/1760 or 1769 – May 11, 1829), was an illegal slave trader, serial killer, and the co-leader of the multi-racial Cannon–Johnson Gang of Maryland–Delaware. The group operated for about a decade in the early 19th century and abducted hundreds of free Black people and fugitive slaves, along the Delmarva Peninsula, across multiple state lines to sell into slavery in southern states such as Alabama and Mississippi. The activity became known as the Reverse Underground Railroad.

Mayor Joseph Watson of Philadelphia and Governor John Andrew Shulze of Pennsylvania worked to recover young free black people kidnapped by the gang in the summer of 1825 and to prosecute the gang members. They did not succeed in trying any of the white members. The only time any real effort was made to arrest and convict the gang was when authorities found the bodies of several white slave traders, a child and a baby. After being acquitted in Mayor's Court, biracial gang member John Purnell (aliases include "John Smith") was convicted on two counts of kidnapping in Philadelphia County Court in Pennsylvania in 1827. He was sentenced to a fine and 42 years in jail. He died in jail five years later.

In 1829, Cannon was the only member of the gang captured and indicted in Delaware for four murders after the remains of four black people (including three children) were discovered on property she owned. She was held at the Sussex County Jail. She confessed to nearly two dozen murders and died in prison while awaiting trial. Some sources say she killed herself with poison.

Beginning in 1841, some popular accounts referred to the illegal slave trader as Lucretia P. Cannon, although no evidence indicates she used the name "Lucretia" in her lifetime. A popular 19th-century novel based on her exploits contributed to her mythic status as a ruthless figure. She has continued to appear in fiction. The state of Delaware placed a historical marker in Seaford dedicated "to the victims of this evil enterprise, and those who struggled against it."

== Marriages and early crimes ==
Cannon married local farmer Jesse Cannon and they lived near what is now Reliance, Delaware/Maryland (then called Johnson's Crossroads), on the border with Delaware at the convergence of Caroline and Dorchester counties in Maryland, and Sussex County, Delaware. Jesse Cannon died around 1826.

Cannon and her husband had at least one daughter, who twice married men known to engage in slave-stealing and kidnapping. The daughter first married Henry Brereton, a blacksmith who kidnapped free black Americans for sale into slavery. Brereton was convicted and imprisoned in 1811 for such kidnapping, but escaped from the Georgetown, Delaware jail. Brereton was captured, convicted of murder in another case, and hanged with one of his criminal associates, Joseph Griffith.

Some time after this, Cannon's daughter married Joe Johnson, who became the mother's most notorious partner in crime. Johnson had a tavern a few miles from the Cannon house. Information about Cannon and Johnson has been confusing, with fact and fiction mixed; Johnson has been described as Cannon's husband or son-in-law. The Cannon–Johnson gang included whites and blacks, among them Henry Carr and John Purnell, described as a "yellow" man or mulatto, who used several aliases. They served as decoys to get young blacks aboard their boat or close enough to take captive. Robert Brereton, a relative of Cannon's late son-in-law, also continued to be involved with the gang at least until 1826.

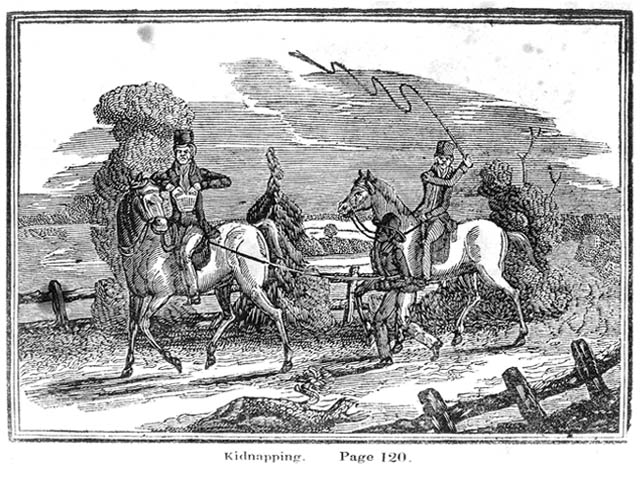
Kidnapping a free black to be sold into slavery

== Political and economic excuses for slaves ==
The U.S. Congress banned the importation of slaves in 1807. Because of demand due to development of cotton culture in the Deep South and the spread of short-staple cotton made profitable by invention of the cotton gin, the domestic slave trade became even more lucrative. The cash value of slaves shot upward, creating a strong incentive for kidnappers. By this time, many free black Americans lived in Maryland and Delaware, which were still slave states, as a result of manumissions after the Revolutionary War.

In addition, nearby Philadelphia, Pennsylvania had the largest population of free black Americans in the North and no professional police force in the antebellum years. Residents, especially children because they were more easily controlled, were at risk from kidnappers. At a time when southern slaveholders came to the city with their slaves, it was difficult for onlookers to determine what was happening between adults and children, and especially between adult black Americans and those who appeared to be their children, when kidnappers used black accomplices.

Cannon's kidnapping forays could trawl waterfront areas throughout the region, enticing young men aboard their boat to help decoy workers. The kidnapping of free blacks left their land and other property behind. The local white communities generally did not take action on behalf of free blacks, if they learned of such kidnappings at all. But Philadelphia had an active mayor, Joseph Watson, a Quaker, who made concerted efforts on behalf of stolen free blacks with officials in Mississippi and Alabama, which included paying for gathering of affidavits and, in the case of Cornelius Sinclair in 1827, a white witness to travel to Alabama to attest to his identity.

A novel written about Cannon sixty years after she was most active, The Entailed Hat, Or, Patty Cannon's Times (1884), suggests that the War of 1812, in which thousands of slaves joined the British for freedom, contributed to lack of local white community interest in Cannon's crimes against blacks. The novel describes British activities in Tangier Island of Virginia, Cambridge, Maryland and Georgetown, Delaware, where they recruited slaves to escape their masters and fight with the British by promising them freedom.

In them days they didn't kidnap much; it was jest a-beginnin'. The war of '12 busted everything on the bay, burned half a dozen towns, kept the white men layin' out an' watchin', and made loafers of half of 'em, an' brought bad volunteers an' militia yer to trifle with the porer gals, an' some of them strangers stuck yer after the war was done. I don't know whar ole Ebenezer come from; some says this, an' some that. All we know is, that he an' the Hanlen gals, one of 'em Patty Cannon, was the head devils in an' after the war....

The British begun to run the black people off in the war. The black people wanted to go to 'em. The British filled the islands in Tangier yer with nigger camps; they was a goin' to take this whole peninsuly, an' collect an' drill a nigger army on it to put down Amerikey. When the war was done, the British sailed away from Chesapeake Bay with thousands of them colored folks, an' then the people yer begun to hate the free niggers....

— excerpt from Chapter XXIV of The Entailed Hat by George Alfred Townsend, 1884

== Accounts of gang crimes ==
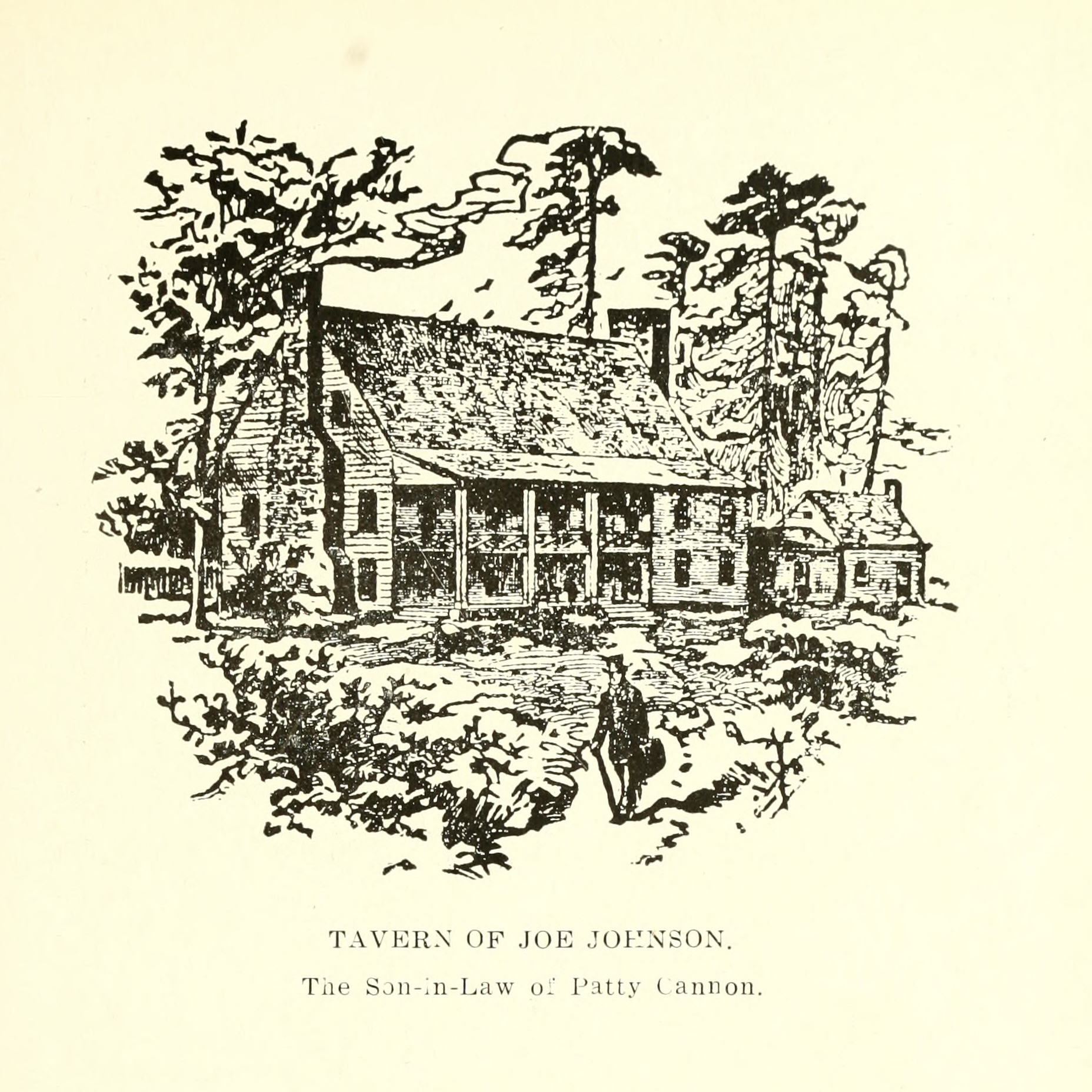
Tavern of Joe Johnson the son-in-law of Patty Cannon.

Detailed accounts by kidnapping victims who regained freedom in 1826 were published in the abolitionist journal, The African Observer, published in Philadelphia in 1826 through 1827. Kidnapped captives were chained and hidden in the basement, attic, and secret rooms in Cannon's house. Captives were taken in covered wagons to Cannon's Ferry (now Woodland Ferry). They were often put aboard a schooner traveling down the Nanticoke River to the Chesapeake Bay, from where they were shipped to Georgia and other slave markets. Some were taken overland for sale in Alabama and Mississippi.

The gang's activities continued for many years. Local law enforcement officials were reluctant to halt the illegal operations, and may have been afraid of the gang's reputation for violence. When Patty Cannon learned the police were coming, she would slip across state lines away from local police forces.

According to depositions from victims who gained freedom and returned to homes in the North, Joe Johnson kept the captives in leg irons. He "severely whipped" captives who insisted they were free, to stop them from giving that account. His wife, Patty's daughter, was overheard saying that it "did [her] good to see him beat the boys." ("Boy" was a degrading reference to a black man of any age; Mrs. Johnson was not strictly referring to male children.)

Lydia Smith, a 25-year-old free black woman, testified that she was kidnapped in 1825 and kept in Cannon's home before being moved to Johnson's tavern. She was held there for five months until she was shipped south with a large lot of kidnapped free blacks being sold into slavery.

== Indictment ==
The gang was initially indicted in May 1822. Joe Johnson was sentenced to the pillory and 39 lashes; records show the sentence was carried out. Cannon and several other gang members, though charged with Johnson, apparently were not prosecuted.

In the mid-1820s, Mayor Joseph Watson of Philadelphia and Governor John Andrew Schulze cooperated to retrieve kidnapped young blacks from Mississippi and to prosecute the Cannon–Johnson gang. In 1826 Watson offered a $500 (~$14,228 in 2025) reward for information leading to the arrest of members, and Schulze issued orders of extradition to the states of Virginia, Alabama and Mississippi. That year they aided most of the young free blacks kidnapped and sold in Mississippi the year before to gain freedom and return to Philadelphia. At least one had died of a beating.

In 1827, after Cornelius Sinclair had been freed from slavery in Alabama, he was among witnesses to testify against Henry Carr and John Purnell (alias "John Smith"), two members of the gang who were prosecuted for kidnapping free blacks. They were acquitted in Mayor's Court, and Carr left for Alabama, where he died in 1828. Purnell was also tried in the Philadelphia County Court, where he was convicted in Philadelphia on two counts of kidnapping, and sentenced to a $4000 (~$117,273 in 2025) fine and 42 years in prison. He died five years later while incarcerated in Walnut Street Prison in the city.

In 1829, bodies of four black people, including three children, were discovered buried on farm property which Cannon owned in Delaware. A tenant farmer uncovered their remains during plowing. In April 1829, Patty Cannon was indicted on four counts of murder by a grand jury of 24 white males:

- an infant female on April 26, 1822
- a male child on April 26, 1822
- an adult male on October 1, 1820
- a "Negro boy" on June 1, 1824

The indictments were signed by James Rogers, the Attorney General of Delaware. Witness Cyrus James stated he saw Cannon take an injured "black child not yet dead out in her apron, but that it never returned." James, a mixed-race (mulatto) man, had been purchased as a slave by Cannon when he was only seven years old. He had grown up in her household and participated in her crimes, sometimes serving as a decoy to make free blacks feel safe in working with him on a task.

== Death ==
Cannon confessed to nearly two dozen murders of black kidnap victims, and died in prison while awaiting trial. Cannon died in her cell, in Georgetown, Delaware, on May 11, 1829, at an age estimated to be between sixty and seventy. Sources differ as to whether she was convicted and sentenced to hang before her death. Shields asserts that she killed herself. Other sources contend that she died of natural causes. The novel The Entailed Hat attributes her death to self-administered poison.

== Burial ==
Her body was initially buried in the graveyard of the Georgetown, Delaware jail. Before that land was developed as a parking lot in the 20th century, her remains, along with those of two other women, were exhumed and reburied in a potter's field near the new jail.

== Public display of her skull ==
Her skull was separated from the rest of her bones, lying in the pauper's grave or potter's field, when a future parking lot was being excavated, and the skull was later put on display in various venues, including on loan to the Dover Public Library in 1961. It was loaned to the Smithsonian in 2010 to allow scientists to learn more about settler life in the Chesapeake.

== Legacy ==
In the 1990s, a historical marker was placed on the highway near what is sometimes called the "Patty Cannon House" in Reliance, Maryland, but this structure was built about 1840. A PBS history series proved the marker was placed on land which Joe Johnson bought in 1821 for $150, and Patty Cannon bought from him in 1826. Her own residence, which was built in the 18th century, stood several hundred yards away and was torn down in 1948. "Nearby Stood" was later added to the marker. In 2012, a new marker, which more explicitly details the horrors committed by the Cannon/Johnson gang, was erected across the state line from the previous marker. A housing development, established in the early 1970s, stands on the Delaware side of the Nanticoke River and is named the Patty Cannon Estates.

== Representation in other media ==
- She figures into a number of collections of folkloric stories involving ghosts later collected into books.
- Narrative and Confessions of Lucretia P. Cannon (1841), published anonymously in New York. This pamphlet inspired others, in which the main character's name and crimes were changed. These pamphlets were a subgenre of sensational literature which resembled a combination of modern pulp magazines and true crime books; they were contemporary with the British penny dreadfuls. Cannon was given the first name "Lucretia" in the 1841 pamphlet, apparently to associate her with the notorious poisoner Lucretia Borgia.
- The Entailed Hat, or, Patty Cannon's Times, a novel by George Alfred Townsend was published in 1884. Its popularity resulted in numerous hardback editions; it was reissued in 1890, 1912, 1955 and 1969. A paperback edition was issued in March 2007.
- The slave-stealing Patty Ridenour character in a sixth-season episode of Homicide: Life on the Street entitled "Sins of the Father" (aired January 9, 1998) appears to be modeled on Cannon.
- James McBride features Cannon in his 2008 historical novel Song Yet Sung (2008).
- Clive Cussler and Grant Blackwood's novel Spartan Gold (2009), is based in part upon Cannon and a modern-day search for valuable stolen artifacts which she may have left behind.
- The WGN TV series Underground introduced the character Patty Cannon (played by Brigid Brannagh and then Sadie Stratton) in its first-season finale (2016). This was an anachronism since the series takes place in the late 1850s, decades after Cannon's death, yet portrays her as fairly young.
- Cannon was featured in the Season 11, episode 4 of Deadly Women.

== See also ==
- Darya Nikolayevna Saltykova
- Delphine LaLaurie
- Elizabeth Bathory
- James Ford (pirate)
- John Crenshaw
- Lavinia Fisher – American criminal

General:

- List of serial killers in the United States
- List of American slave traders
