= 1826 Pennsylvania gubernatorial election =

- October 10, 1826
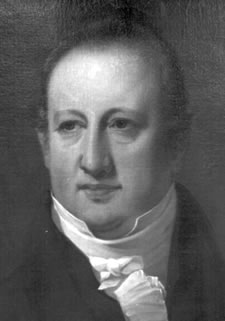
Nominee	John Andrew Shulze
Party	Jacksonian
Popular vote	72,710
Percentage	96.87%
- County Results; Shulze: 60–70% 70–80% 80–90% 90–100% Sergeant: 50–60%
Governor before election
John Andrew Shulze
Democratic
Elected Governor
John Andrew Shulze
Democratic

The 1826 Pennsylvania gubernatorial election occurred on October 10, 1826. Incumbent governor, John Andrew Shulze, defeated Federalist candidate John Sergeant by a wide margin.

== Results ==
Pennsylvania gubernatorial election, 1826
Party	Candidate	Votes	%
Jacksonian	John Andrew Shulze (incumbent)	72,710	96.87
Anti-Jacksonian	John Sergeant	1,175	1.57
N/A	Others	1,180	1.56
Total votes		75,065	100.00
