= Joseph Hiester =

American politician (1752–1832)

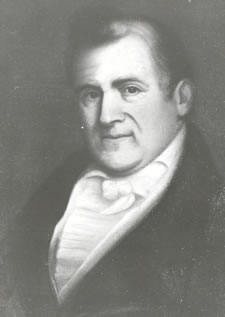

5th Governor of Pennsylvania
- In office December 19, 1820 – December 16, 1823
- Preceded by: William Findlay
- Succeeded by: John Andrew Shulze

Member of the U.S. House of Representatives from Pennsylvania
- In office December 1, 1797 – March 3, 1805
- Preceded by: George Ege
- Succeeded by: Isaac Anderson, John Whitehill and Christian Lower
- Constituency: 3rd district (1787–1803); 5th district (1803–1805)
- In office March 4, 1815 – December 1820
- Preceded by: Daniel Udree
- Succeeded by: Daniel Udree
- Constituency: 7th district

Member of the Pennsylvania House of Representatives
- In office 1787–1790

Member of the Pennsylvania Senate for the 17th district
- In office 1790–1794
- Preceded by: district created
- Succeeded by: Presley Carr Lane

Personal details
- Born: November 18, 1752 Bern Township, Province of Pennsylvania, British America
- Died: June 10, 1832 (aged 79) Reading, Pennsylvania, U.S.
- Resting place: Charles Evans Cemetery
- Party: Democratic-Republican
- Spouse: Elizabeth Whitman Hiester (1771–1825; her death)
- Children: 7

Joseph Hiester (November 18, 1752 – June 10, 1832) was an American politician, who served as the fifth governor of Pennsylvania from 1820 to 1823. He was a member of the Hiester family political dynasty, and was a member of the Democratic-Republican Party.

== Biography ==
Hiester was the son of John Hiester and Maria Barbara Epler. He received a common-school education when he was not working on the farm, and became a clerk in a store in Reading run by Adam Whitman. He became a partner in the store in 1771 when he married Elizabeth, Whitman's daughter. He owned slaves.

At the beginning of the American Revolutionary War, he raised and equipped in that town a company with which he took part in the battles of Long Island and Germantown. He was then promoted to colonel. He was captured and briefly confined in the prison ship "Jersey," where he did much to alleviate the sufferings of his fellow prisoners. Later he was transferred to New York City where he was exchanged.

He was a member of the convention of 1776 that drafted the Articles of Confederation, of the Pennsylvania state constitutional convention which ratified the United States Constitution, and of the state constitutional convention of 1790. He served in the Pennsylvania House of Representatives from 1787 to 1790 and the Pennsylvania Senate for the 17th district from 1790 to 1794. In 1807, he was appointed one of the two major generals to command the quota of Pennsylvania militia that was called for by the president. He served in the United States House of Representatives from 1797 until 1805, and again from 1815 until 1820, 14 years altogether. After Peter Muhlenberg resigned from the U.S. Senate in 1801, Hiester was one of two major candidates to replace him, but was overwhelmingly defeated by George Logan. In 1817, he ran for governor and was defeated by William Findlay. Hiester faced Findlay again in 1820 and narrowly won a single term in office. Refusing on principle to stand for reelection in 1823, he served until 1824 when he retired from public life. During his term, he presided over the dedication of the first state capitol building in the new capital of Harrisburg. He surprised partisans and opponents by making appointments strictly on merit rather than party affiliation.

He was known by the nickname of "Old German Grey" and spoke with a Pennsylvania Dutch German accent.

Initially buried at Reading's Reformed Church cemetery after his death in 1832, his remains were exhumed and reinterred at the Charles Evans Cemetery during the mid-19th century.

== Legacy ==
A residence hall on the Penn State University Park campus was named after him.

== Notes ==
Party political offices
Preceded by Isaac Wayne	Federalist nominee for Governor of Pennsylvania; 1817, 1820	Succeeded by Andrew Gregg
Pennsylvania House of Representatives
Preceded by	Member of the Pennsylvania House of Representatives; 1787–1790	Succeeded by
Pennsylvania State Senate
Preceded by district created	Member of the Pennsylvania Senate from the 17th district 1790–1794	Succeeded by Presley Carr Lane
U.S. House of Representatives
Preceded by George Ege	Member of the U.S. House of Representatives from Pennsylvania's 5th congressional district 1797–1803	Succeeded by Andrew Gregg
Preceded by Joseph Hemphill	Member of the U.S. House of Representatives from Pennsylvania's 3rd congressional district 1803–1805 alongside: Isaac Anderson and John Whitehill	Succeeded by Isaac Anderson; John Whitehill; Christian Lower
Preceded by Daniel Udree	Member of the U.S. House of Representatives from Pennsylvania's 7th congressional district 1815–1820	Succeeded by Daniel Udree
Political offices
Preceded by William Findlay	Governor of Pennsylvania; December 19, 1820 – December 16, 1823	Succeeded by John Andrew Shulze
