= Joseph Watson (mayor) =

American politician

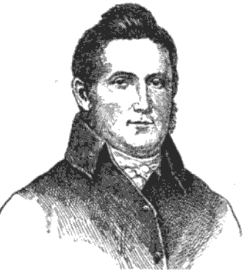

57th Mayor of Philadelphia
- In office October 19, 1824 – October 21, 1828
- Preceded by: Robert Wharton
- Succeeded by: George M. Dallas

Personal details
- Born: 1784 Bucks County, Pennsylvania, U.S.
- Died: April 9, 1841 (aged 55–56) Philadelphia, Pennsylvania, U.S.
- Party: National Republican

Joseph Watson (c. 1784 – April 9, 1841) was an American merchant and politician. He was the mayor of Philadelphia from 1824 to 1828. Watson was known for his efforts to help free blacks who had been kidnapped in Philadelphia and transported to southern plantations as slaves and in pursuing members of Patty Cannon's gang of kidnappers.

== Biography ==
Watson was born in 1784 in Bucks County to Isaac Watson, a carpenter, and Ann Jenks. Watson later became a lumber merchant in Philadelphia.

In 1822, Watson was elected as an alderman on the Common Council. In 1824, Robert Wharton completed what would be the last of his 14 terms in office and Watson was elected by the council in a 25-0 vote. As mayor, Watson had the duty of organizing Philadelphia's reception for the Marquis de Lafayette on his tour of the United States. He was re-elected in 1825 and 1826.

Watson was contacted by two men, John Hamilton and John Henderson. Both were southern plantation owners who had been approached by Jesse Cannon and Joe Johnson of the Cannon-Johnson Gang to buy Sam Scomp and Enos Tilghman. Scomp told of how he had been kidnapped from Philadelphia and transported to Mississippi. Another man, Cornelius Sinclair, had already been sold in Alabama. Watson worked to obtain affidavits from family and employers and the Pennsylvania Abolition Society joined to find documentation that the teenagers were indeed free. Sinclair was freed after Watson found a white resident who could travel to Alabama to testify on Sinclair's behalf. In the case of Scomp and Tilghman, Watson reached out to Richard Stockton, who was the Attorney General of Mississippi. Stockton was opposed to kidnapping free blacks, and informed Watson it was a matter of going to the Circuit Court with evidence. Johnson and Tilghman were later freed and placed on a ship to Philadelphia where they testified to Watson to let him determine that they were born free.

Watson then pursued the kidnappers. He issued a proclamation offering a reward of 500 dollars for the apprehension and prosecution of anyone involved in kidnapping free blacks in the city. Watson assigned his constable Samuel Garrigues, who had helped free the kidnapped slaves, to set out to arrest members of the Cannon Gang. One member of the gang was arrested in 1826. Garrigues traced one member of the gang, John Purnell, to Boston where he was arrested and changed with kidnapping. The two were initially acquitted, but Purnell was found guilty in Quarter sessions court with Sinclair, Scomp and Tilghman testifying against him..

Philadelphia did not have a regular police force, but the city appropriated $500 annually for police work in the city. By 1828, Watson had spent $2,500 on kidnapping cases. Although he was unsuccessful in bringing Patty Cannon to justice, he was able to get 10 kidnap victims released. He failed on two others because they could not find a white person who could testify that those individuals were born free. Although blacks could give testimony in Philadelphia courts, they were barred in courts of the slave states.

In the mayoral election of 1828, George M. Dallas was selected by the Select and Common Councils by a vote of 24 to 6. After his defeat, he continued to serve on the Common Council. In 1833, he was appointed to a commission to develop a police force in the city. In 1833, the city of Philadelphia unveiled a new police structure with four police districts each with a capitain, lieutenants and patrol officers. In 1835, he was again nominated as a candidate for mayor, but was defeated in the election by John Swift who took 19 votes of the council to 11 for Watson.

Watson was reported to have died on April 9, 1841.

Political offices
Preceded by Robert Wharton	Mayor of Philadelphia; 1824–1828	Succeeded by George M. Dallas
