= 1820 Pennsylvania gubernatorial election =

- October 10, 1820
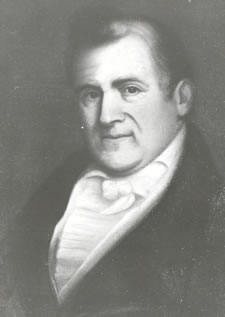

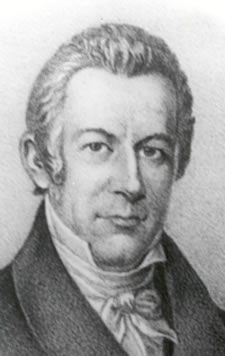
Nominee	Joseph Hiester	William Findlay
Party	Federalist	Democratic-Republican
Popular vote	68,242	66,766
Percentage	50.53%	49.44%
- County Results; Hiester: 50–60% 60–70% 70–80% Findlay: 40–50% 50–60% 60–70% 70–80%
Governor before election
William Findlay
Democratic-Republican
Elected Governor
Joseph Hiester
Federalist

The 1820 Pennsylvania gubernatorial election occurred on October 10, 1820. Incumbent Democratic-Republican governor William Findlay sought re-election but was defeated by U.S. Representative Joseph Hiester. Findlay entered the race with significantly reduced popularity. He had been renounced in the press as an opponent of democracy due to his nomination during the 1817 campaign by a group of party insiders. He additionally faced allegations of corruption over the misappropriation of funds during his tenure as State Treasurer, although all charges were dismissed during impeachment proceedings before the State Legislature. For this campaign, Findlay was nominated at a popular convention of Democratic Republicans; Hiester was selected at a separate convention of Federalists and "Old School Democrats" (i.e. allies of former governor Thomas McKean). The sour state of the economy was a key factor in the defeat of the incumbent, as Pennsylvania was reeling from the effects of the Panic of 1819.

== Results ==
Pennsylvania gubernatorial election, 1820
Party	Candidate	Votes	%
Federalist	Joseph Hiester	68,242	50.53
Democratic-Republican	William Findlay (incumbent)	66,766	49.44
N/A	Others	46	0.03
Total votes		135,054	100.00
