= 1817 Pennsylvania gubernatorial election =

- October 14, 1817
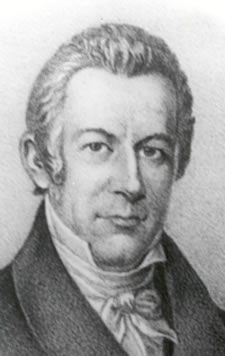

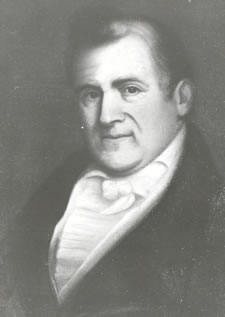
Nominee	William Findlay	Joseph Hiester
Party	Democratic-Republican	Federalist
Popular vote	66,420	59,417
Percentage	52.77%	47.21%
- County Results; Findlay: 50–60% 60–70% 70–80% 80–90% Hiester: 50–60% 60–70% 70–80%
Governor before election
Simon Snyder
Democratic-Republican
Elected Governor
William Findlay
Democratic-Republican

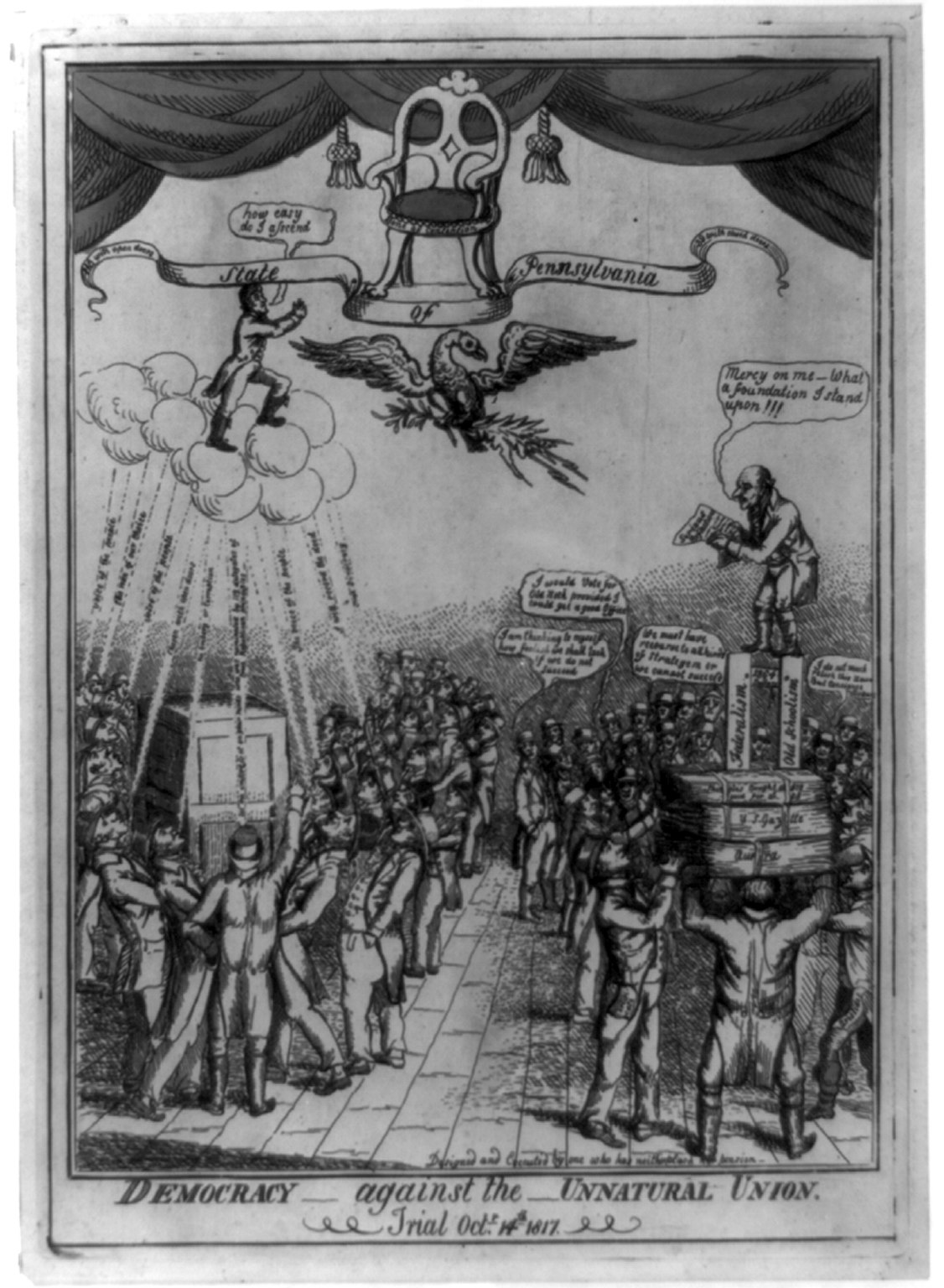
Political cartoon about the election

The 1817 Pennsylvania gubernatorial election occurred on October 14, 1817. Incumbent Democratic-Republican governor Simon Snyder was not a candidate for re-election. Simon's preferred successor, State Treasurer William Findlay, was nominated as the Democratic Republican candidate by a caucus of legislative leaders. Conversely, U.S. Representative Joseph Hiester was chosen as a candidate by the Democratic Republicans' first popular nominating convention; he additionally gained the endorsement of the declining Federalists.

The two men ran starkly different campaigns. Findlay sought to continue aggressive policies of infrastructural investment and economic intervention while maintaining the patronage system for governmental employment. Hiester, a former Revolutionary War captain, called for a reduction in spending, an expansion in liberal economic policies, and an investigation into corruption in state government. Findlay was ultimately victorious by an approximately six point margin, as his dominance in the state's rural counties counteracted support for Hiester in the cities.

== Results ==
Pennsylvania gubernatorial election, 1817
Party	Candidate	Votes	%
Democratic-Republican	William Findlay	66,420	52.77
Federalist	Joseph Hiester	59,417 (Note: Includes two votes for "Joseph Hester.")	47.21
None	Nathaniel Boileau	3	0.00
None	Nicholas Wiseman	3	0.00
None	Benjamin R. Morgan	2	0.00
None	Andrew Gregg	1	0.00
None	Aaron Hanson	1	0.00
None	Moses Palmer	1	0.00
None	Hiram Plum	1	0.00
None	John Seffer	1	0.00
None	Seth Thomas	1	0.00
Federalist	William Tilghman	1	0.00
None	Roswell Wells	1	0.00
Total votes		125,853	100.00
