= 1823 Pennsylvania gubernatorial election =

- October 14, 1823
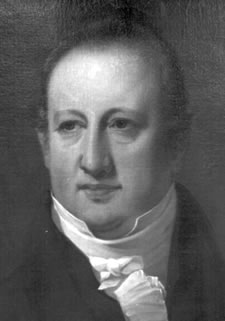

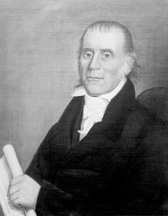
Nominee	John Andrew Shulze	Andrew Gregg
Party	Democratic-Republican	Federalist
Popular vote	89,928	64,211
Percentage	58.34%	41.66%
- County Results; Shulze: 50–60% 60–70% 70–80% 90–100% Gregg: 50–60% 60–70%
Governor before election
Joseph Hiester
Federalist
Elected Governor
John Andrew Shulze
Democratic-Republican

The 1823 Pennsylvania gubernatorial election occurred on October 14, 1823. Incumbent Federalist governor, Joseph Hiester, did not seek re-election. The Democratic-Republican candidate, John Andrew Shulze, defeated Federalist candidate Andrew Gregg.

== Results ==
Pennsylvania gubernatorial election, 1823
Party	Candidate	Votes	%
Democratic-Republican	John Andrew Shulze	89,928	58.34
Federalist	Andrew Gregg	64,211	41.66
Independent	John Glosander	4	0.00
Independent	N. B. Boileau	2	0.00
Independent	George Bryan	1	0.00
Federalist	Isaac Wayne	1	0.00
Total votes		154,147	100.00
