= Ovid F. Johnson =

American politician (1807–1854)

Ovid Fraser Johnson

Pennsylvania Attorney General
- In office January 15, 1839 – January 21, 1845
- Governor: David R. Porter
- Preceded by: William B. Reed
- Succeeded by: John K. Kane

Personal details
- Born: March 7, 1807 Wilkes-Barre, Pennsylvania, U.S.
- Died: February 10, 1854 (aged 46) Washington, D.C., U.S.
- Spouse: Jane Alricks
- Children: 4

Ovid Fraser Johnson (March 3, 1807 – February 10, 1854) was a Pennsylvanian lawyer, who served as state Attorney General.

He was born the son of Jehodia (or Jehoidia) Pitt Johnson and Hannah Fraser (or Frazer or Frazier). He was admitted to the bar of Luzerne county in 1831. He married Jane Alricks, a descendant of a New Netherland settler. They had four children. The one named after the father also became a lawyer.

Johnson was co-author, with Benjamin Parke, of A Digest of the Laws of Pennsylvania, from [7 Apr. 1830 to 15 Apr. 1835] (Harrisburg, 1836).

The 1838 election of Governor Porter led to the appointment of Johnson to state Attorney General when he was only 31 years old. Porter's re-election led to Johnson serving two terms. Johnson's most notable case was Prigg v. Pennsylvania, where Edward Prigg was tried by Pennsylvania for kidnapping a "fugitive slave", despite Prigg's acting under the terms of the Fugitive Slave Act of 1793. Johnson took the unusual view that the federal and state laws were actually compatible, a view that would be rejected by the Supreme Court.

Legal offices
Preceded by William B. Reed	Attorney General of Pennsylvania; 1839–1845	Succeeded by John K. Kane
