= Henry Hope Reed =

American educator (1808–1854)

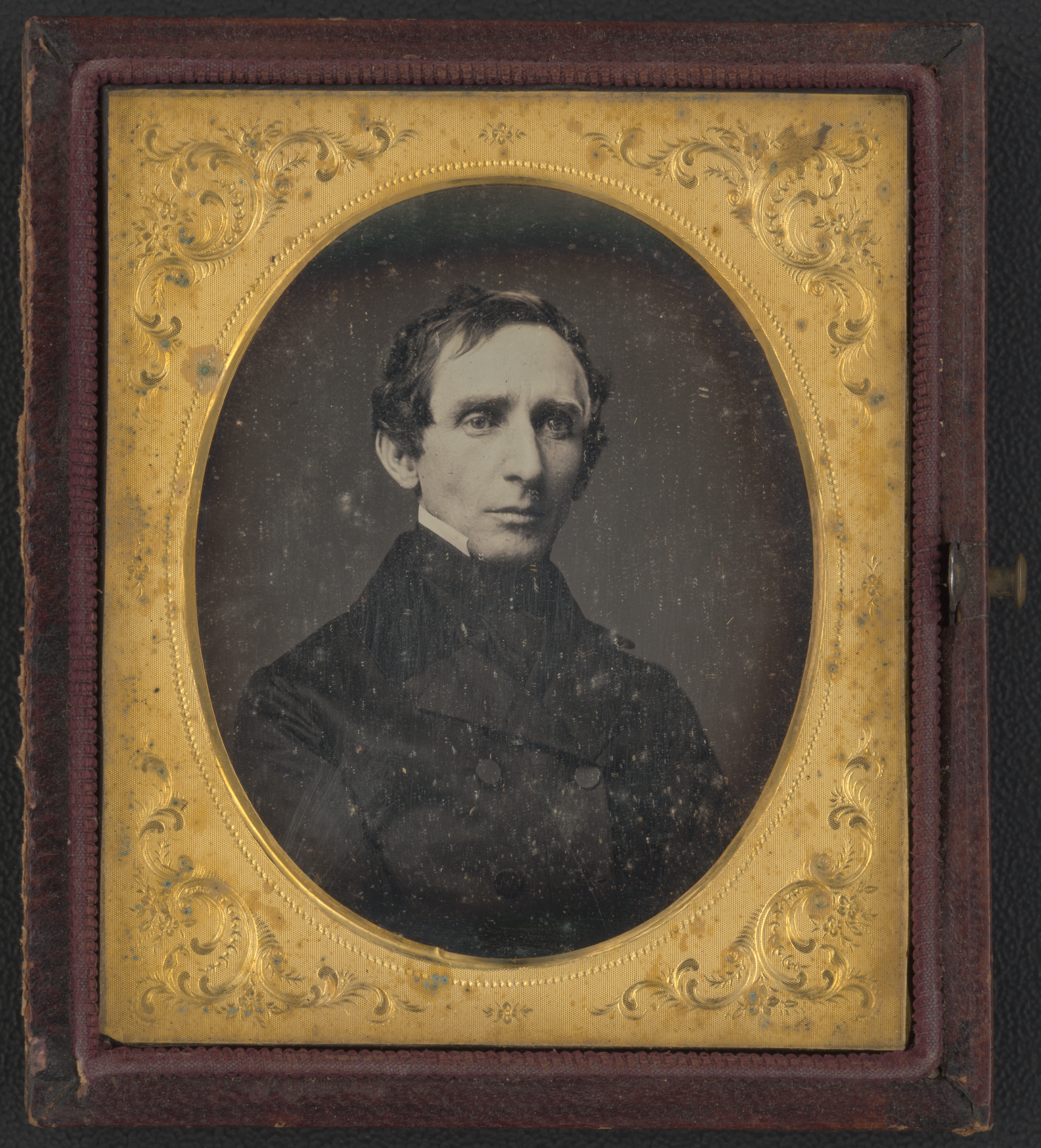
- Born: July 11, 1808
- Died: September 27, 1854 (aged 46)
- Occupation: Educator

Henry Hope Reed (11 July 1808 – 27 September 1854) was an American educator. He was considered the star of the faculty at University of Pennsylvania and was an early champion of poet William Wordsworth.

== Life and career ==
Reed graduated from the University of Pennsylvania in 1825, practiced law in Philadelphia, and was assistant-professor of moral philosophy in the University of Pennsylvania in 1831–1834 and professor of English literature and rhetoric there in 1835–1854. He assisted William Wordsworth in the preparation of an American edition of his poems in 1837, edited in America Christopher Wordsworth's Memoirs of William Wordsworth (1851) and published Lectures on English Literature from Chaucer to Tennyson (1855).

In 1838, Reed was elected as a member of the American Philosophical Society.

His brother was lawyer, politician and educator William Bradford Reed. Reed was married to Elizabeth White Bronson and had six children.

Reed died at sea when the SS Arctic sank returning to America from Europe. He was travelling with his sister-in-law, Anne Emily Bronson, who also died.
