= Cornelius Sinclair =

Free-born African American kidnapped by slave-traders

Cornelius Sinclair (c. 1813 to unknown) was an African American child kidnapped in Philadelphia in August 1825 by Patty Cannon's gang. He was one of a number of children kidnapped that summer and later transported south, to be sold into slavery. Sinclair was sold in Tuscaloosa, Alabama in October 1825 and subsequently freed in March 1827 through the efforts of several Methodist ministers, Robert L. Kennon and Joshua Boucher, who filed a lawsuit on his behalf. John Gayle of the Alabama Supreme Court presided over the trial, where a jury of slave-owners in Tuscaloosa found in favor of Sinclair's freedom. When he returned to Philadelphia he testified as part of the successful prosecution of one of his kidnappers. The African American newspaper the African Observer provided coverage of the efforts to free Sinclair and prosecute the kidnappers.
