= 1826 United States Senate election in Pennsylvania =

The 1826 United States Senate election in Pennsylvania was held on December 12, 1826. Isaac D. Barnard was elected by the Pennsylvania General Assembly to the United States Senate.

== Results ==
The Pennsylvania General Assembly, consisting of the House of Representatives and the Senate, convened on December 12, 1826, to elect a senator to serve the term beginning on March 4, 1827. Two ballots were recorded. The results of the second and final ballot of both houses combined are as follows:

State legislature results
Party	Candidate	Votes	%
Jacksonian	Isaac D. Barnard	108	81.20
Jacksonian	Samuel D. Ingham	11	8.27
Jacksonian	Joseph Hemphill	5	3.76
Jacksonian	James Buchanan	3	2.26
Jacksonian	Thomas Sergeant	1	0.75
N/A	Not voting	5	3.76
Totals		133	100.00%

Preceded by 1820-21	Pennsylvania U.S. Senate election (Class I); 1826	Succeeded by 1831
