= Isaac D. Barnard =

American politician (1791–1834)

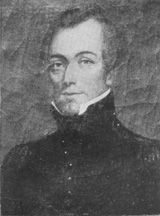

United States Senator from Pennsylvania
- In office March 4, 1827 – December 6, 1831
- Preceded by: William Findlay
- Succeeded by: George M. Dallas

Member of the Pennsylvania Senate from the 4th district
- In office 1820 – 1826
- Preceded by: Edward Coleman
- Succeeded by: Joshua Hunt

Personal details
- Born: Isaac Dutton Barnard; July 18, 1791 Aston Township, Pennsylvania
- Died: February 28, 1834 (aged 42) West Chester, Pennsylvania
- Resting place: Oaklands Cemetery
- Profession: Lawyer
- Committees: Committee on Militia

Military service
- Allegiance: United States
- Branch/service: United States Army; Militia
- Rank: Major general
- Unit: Fourteenth Regiment, United States Infantry
- Battles/wars: War of 1812

Isaac Dutton Barnard (July 18, 1791 – February 28, 1834) was an American militia leader, lawyer, and politician who served as a United States Senator for Pennsylvania from 1827 to 1831. He served as a Major in the U.S. Army during the War of 1812 and as a Pennsylvania State Senator for the 4th district from 1820 until 1826.

== Early life and education ==
Barnard was born is Aston Township, Pennsylvania to James and Susanna Dutton Barnard. The family name is derived from Roche-Bernard in Normandy, France where the family originated. Barnard's great-grandfather, Richard emigrated to Chester County, Pennsylvania prior to 1686.

Barnard worked as a scholar at several public schools. He lived in Philadelphia until 1811 and then moved to Chester, Pennsylvania.

== Military career ==
At age 20, Barnard received a commission as Captain of the Fourteenth Regiment, United States Infantry. He opened a recruitment station in West Chester, Pennsylvania. He fought in the War of 1812 and saw action at Baltimore, Sackett's Creek, the Canadien Frontier, Fort George, La Cole's Mill, the battle of Crysler's Farm, the Battle of Plattsburgh and Lyon's Creek. At Fort George, he was promoted from captain to major in the same unit for meritorious service.

He served as a Major General of the Pennsylvania State Militia.

== Political career ==
After the war ended he resumed his legal studies, and was admitted to the bar on May 1, 1816. He began practicing law in West Chester. Barnard was the deputy attorney general for Chester County from 1817 to 1821, and an Assistant Burgess in the government of the borough of West Chester in 1821, 1824, and 1825. Barnard was also a major-general of militia, and declined the judgeship of Chester County.

Barnard served as a member of the Pennsylvania State Senate for the 4th district from 1821 to 1826. He was instrumental in securing funds for a memorial to the Battle of Paoli.

The year he left the State Senate, he was the Secretary of the Commonwealth of Pennsylvania. He was elected to the United States Senate as a Jacksonian, and began his first term on March 4, 1827. During the 21st and 22nd United States Congresses, he was the chairman of the Committee on Militia. In 1829, Barnard was closely defeated in his attempt to gain the nomination for Governor of Pennsylvania. James Buchanan, at the time a U.S. Representative, described Barnard in a letter as "a high minded honest man" who will never "become the tool of any man".

He undertook part of a second Senate term, but resigned from the Senate on December 6, 1831, due to ill health. He was replaced by a future Vice President of the United States, George M. Dallas. Just before he resigned, the New York papers were reportedly demanding that Barnard be given a place in the United States Cabinet.

== Personal life ==
In 1820, Barnard married Harriet Darlington, the daughter of Isaac Darlington. She died during childbirth in 1823 and he never remarried.

== Legacy ==
Barnard died on February 28, 1834, in West Chester. He was originally interred at the Friends Burying Ground on North High Street but after twenty years he was re-interred in Oaklands Cemetery.

William Everhart, a wealthy merchant and friend of Barnard's, named a street in West Chester after Barnard sometime after the summer of 1830.

In 1854, a monument in Oaklands Cemetery was erected in his memory.

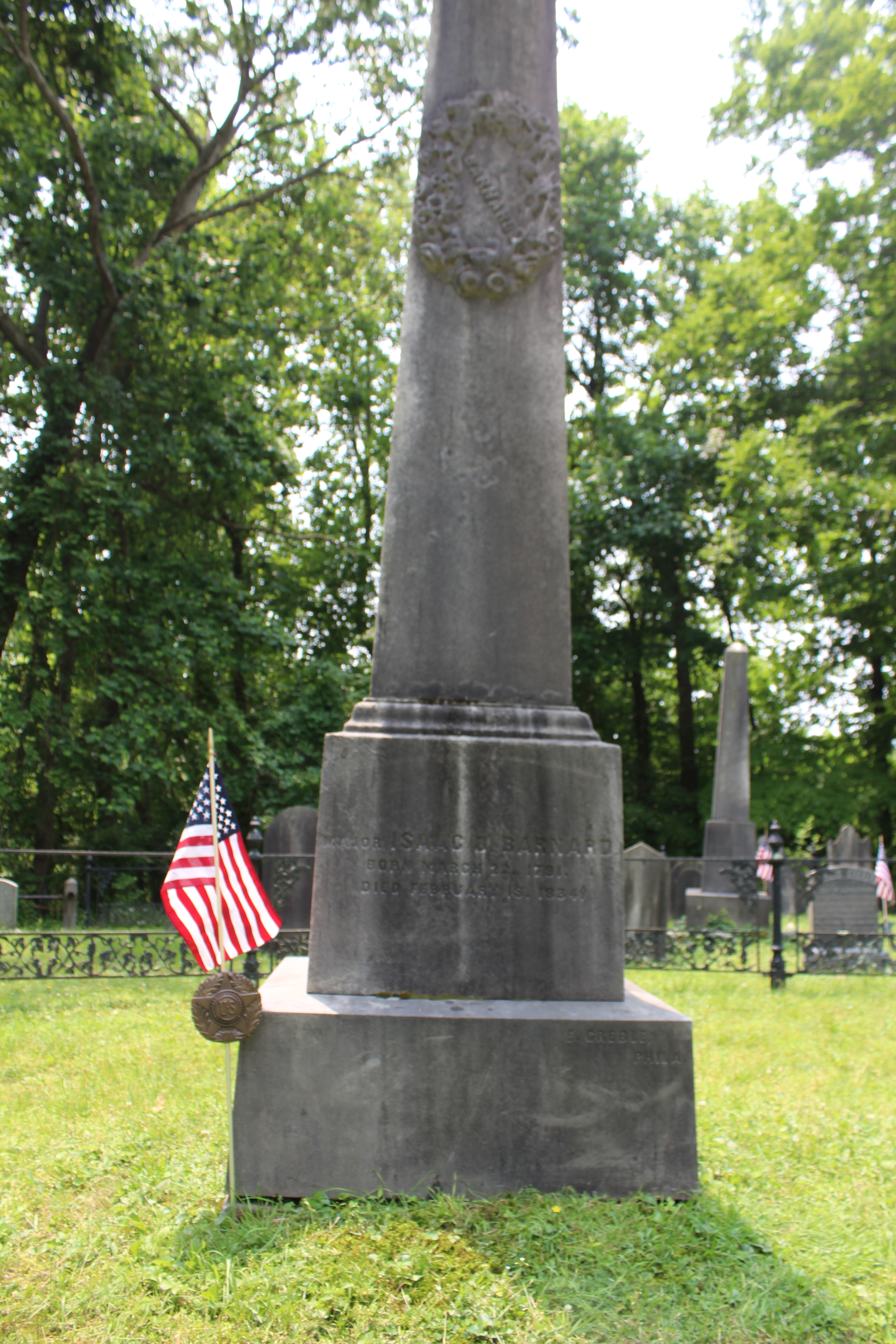
Front of the Isaac D. Barnard Memorial

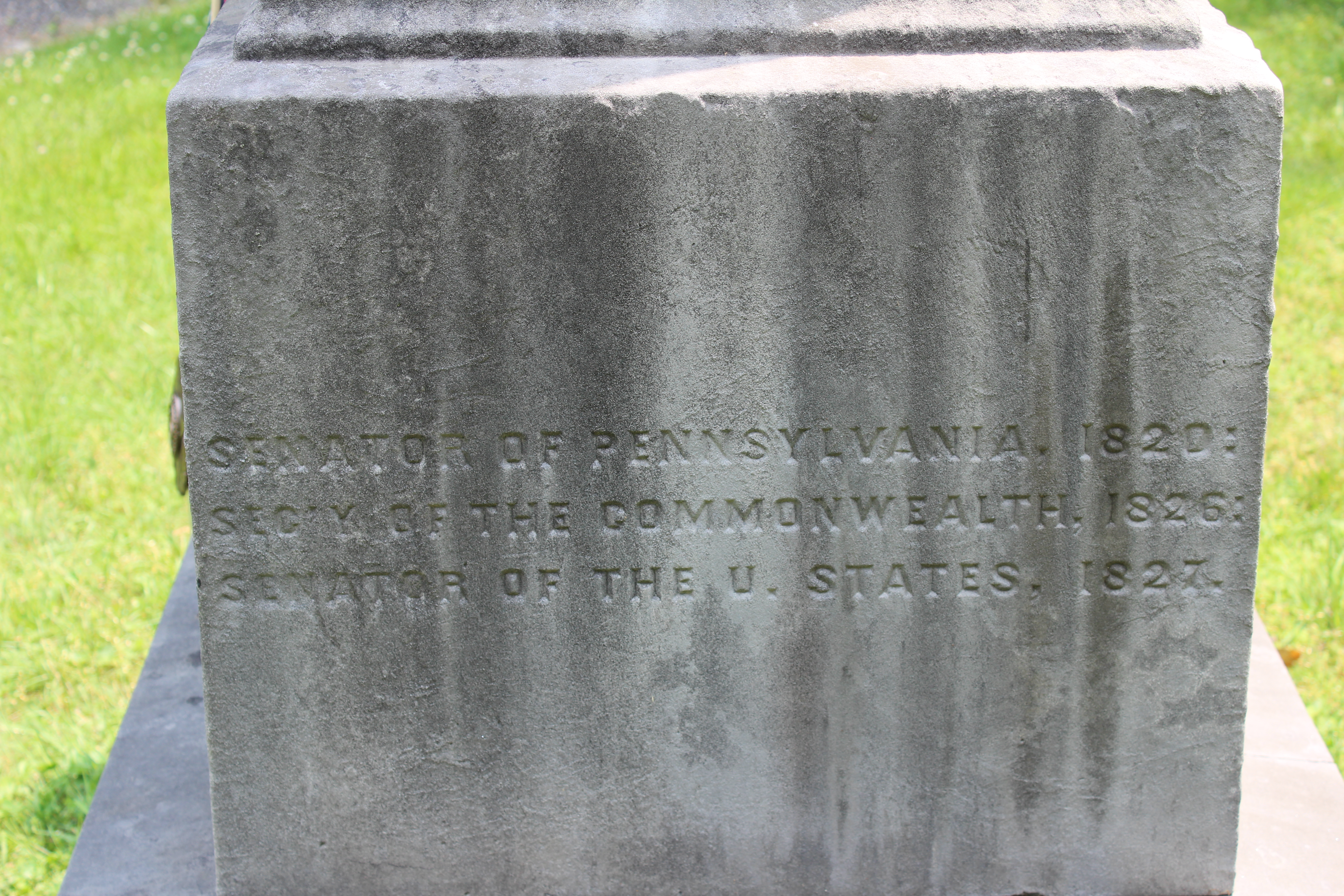
Right side of the Isaac D. Barnard Memorial

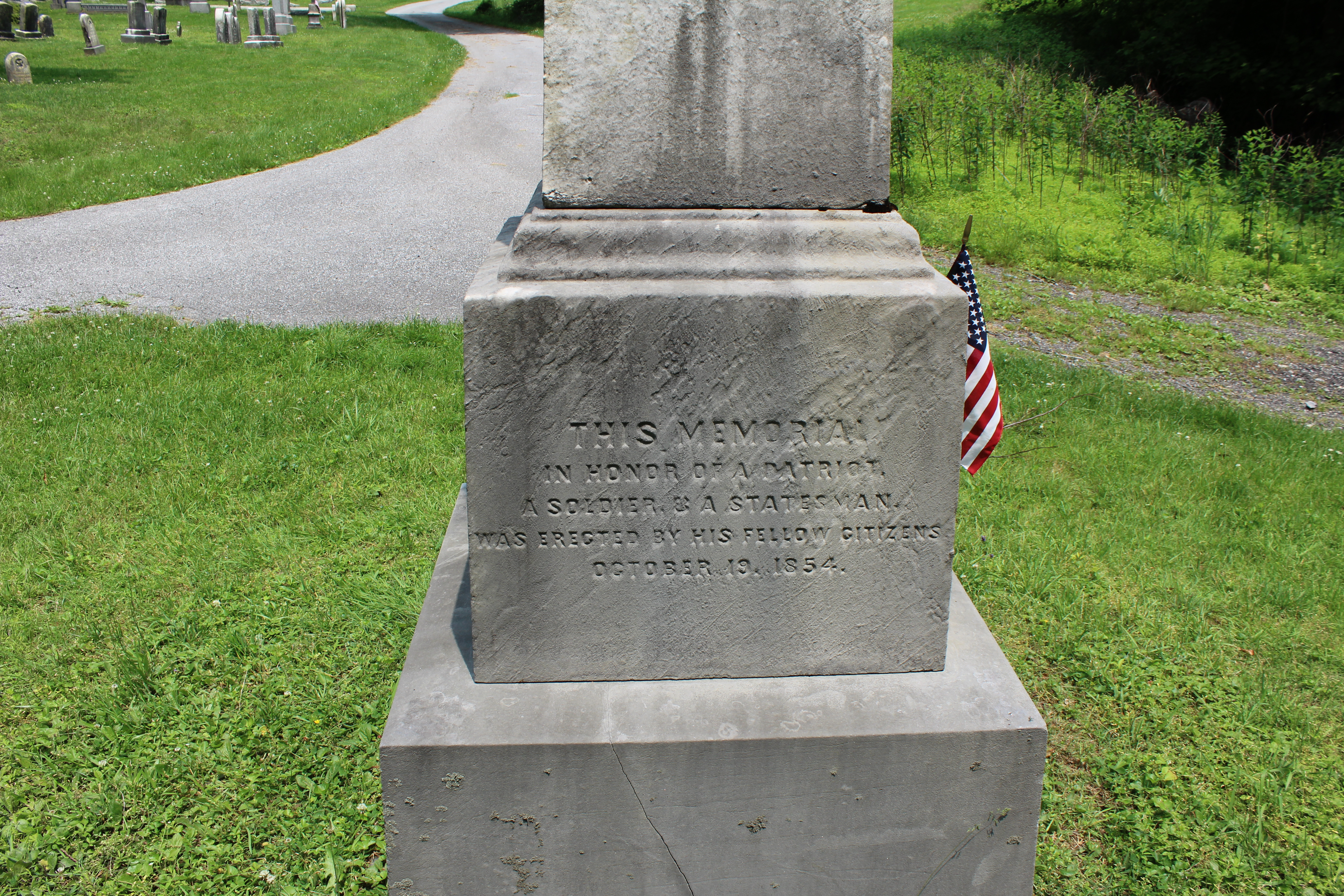
Back of the Isaac D. Barnard Memorial

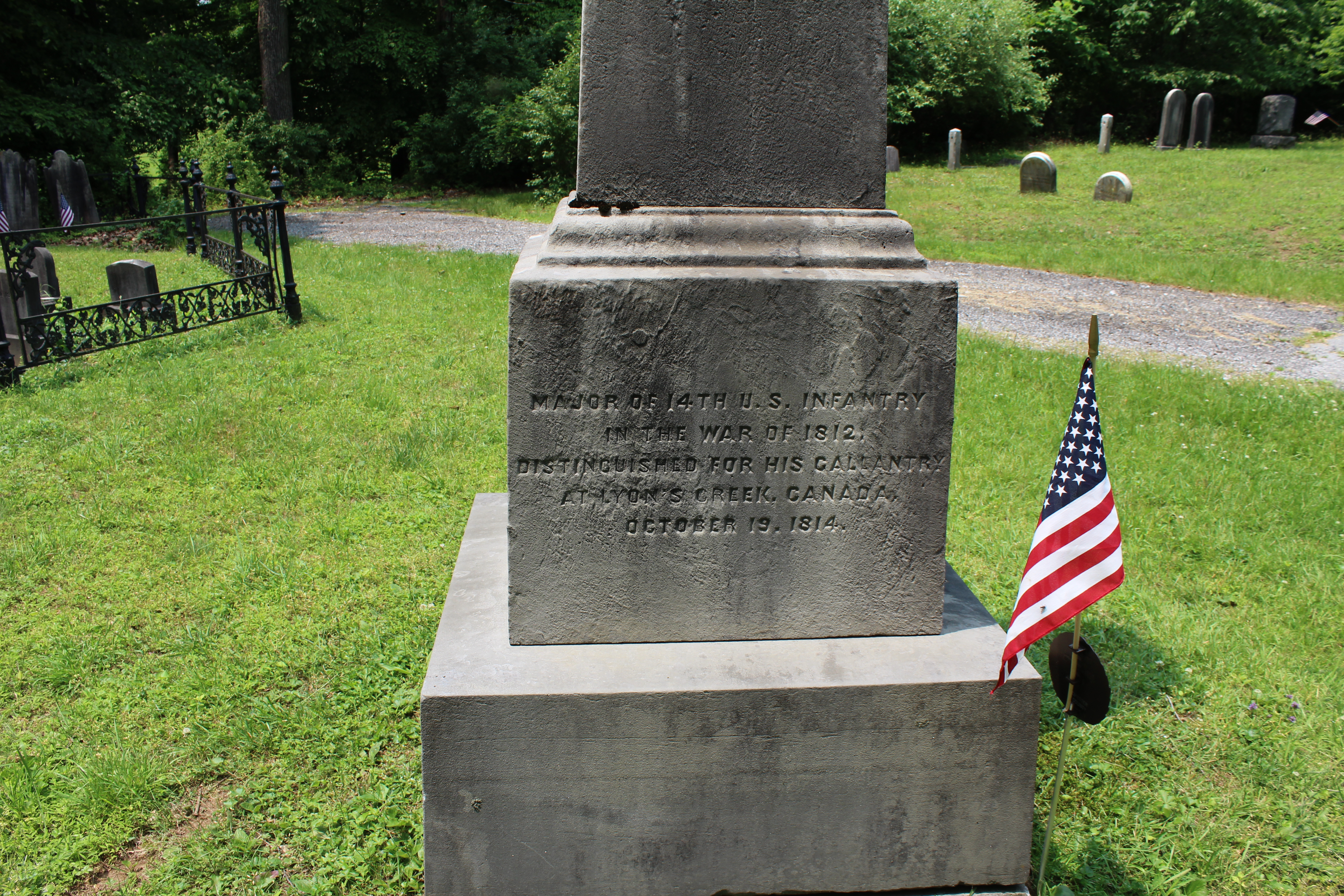
Left side of the Isaac D. Barnard Memorial

== Sources ==
- Pitt Jr., Thomas; Jim Jones. "West Chester Borough Officials: 1799-present".
- Sheppard, John (2007-06-02). "West Chester". Town & Country Living Magazines.
- Daily Local News (1899). West Chester, Past and Present. West Chester, Pennsylvania: Daily Local News. "isaac barnard."
- Wiley, Samuel (1893). Biographical and Portrait Cyclopedia of Chester County, Pennsylvania, comprising a historical sketch of the county. Philadelphia: Gresham Publishing Company.
- "Barnard, Isaac Dutton, (1791 - 1834)". United States Congress.

Pennsylvania State Senate
Preceded by Edward Coleman	Member of the Pennsylvania Senate, 4th district 1820-1826	Succeeded by Joshua Hunt
U.S. Senate
Preceded by William Findlay	U.S. senator (Class 1) from Pennsylvania; 1827–1831; Served alongside: William Marks, William Wilkins	Succeeded by George M. Dallas
