= Enoch Lewis (mathematician) =

American mathematician

Enoch Lewis.
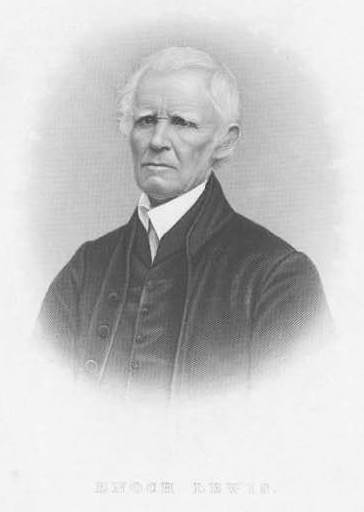
- Enoch Lewis
- Born: January 29, 1776; Radnor Township, Delaware County, Pennsylvania, U.S.
- Died: June 14, 1856 (aged 80); Philadelphia
- Scientific career
- Fields: Geometry, Conic Sections, Mathematics education, Land Surveyor
- Workplaces: William Penn Charter School, Westtown School

Enoch Lewis (born in Radnor Township, Delaware County, Pennsylvania 29 January 1776; died in Philadelphia, 14 June 1856) was a mathematician. He early exhibited a talent for mathematics, at the age of fourteen was usher in a country school, and at fifteen became principal. In the autumn of 1792 he removed to Philadelphia, studied mathematics, teaching half of each day to earn his support, and in 1795 was engaged as a surveyor in laying out towns in western Pennsylvania under the direction of Andrew Ellicott.

He belonged to the Society of Friends (Quakers) and he was teaching in the mathematical department in William Penn Charter School (Friends' academy) in Philadelphia, in 1796–1799, subsequently was mathematical tutor at the Westtown School, Pennsylvania, and in 1808 opened a private school for mathematical students in New Garden Township, Pennsylvania, which he successfully taught for several years.

In an article on early American mathematics journals, D.E. Zitarelli writes

We describe six of its major contributors, two of whom are known somewhat (Robert Adrain and Robert M. Patterson), but the other four seem to have slipped into obscurity in spite of accomplishments that deserve more recognition (William Lenhart, Enoch Lewis, John Gummere, and John Eberle).

He edited mathematical works of John Bonnycastle and Thomas Simpson, and he is well known for the first American edition of Thomas Simpson's Trigonometry with an appendix written by him using the initial E.L.

- Thomas Simpson: Trigonometry, Plane and Spherical: With the Construction and Application of Logarithms. With an appendix on spherical projections. First American edition. Philadelphia 1810.
- John Bonnycastle: An introduction to algebra; with notes and observations: designed for the use of schools and places of public education, Philadelphia, 1806 . and in the second edition in 1811 Lewis writes "errors of former editions and some improprieties in the original are corrected and removed".

He published an advanced textbook on spherical projections expanding the Appendix in Simpson's Trigonometry book.

- A Treatise on Plane and Spherical Trigonometry: Including the Construction of the Auxiliary Tables; a Concise Tract on the Conic Sections, and the Principles of Spherical Projection, Philadelphia, 1844 and reprinted in 1872.

In a review in The Friend it says

This valuable work supplies a vacuum which has long been known to exist in the list of mathematical works, suitable to our colleges and seminaries ... [and] many of the demonstrations are new

Enoch Lewis is an author of text books for schools and colleges:

- The arithmetical expositor, or, A treatise on the theory and practice of arithmetic: suited to the commerce of the United States : in two parts, Philadelphia 1824. Second edition came in 1929.
- The practical analyst; or, A treatise on algebra, containing the most useful parts of that science, illustrated by a copious collection of examples, designed for the use of schools. Philadelphia 1826 in four editions.

Other textbook that Lewis had a hand in producing was A Treatise on Surveying published in 1814 by Lewis’ former student, John Gummere (1784–1845) who acknowledged that several of the demonstrations were furnished by Lewis. 40 years after the first edition 17 editions had been published.
