= Juliet H. Lewis Campbell =

American poet and novelist

Portrait by John F. Francis

Juliet Hamersley Lewis Campbell (August 5, 1823 – December 26, 1898) was an American poet and novelist.

== Biography ==
She was born as Juliet Hamersley Lewis in Williamsport, Pennsylvania, the eldest child of Judge Ellis Lewis (1798–1871), later Pennsylvania Attorney General and Chief Justice of the Pennsylvania Supreme Court. She grew up in Towanda, Pennsylvania. She attended the Moravian Young Ladies' Seminary in Bethlehem, Pennsylvania, beginning in 1835. In 1842 she married lawyer and future United States Representative James Hepburn Campbell.

Campbell was a poet and her poems were included in several prominent anthologies. The American Female Poets (1848) by Caroline May included "Dreams", "A Confession", "Lines at Night", and "Tarpeia", The Female Poets of America (1849) by Rufus Wilmot Griswold included "Dreams", "Night-Blooming Flowers", and "A Story of Sunrise", and Read's Female Poets of America (1848) by Thomas Buchanan Read included "A Story of Sunrise" and "A Song of Sunset".

In 1862, she published the long poem Legend of Infancy of Our Savior: A Christmas Carol.

Campbell's only novel was Eros and Antieros; or, The Bachelor's Ward, published in 1857 under the name Judith Canute and published again the following year as The Old Love and the New under her own name. The hero of the novel, Arthur Walsingham, is a romantic poet and scholar in love with Viola, a woman married to his best friend. Viola and her husband die, leaving their daughter, also named Viola, in Walsingham's care. Much of the novel is dedicated to the younger Viola's upper class education, apparently intended to be an example for other women. When Viola is grown, she and Walsingham marry. The novel also extolls the virtues of the Susquehanna River and life in the vicinity of Lake Erie.

Portraits of Campbell by Thomas Sully and John Henry Brown are owned by the Historical Society of Pennsylvania.
