= James Hepburn Campbell =

American politician

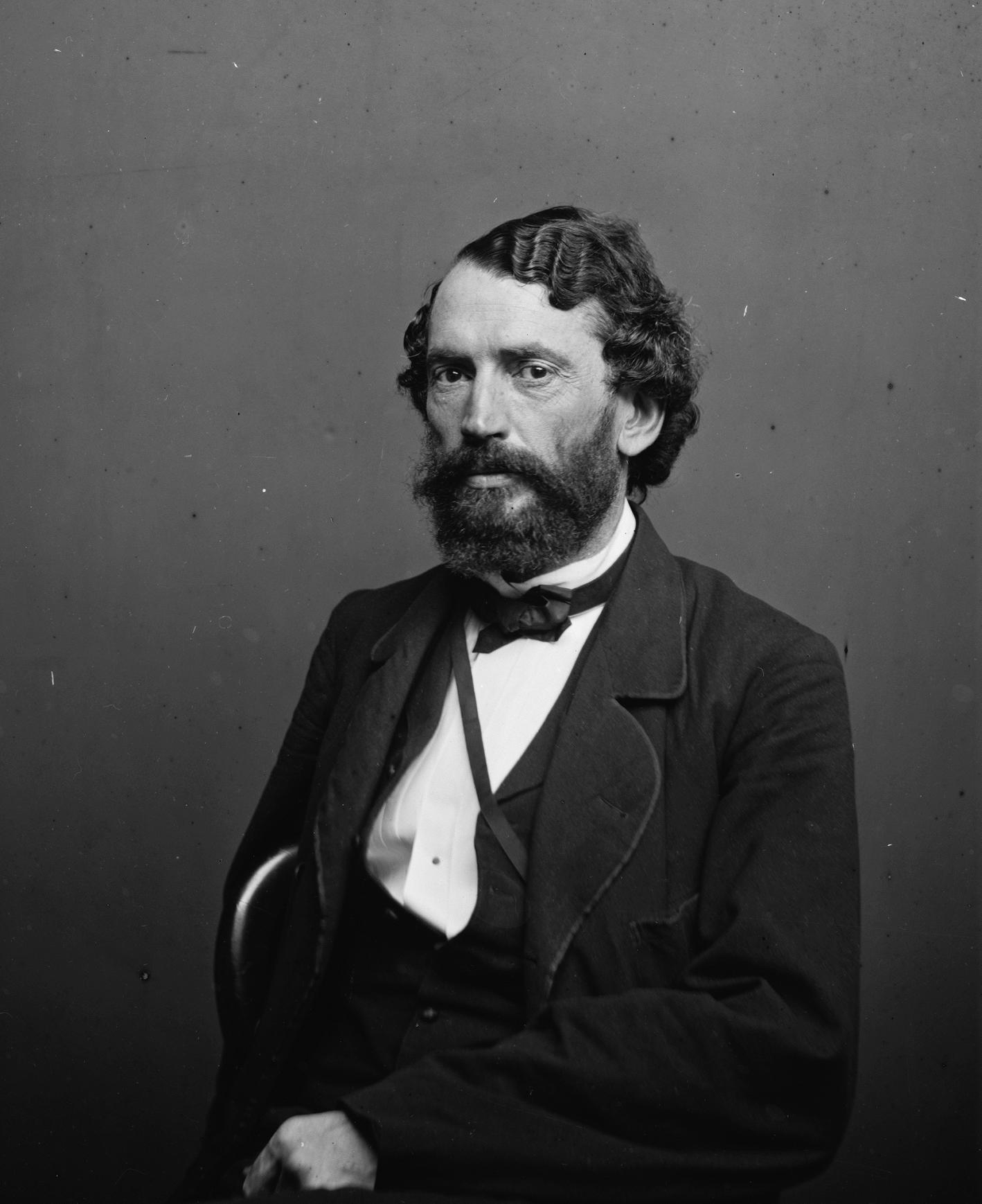
James Hepburn Campbell

James Hepburn Campbell (February 8, 1820 – April 12, 1895) was Whig and Republican member of the U.S. House of Representatives from Pennsylvania.

== Biography ==
James Hepburn Campbell was born in Williamsport, Pennsylvania. He graduated from the law department of Dickinson College in Carlisle, Pennsylvania, in 1841. He was admitted to the bar the same year and commenced practice in Pottsville, Pennsylvania. In 1842, he married author Juliet Hamersley Lewis, the daughter of Judge Ellis Lewis, Pennsylvania Attorney General and Chief Justice of the Pennsylvania Supreme Court. Campbell was a delegate to the 1844 Whig National Convention.

Campbell was elected as a Whig Party candidate to the Thirty-fourth Congress. He was an unsuccessful candidate for reelection in 1856 to the Thirty-fifth Congress. He was again elected as a Republican to the Thirty-sixth and Thirty-seventh Congresses. He was not a candidate for renomination in 1862.

During the American Civil War, Campbell served as major of the Twenty-fifth Regiment of Pennsylvania Infantry. He was appointed Minister to Sweden by President Abraham Lincoln in May 1864 and served until March 29, 1867. He declined the diplomatic mission to Colombia in 1867. He located in Philadelphia in 1867 and continued the practice of law. He died on his estate "Aeola," near Wayne, Pennsylvania, in 1895. He was interred in Woodlands Cemetery in Philadelphia.

U.S. House of Representatives
Preceded by Christian M. Straub	Member of the U.S. House of Representatives from Pennsylvania's 11th congressional district 1855–1857	Succeeded by William L. Dewart
Preceded by William L. Dewart	Member of the U.S. House of Representatives from Pennsylvania's 11th congressional district 1859–1863	Succeeded by Philip Johnson
Diplomatic posts
Preceded by Jacob S. Haldeman	U.S. Ambassador to Sweden; 1864–1867	Succeeded by John McGinnis, Jr.
