= General Todd =

General Todd may refer to:

- Henry D. Todd Jr. (1866–1964), U.S. Army major general
- John Blair Smith Todd (1814–1872), Union Army brigadier general
- Thomas H. Todd III (fl. 1980-2020s), U.S. Army lieutenant general
- W. Russell Todd (born 1928), U.S. Army major general

== See also ==
- Attorney General Todd (disambiguation)
