= Cornelius Darragh =

American lawyer and politician

Member of the U.S. House of Representatives from Pennsylvania's 21st congressional district
- In office March 26, 1844 – March 3, 1847
- Preceded by: William Wilkins
- Succeeded by: Moses Hampton

25th Attorney General of Pennsylvania
- In office January 4, 1849 – April 28, 1851
- Governor: William F. Johnston
- Preceded by: James Cooper
- Succeeded by: Thomas E. Franklin

Member of the Pennsylvania Senate for the 19th district
- In office 1838-1839

Member of the Pennsylvania Senate for the 21st district
- In office 1836-1837

Personal details
- Born: 1809 Pittsburgh, Pennsylvania, US
- Died: December 22, 1854 (aged 44–45) Pittsburgh, Pennsylvania, US
- Resting place: Allegheny Cemetery
- Education: Western University of Pennsylvania

Cornelius Darragh (1809 – December 22, 1854) was an American lawyer and politician from Pennsylvania who served as a Whig member of the Pennsylvania State Senate, a U. S. District Attorney, a member of the U.S. House of Representatives and as state Attorney General.

== Early life and education ==
Cornelius Darragh was born in Pittsburgh, Pennsylvania, one of six children to John Darragh, the 2nd Mayor of Pittsburgh and Margaret "Peggy" Calhoun. He attended the Western University of Pennsylvania, and graduated with the class of 1826. He studied law, was admitted to the bar in 1829 and commenced practice in Pittsburgh. In 1830, he married Mary Holmes Simpson. They had two daughters, Margaret Calhoun and Elizabeth Simpson.

== Career ==
He was a member of the Pennsylvania State Senate for the 21st district from 1836 to 1837 and the 19th district from 1838 to 1839. He was United States district attorney for the western district of Pennsylvania from 1841 to 1844. Darragh was elected as a Whig to the Twenty-eighth Congress to fill the vacancy caused by the resignation of William Wilkins. He was reelected to the Twenty-ninth Congress. He served as attorney general of Pennsylvania from January 4, 1849, to April 28, 1851.

Darragh died in Pittsburgh in 1854.

== Sources ==
- United States Congress. "Cornelius Darragh (id: D000061)". Biographical Directory of the United States Congress.
- The Political Graveyard

U.S. House of Representatives
Preceded by William Wilkins	Member of the U.S. House of Representatives from Pennsylvania's 21st congressional district 1844 - 1847	Succeeded by Moses Hampton
Legal offices
Preceded by James Cooper	Attorney General of Pennsylvania; 1849–1851	Succeeded by Thomas E. Franklin
