= John P. Elkin =

American politician (1860–1915)

Associate Justice of the Supreme Court of Pennsylvania
- In office January 2, 1905 – October 3, 1915

Attorney General of Pennsylvania
- In office January 18, 1899 – January 21, 1903
- Governor: William A. Stone
- Preceded by: Henry Clay McCormick
- Succeeded by: Hampton L. Carson

Personal details
- Born: January 11, 1860 West Mahoning Township, Indiana County, Pennsylvania
- Died: October 3, 1915 (aged 55) Philadelphia, Pennsylvania
- Party: Republican
- Spouse: Adda Prothero
- Children: 3
- Education: University of Michigan
- Occupation: Judge, lawyer

John Pratt Elkin (January 11, 1860 – October 3, 1915) was an American lawyer and judge. He served a term as the state's Attorney General, and as an associate justice of the state's Supreme Court. He was a central figure in a scandal concerning influence buying on the Supreme Court.

== Life and career ==
Elkin was born the son of Francis Elkin and Elizabeth Pratt. The family moved to the village of Smicksburg in 1869, where Elkin received a rudimentary education. In 1873, the family moved to Wellsville, Ohio, where the father opened a tin plate factory, and Elkin worked there in his early teens. In 1875, the factory failed, and the family moved back to Smicksburg, where Elkin was hired as a teacher.

In 1881, Elkin studied law at the University of Michigan, graduating in 1884. In 1884, he graduated, married Adda Prothero that summer, and was elected to the state House that fall. Elkin was admitted to the bar of Indiana County in 1885, and served two terms in the state House, 1885–86 and 1887–88.

Elkin was appointed Deputy Attorney General in 1895, which he resigned under pressure in 1897. He was also 1896 chairman of the state Republican committee, and had backed Senator Quay, the party's "kingmaker", for President.

Elkin was appointed Attorney General in 1899.

In 1902, Elkin tried to run for governor, and expected to win the Republican nomination on the first ballot, but Quay backed Judge Pennypacker and successfully bribed key Elkin supporters at the nomination convention.

In 1904, a vacancy arose on the state's Supreme Court. Governor Pennypacker was nominated by his party to run in the special election to replace the vacancy, but he declined. Elkin was then nominated and elected. Elkin served on the bench until his death in 1915.

== Controversies ==
The Secretary of the Commonwealth, Frank Reeder, and Elkin were forced to resign by Governor Hastings over an "indemnification" bill. The pressure was claimed to be political maneuvering against Quay.

In 1899, when Quay was tainted with scandal and the state legislature refused to seat him, Elkin was his main defender in the General Assembly, and advised Governor Stone to proceed with the appointment.

In 1908, William Randolph Hearst published letters sent to various Pennsylvania officials by John Dustin Archbold, then vice-president of Standard Oil, suggesting judicial appointments. The two letters addressed to Elkin mentioned $15,000 in donations.

== Sources ==
- "—". The Outlook. 57 (4): 205. September 25, 1897.
- "More Archbold Letters". The Independent. Oct 29, 1908. pp. 1009–10.
- "Standard Oil and the Judiciary". Hearst's Magazine. XXII (3): 2–16. September 1912.
- Blanchard, Charles (1900). The Progressive Men of the Commonwealth of Pennsylvania. Vol. 2. Logansport, Indiana: A. W. Bowen & Company.
- Hudson, Sam (1909). Pennsylvania and its Public Men. Philadelphia: Hudson & Joseph.
- Kehl, James A. (1981). Boss Rule in the Gilded Age: Matt Quay of Pennsylvania. University of Pittsburgh. ISBN 9780822976295.
- Pennypacker, Samuel W. (1918). The Autobiography of a Pennsylvanian . John C. Winston Company.

Legal offices
Preceded by Henry Clay McCormick	Attorney General of Pennsylvania; 1899–1903	Succeeded by Hampton L. Carson
