= Attorney General Todd =

Attorney General Todd may refer to:

- James Todd (lawyer) (1786–1863), Attorney General of Pennsylvania
- Moses Hampton Todd (1845–1935), Attorney General of Pennsylvania
