= Thomas Sergeant =

American politician and judge (1782-1860)

Member of the Pennsylvania House of Representatives
- In office 1812–1814

Secretary of the Commonwealth of Pennsylvania
- In office December 16, 1817 – July 6, 1819
- Preceded by: Nathaniel Boileau
- Succeeded by: Samuel D. Ingham

Pennsylvania Attorney General
- In office July 7, 1819 – December 20, 1820
- Governor: Amos Ellmaker; Thomas Elder
- Preceded by: Amos Ellmaker
- Succeeded by: Thomas Elder

Associate Justice, Supreme Court of Pennsylvania
- In office February 3, 1834 – 1846

Personal details
- Born: January 14, 1782 Philadelphia, Pennsylvania, U.S.
- Died: May 8, 1860 (aged 78) Philadelphia, Pennsylvania, U.S.
- Resting place: Laurel Hill Cemetery, Philadelphia, Pennsylvania, U.S.
- Spouse: Sarah Bache
- Children: 4 survived to adulthood
- Relatives: Jonathan Dickinson Sergeant (father); John Sergeant (brother)

Thomas Sergeant (January 14, 1782 – May 8, 1860) was an American politician and judge. He served as a member of the Pennsylvania House of Representatives from 1812 to 1814, Secretary of the Commonwealth of Pennsylvania from 1817 to 1819, Pennsylvania Attorney General from 1819 to 1820, and as an associate justice of the Supreme Court of Pennsylvania from 1834 to 1846.

== Early life and education ==
Sergeant was born in Philadelphia, Pennsylvania, on January 14, 1782, to Jonathan Dickinson Sergeant and Margaret Spencer. He graduated from the College of New Jersey (now known as Princeton University) in 1798 in the same class as his twin brother. He read law under Jared Ingersoll, and was admitted to the Philadelphia bar in 1802.

In 1812, he married Sarah Bache, a daughter of Sarah Franklin Bache, who was a daughter of Benjamin Franklin. Their children were Henry Jonathan, Emma, Frances, Thomas Jr., and William, who died in infancy. His grandson, by Frances, was the scholar and linguist Thomas Sergeant Perry.

== Career ==
He served as a member of the Pennsylvania House of Representatives for two terms from 1812 to 1814. From 1814 to 1817, he was an associate judge of the District Court of Philadelphia. From 1817 to 1819 he was Secretary of the Commonwealth. From 1819 to 1820 he was state Attorney General.

From 1828 to 1832, he was postmaster of Philadelphia. In 1831, Sergeant was elected as a member to the American Philosophical Society. From 1834 to 1846 he served as an associate justice of the state Supreme Court. Upon resigning, he resumed private practice. He was president of the Law Academy and a trustee of the University of Pennsylvania.

Sergeant wrote several books on Pennsylvania law.

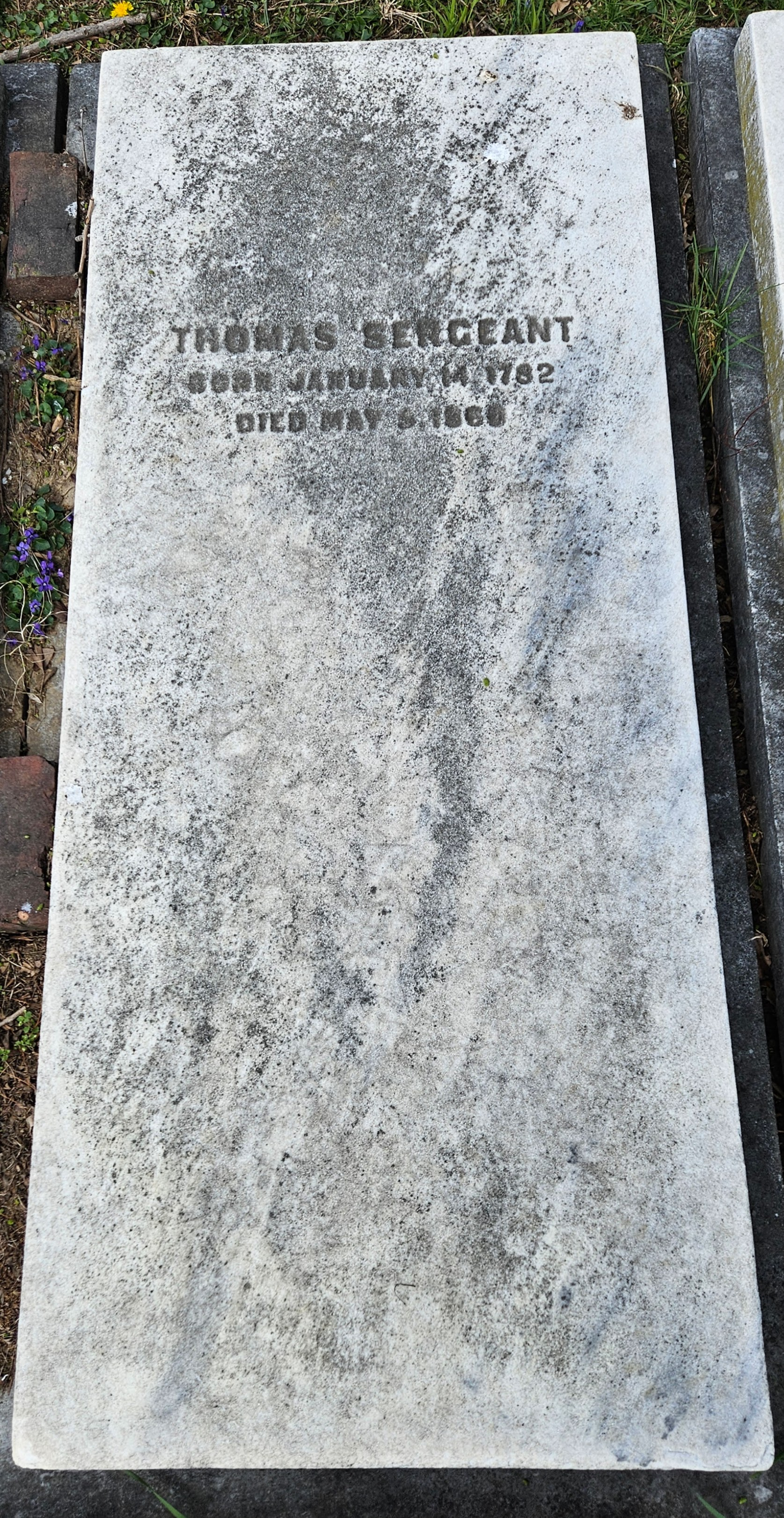
Thomas Sergeant tombstone in Laurel Hill Cemetery

He died on May 8, 1860, and was interred at Laurel Hill Cemetery in Philadelphia.

== Publications ==
- Constitutional Law: Being a View of the Practice and Jurisdiction of the Courts of the United States, and of Constitutional Points Decided., Philadelphia: P.H. Nicklin and T. Johnson, 1830
- View of the Land Laws of Pennsylvania, with Notices of its Early History and Legislation, Philadelphia: James Kay, Jun. and Brother, 1838
- Reports of Cases Adjudged in The Supreme Court of Pennsylvania, Philadelphia: Thomas Davis, 1846

Legal offices
Preceded by Amos Ellmaker	Pennsylvania Attorney General; 1819–1820	Succeeded by Thomas Elder
