= Cumbola, Pennsylvania =

Unincorporated community in Pennsylvania, US

- Census-designated place
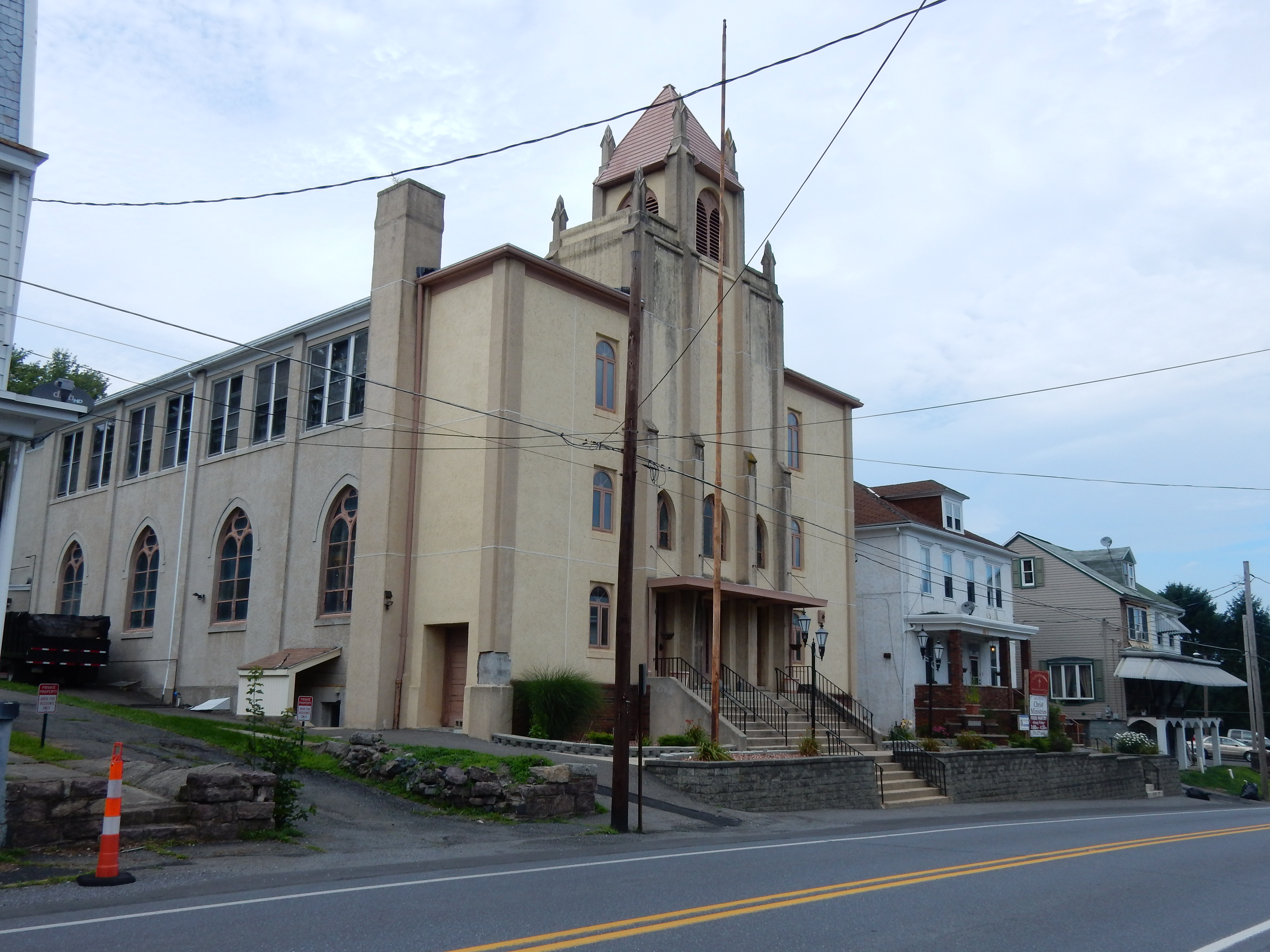
- Market Street (U.S. Route 209) in Cumbola. New Life In Christ Ministries.

- Location within Pennsylvania Location within the United States
- Coordinates: 40°42′42″N 76°08′18″W
- Country: United States
- State: Pennsylvania
- County: Schuylkill

Area
  - Total: 0.40 sq mi (1.03 km^{2})
  - Land: 0.40 sq mi (1.03 km^{2})
  - Water: 0 sq mi (0.00 km^{2})

Population (2020)
  - Total: 371
  - Density: 932.5/sq mi (360.05/km^{2})
- Time zone: UTC-5 (Eastern (EST))
  - Summer (DST): UTC-4 (EDT)
- ZIP code: 17930
- Area code: 570
- FIPS code: 42-17680

Cumbola is a Village and census-designated place located in Blythe Township, Schuylkill County in the state of Pennsylvania, United States. The community is located between the boroughs of New Philadelphia and Port Carbon along U.S. Route 209. As of the 2010 census the population was 443 residents.

== Demographics ==
Historical population
Census	Pop.	Note	%±
2020	371		—
U.S. Decennial Census
