= Emlen Franklin =

American politician (1827–1891)

Member of the Pennsylvania House of Representatives from the Lancaster County district
- In office 1855–1856 Serving with Daniel W. Witmer, Hugh M. North, Jacob L. Gross, John F. Herr

Personal details
- Born: April 7, 1827 Lancaster, Pennsylvania, U.S.
- Died: June 19, 1891 (aged 64) Lancaster, Pennsylvania, U.S.
- Resting place: Woodward Hill Cemetery; Lancaster, Pennsylvania, U.S.
- Party: Whig
- Spouse: Clara A. Withers
- Children: 3, including Walter
- Parent: Walter Franklin (father)
- Relatives: Thomas E. Franklin
- Education: Yale College
- Occupation: Politician; lawyer; military officer

Emlen Franklin (April 7, 1827 – June 19, 1891) was an American politician, lawyer and military officer from Pennsylvania. He served as a member of the Pennsylvania House of Representatives, representing Lancaster County in 1855.

== Early life ==
Emlen Franklin was born as the youngest son of Anne (née Emlen) and Judge Walter Franklin on April 7, 1827, in Lancaster, Pennsylvania. His brother was Thomas E. Franklin. He studied at Franklin Institute in Lancaster. He graduated from Yale College in 1847. He read law with Nathan Ellmaker of Lancaster and was admitted to the bar on April 15, 1850.

== Career ==
Following admission to the bar, Franklin practiced law in Lancaster. In the autumn of 1854, he was elected as a Whig to the Pennsylvania House of Representatives and served in 1855. He did not run for re-election. From 1859 to 1861, he was district attorney of Lancaster County. He resigned the position at the start of the American Civil War.

Following the outbreak of the war, Franklin volunteered as a captain of company F of the 1st Pennsylvania Infantry Regiment, which mustered on April 20, 1861. He served for three months until the company was mustered out on July 23. In July 1862, following a call from Governor Andrew Gregg Curtin, he raised the 122nd Regiment of Pennsylvania Volunteers and was selected as colonel. He served in Washington, D.C., and served as provost marshal of the city. With the company, he participated in the battles of Fredericksburg and Chancellorsville. The regiment acted as an escort at the funeral of Amiel Weeks Whipple in Harrisburg and it mustered out on May 15 or 16, 1863. He commanded the regiment for nine months, the full length of its service. Following the company's disbanding, he rejoined as a member of the 135th Pennsylvania Infantry and it joined the Army of the Potomac. On May 15, 1863, he returned home and in June, following the invasion by Lee, he raised a regiment of militia in Lancaster County, which included many from his old 122nd Regiment. They were positioned on the Susquehanna River. Following the Battle of Gettysburg, the regiment went to Carlisle and Chambersburg, and Franklin became colonel of a brigade. The regiment disbanded in July 1863. He was a member of the George H. Thomas Post, No. 84, of the Grand Army of the Republic.

Following the war, Franklin continued practicing law. He was elected register of wills of Lancaster County. He served in the role from December 1, 1863, to December 1, 1866. In 1872 and 1874, he ran for the U.S. Congress, but was defeated by A. Herr Smith.

== Personal life ==
Franklin married Clara A. Withers, daughter of Michael Withers, of Lancaster. They had two sons and one daughter, Walter W., Emlen A. and Josephine "Josie". His son Walter was a member of the Pennsylvania legislature.

Franklin died on June 19, 1891, at his home on West Vine Street in Lancaster. He was interred in Woodward Hill Cemetery in Lancaster.
