= Thomas Elder (lawyer) =

American lawyer

Pennsylvania Attorney General
- In office December 20, 1820 – December 18, 1823
- Governor: Joseph Hiester
- Preceded by: Thomas Sergeant
- Succeeded by: Frederick Smith

Personal details
- Born: January 30, 1767; Paxton Township, Dauphin County, Pennsylvania
- Died: April 29, 1853 (aged 86); Harrisburg, Pennsylvania
- Resting place: Harrisburg Cemetery
- Spouses: Catherine Cox; Elizabeth Shippen Jones
- Children: 1,3 (survived to adulthood)

Thomas Elder (January 30, 1767 – April 29, 1853) was a Pennsylvania lawyer and Harrisburg businessman. He served one term as state Attorney General.

His residence after 1835 was the former mansion of the Harris family. It is currently known as the Simon Cameron House and is a National Historic Landmark.

== Early life ==
Elder was born the son of the Reverend John Elder and his second wife, Mary Simpson. The senior Elder was born, raised, and educated in Edinburgh. In Paxtang, Pennsylvania, he became known as the "Fighting Pastor" for organizing an anti-Indian militia, known as the Paxton Boys.

== Career ==
He was educated at the Academy of Philadelphia, and admitted to the Dauphin County bar in 1791. He volunteered to help suppress the Whiskey Rebellion but declined commissions until afterwards, when he was made lieutenant colonel. He practiced law for over forty years. He was active in Harrisburg affairs and was notably "the prominent and leading spirit" behind organizing the Harrisburg Bridge Company, which built (1814-1820) and ran the first Susquehanna-spanning bridge. He was elected (1816) and re-elected by the directors as the company's first president until he resigned in 1846. He was president of the Harrisburg Bank from 1816 until his death.

Elder served as state Attorney General from 1820 to 1823. Afterwards, he always refused political offices although he maintained an interest in politics. William Henry Harrison's "log cabin campaign" was a suggestion of Elder.

== Personal life ==
Elder married Catherine Cox in 1799. A daughter, Mary R., would later marry Amos Ellmaker. Catherine died in 1810. Elder then married Elizabeth Shippen Jones in 1813, who would outlive him.

== Notes ==
Legal offices
| Preceded by Thomas Sergeant | Attorney General of Pennsylvania; 1820–1823 | Succeeded by Frederick Smith |
