= James Campbell (postmaster general) =

American politician

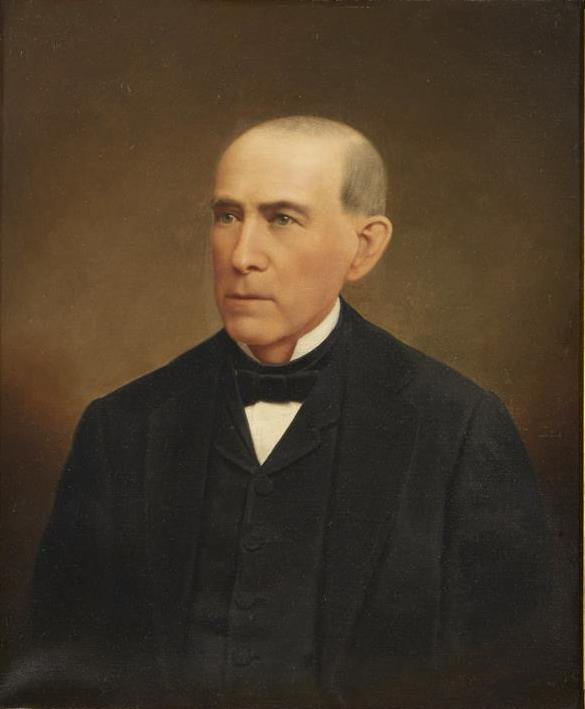

16th United States Postmaster General
- In office March 7, 1853 – March 4, 1857
- President: Franklin Pierce
- Preceded by: Samuel Dickinson Hubbard
- Succeeded by: Aaron V. Brown

Attorney General of Pennsylvania
- In office January 21, 1852 – March 8, 1853
- Governor: William Bigler
- Preceded by: Thomas Franklin
- Succeeded by: Francis Wade Hughes

Personal details
- Born: September 1, 1812 Philadelphia, Pennsylvania, U.S.
- Died: January 27, 1893 (aged 80) Philadelphia, Pennsylvania, U.S.
- Party: Democratic

James Campbell (September 1, 1812 – January 27, 1893) was a politician from Philadelphia, Pennsylvania. He served as Attorney-General of Pennsylvania and United States Postmaster General during the presidency of Franklin Pierce.

== Birth, education and early career ==
Born in Philadelphia, his father was Anthony Campbell, and his grandfather was George Campbell, a native of Fintona, County Tyrone, Ireland. James was educated at the private school of Geraldus Stockdale, studied law with Hon. Robert D. Ingraham, and was admitted to the Bar on September 14, 1833. He was made a commissioner of the district of Southwark the day after his admission, and served until his appointment to the board of education. He offered on April 16, 1840, the resolution which established the Girls' High School of Philadelphia.

He served on the board of education until 1840, when he was appointed, by Governor David R. Porter, judge of the courts of common pleas, orphan's court, and courts of oyer and terminer, which position he filled until January 1, 1851, when the judicial positions in Pennsylvania became elective.

== Further political career ==
After the state's constitution was amended in 1850 to allow elected judges, he was nominated for the Supreme Court, at a period when Know-Nothingism and anti-Catholic feeling was rife. More than two-thirds of the party's state convention ratified the choice to nominate him, but he lost his election 179,238 to 176,101, although his four colleagues on the Democratic ticket were elected. James Buchanan remarked to a friend in Pennsylvania, "It would be a sad affair for the party, should Campbell fail & the remainder of the Judicial ticket be elected. He is the first Catholic, I believe, who has ever been upon a ticket for a State office & he is worthy & well qualified. Should he fail, this will be attributed to his religious faith; of course, [this would] very naturally exasperate the Catholic democrats. I hope our friends every where will bear this in mind. You exercise a potent influence & can do much to prevent such a catastrophe."

Governor William Bigler appointed him Attorney-General of Pennsylvania, in which office he served until March 4, 1853, when he entered President Pierce's Cabinet as Postmaster-General, serving until March 4, 1857. Campbell's Cabinet service was a reward to the faction of the Democratic Party that supported James Buchanan in the 1852 presidential nomination convention. Furthermore, as a Catholic, Campbell's nomination helped Pierce reach out to new voters from Ireland.

In 1863 he was a candidate for the United States Senate but lost the Democratic nomination to Charles R. Buckalew. In 1873 he was elected a member of the Constitutional Convention of Pennsylvania, but declined to serve, owing to the condition of his health.

For twenty-five years he was president of the board of trustees of Jefferson Medical College, and for forty-five years was vice-president of Saint Joseph's Orphan Asylum (the oldest incorporated Roman Catholic asylum in the United States, chartered in 1807.)

On September 3, 1869, he was appointed by the judges of Philadelphia County a member of the board of city trusts, which has under its care 42 city trusts, including Girard College and Wills Eye Hospital. He served in these positions until his death.

Judge Campbell looked upon his obligations, whether as public official or as trustee, as duties of the highest order and of great value to society, and he was a just and severe judge upon himself as to the manner and the faithfulness with which these duties were discharged. Even with all the cares that surrounded him, he was always ready to respond to the slightest call from any of the refuges of the poor and the ill. He made visits almost daily to St. Joseph's Orphan Asylum, to Girard College, and to the hospital, examining conditions in detail, and considering them with as much care as if they referred to his own life or to the lives of those of his own household.

Campbell died in Philadelphia. He was the last surviving member of Pierce's cabinet.

== Dedications ==
In 1959 Allegheny Square Park in the Port Richmond section of Philadelphia was renamed Campbell Square in his honor. The park is located on Allegheny Avenue between Almond and Belgrade Streets. Park maintenance continues through Friends of Campbell Square.

Legal offices
Preceded by Thomas E. Franklin	Attorney General of Pennsylvania; 1852–1855	Succeeded by Francis Wade Hughes
Political offices
Preceded by Samuel Dickinson Hubbard	United States Postmaster General; Served under: Franklin Pierce; 1853 – 1857	Succeeded by Aaron V. Brown
