= John C. Knox (Pennsylvania judge) =

American politician

John Colvin Knox

Pennsylvania Supreme Court
- In office May 23, 1853 – January 19, 1858
- Succeeded by: William A. Porter

Attorney General of Pennsylvania
- In office January 19, 1858 – January 16, 1861
- Governor: William F. Packer
- Preceded by: Thomas E. Franklin
- Succeeded by: Samuel A. Purviance

Personal details
- Born: February 18, 1817 Knoxville, Tioga County, Pennsylvania
- Died: August 26, 1880 (aged 63) Wellsboro, Tioga County, Pennsylvania
- Spouse: Adaline Kilburn
- Profession: Attorney, Judge

John Colvin (or Colton) Knox (February 18, 1817 – August 26, 1880) was a Pennsylvania lawyer and judge. He served as an associate justice of the state Supreme Court and a term as state Attorney General.

== Biography and career ==
Knox was born the son of William Knox and Sally Colvin. His father died in 1832, his mother in 1835, and Knox was mostly self-educated. He rose extremely rapidly in the legal profession. He served as a deputy attorney general 1840–1842, and was sent to the state legislature in 1845, which he left early when appointed president judge for various districts in western Pennsylvania. He was elected to the state Supreme Court in 1851, which he left when appointed state Attorney General, 1858–1861. He co-authored during that time a revision of the Pennsylvania Penal Code. Knox was an ardent abolitionist who defended Passamore Williams after Williams was charged with violating the Fugitive Slave Act. For this reason, General Joseph Holt and Secretary of War Edwin Stanton welcomed his commission as a judge advocate in the United States Army during the Civil War.

After the war, Knox went into private practice in Philadelphia. He came down with "paralysis of the brain" and had to retire, and lived helplessly until his death.

== Ira Kilburn Knox ==
Knox's oldest son, Kilburn, had completed two years at the University of Pennsylvania when the Civil War broke out. He withdrew from college and enlisted. At the end of the war, he was an aide to Secretary of War Edwin Stanton with the rank of major. The night before the Lincoln assassination, Michael O'Laughlen (a childhood friend of John Wilkes Booth) showed up at the Stanton residence and made somewhat drunken inquiries that were handled by Kilburn. Kilburn's testimony was the strongest link connecting O'Laughlen to the Booth conspiracy, and helped secure a conviction.

Legal offices
| Preceded by Thomas E. Franklin | Attorney General of Pennsylvania; 1858–1861 | Succeeded by Samuel A. Purviance |
