= John C. Bell (lawyer) =

American lawyer

John Cromwell Bell
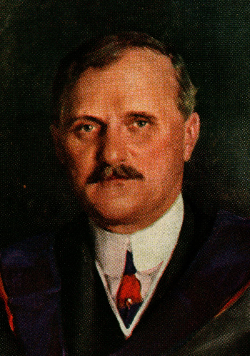
- From a portrait by Julian Story, c. 1918

District Attorney of Philadelphia
- In office 1903–1907
- Preceded by: John Weaver
- Succeeded by: Samuel P. Rotan

45th Attorney General of Pennsylvania
- In office January 17, 1911 – January 19, 1915
- Governor: John K. Tener
- Preceded by: Moses Hampton Todd
- Succeeded by: Francis Shunk Brown

Personal details
- Born: October 3, 1861 (Note: Some sources, including the New York Times obituary and the University of Pennsylvania, state or imply 1861. His "official" state biography in The Pennsylvania Manual while he was state Attorney General gives 1862.) Elders Ridge, West Lebanon, Pennsylvania
- Died: December 29, 1935 (aged 74) Philadelphia, Pennsylvania
- Spouse: Fleurette de Benneville Keim Myers (m. 1890; died 1916)
- Children: John C. Bell Jr.; De Benneville "Bert" Bell
- Education: University of Philadelphia

John Cromwell Bell (October 3, 1861 – December 29, 1935) was a distinguished Pennsylvania lawyer, serving as a District Attorney for Philadelphia and state Attorney General.

He was closely involved with football and his alma mater, the University of Pennsylvania. He served as director of Penn's athletic program, chairman of its football committee, and from 1911 onwards, was a trustee. He helped found the NCAA, and served on Intercollegiate Football Rules Committee, responsible for the many rules changes made in collegiate football in its early years.

== Personal life ==
His family moved to Philadelphia when he was fourteen. Bell attended Central High, graduating in 1880 (with an A.B.) and then the University of Pennsylvania Law School, receiving an LL.B. in 1884. At Penn, he played halfback on the football team for three years.

He married Fleurette de Benneville Keim Myers, daughter of Leonard Myers, a former Congressman, in 1890. They had two sons. The elder, John Cromwell, had a distinguished career as attorney, governor, and judge. The younger, de Benneville, known as Bert, had a distinguished career as football team owner and NFL commissioner. Fleurette died in 1916.

== Career ==
Bell achieved prominence as an attorney very quickly, and he was noted for his corporate work. He was offered a judgeship, but declined.

When in 1902 sitting Philadelphia District Attorney John Weaver won election as the city's mayor, Bell accepted the appointment to take his place, and then ran for and won a term on his own, but declined a renomination. As District Attorney, he was noted for enforcement of food purity laws. He gave the annual address before the Law Academy of Philadelphia: The Several Modes of Instituting Criminal Proceedings in Pennsylvania. An Address...before the Law Academy of Philadelphia, May 27, 1904. (Philadelphia, Dukes, 1904) that gave a useful detailed discussion of how a person might be indicted for criminal proceedings in early twentieth-century Philadelphia.

In 1911, Governor John K. Tener appointed Bell as state Attorney General. Upon completing his term, Bell returned to private practice.

Bell died of heart disease at his home in Philadelphia on December 29, 1935.

== Sources ==
- Charles Franklin Warwick (1913). Warwick's Keystone Commonwealth. Philadelphia, Pa. pp. 397–8. "john c bell."
- Smull, John Augustus; Smull, William P.; Cochran, Thomas Baumgardner; Harry Baker, W. (1913). Smull's Legislative Hand Book and Manual of the State of Pennsylvania. p. 182g.
- Samuel Hudson (1909). Pennsylvania and its public men. p. 81. "John C. Bell."
- Thomas Lynch Montgomery, ed. (1918). Pennsylvania and its University and other Addresses of John Cromwell Bell.
- General Alumni Catalogue of the University of Pennsylvania. 1922. p. 435.
- "John C. Bell dead, was leader of Bar". The New York Times. December 30, 1935. p. 19.

Legal offices
Preceded by Moses Hampton Todd	Pennsylvania Attorney General; 1911–1915	Succeeded by Francis Shunk Brown
