= Samuel Anderson Purviance =

American politician (1809–1882)

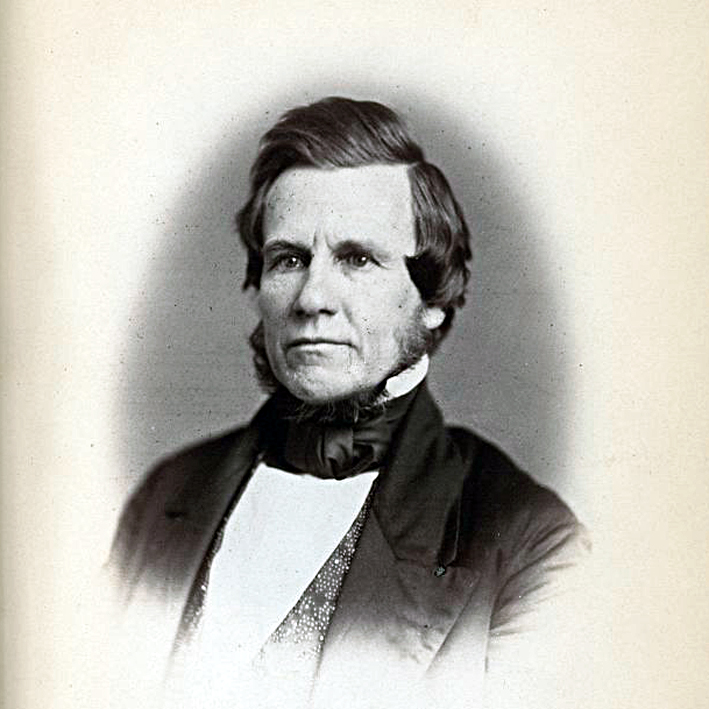

Samuel Anderson Purviance (January 10, 1809 – February 14, 1882) was a Whig and Republican politician and a member of the U.S. House of Representatives from Pennsylvania.

Samuel Anderson Purviance was born in Butler, Pennsylvania. He entered college and pursued a partial course and then studied law. He was admitted to the bar in 1827 and commenced practice in Butler. He moved to Warren County, Pennsylvania, and was prosecuting attorney for two years. He returned to Butler, where he continued the practice of law. He was a delegate to the state constitutional convention of 1837 and 1838. He was a member of the Pennsylvania House of Representatives in 1838 and 1839. He was a delegate to the 1844 Whig National Convention and to the Republican National Convention in 1856, 1860, 1864, and 1868.

Purviance was elected as a Whig Party candidate to the Thirty-fourth Congress, and reelected as a Republican to the Thirty-fifth Congress. He was an unsuccessful candidate for renomination in 1858.

He moved to Pittsburgh in 1859 and continued the practice of law. He served as attorney general of Pennsylvania in 1861. He resumed the practice of law in Pittsburgh until 1876, when he retired. He served as a member of the National Executive Committee of the Republican Party from 1864 to 1868. He was a member of the state constitutional convention of 1872. He was an unsuccessful candidate for election in 1874. He died in Allegheny, Pennsylvania (now a part of Pittsburgh). Interment in Highwood (formerly Bellevue) Cemetery.

== Sources ==
- United States Congress. "Samuel Anderson Purviance (id: P000576)". Biographical Directory of the United States Congress.
- The Political Graveyard

U.S. House of Representatives
Preceded by Thomas M. Howe	Member of the U.S. House of Representatives from Pennsylvania's 22nd congressional district 1855-1859	Succeeded by Robert McKnight
Legal offices
Preceded by John C. Knox	Attorney General of Pennsylvania; 1861	Succeeded by William M. Meredith
