= Frederick Smith (Pennsylvania lawyer) =

American lawyer

Attorney General of Pennsylvania
- In office December 18, 1823 – February 5, 1828
- Governor: John Andrew Shulze
- Preceded by: Thomas Elder
- Succeeded by: Calvin Blythe

Personal details
- Born: March 1, 1773 Germantown, Philadelphia, US
- Died: October 6, 1830 (aged 57) Reading, Pennsylvania, US
- Spouse: Catharine Leaf
- Relatives: Edmond L. Smith (grandson)
- Education: University of Pennsylvania
- Profession: Attorney, Judge

Frederick Smith (March 1, 1773 – October 6, 1830) was a Pennsylvania lawyer. He was state Attorney General (1823–8) and a justice of the state's Supreme Court (1828–30).

== Biography and career ==
Smith was born in the Germantown area of Philadelphia. After graduating in 1792 from the University of Pennsylvania, he worked and studied in the office of Jared Ingersoll, a signer of the U. S. Constitution who was then the newly appointed state Attorney General. In 1794, Smith moved to Reading, and practiced law in Berks, Lehigh, Northampton, and Schuylkill counties.

In 1809 he was part of the team defending, unsuccessfully, the controversial Susanna Cox.

In 1823, Governor Shulze offered Smith the position of Secretary of the Commonwealth, which he declined, but then offered Smith the position of state Attorney General, which he accepted. He served until 1828, when he resigned upon being appointed to the state Supreme Court, where he served until his death in 1830.

His grandson Edmond L. Smith was a member of the Pennsylvania House of Representatives and the Colorado Territorial Legislative Assembly.

Legal offices
Preceded by Thomas Elder	Attorney General of Pennsylvania; 1823–1828	Succeeded by Calvin Blythe
