= Moses Hampton =

American politician

Member of the U.S. House of Representatives from Pennsylvania's 21st district
- In office March 4, 1847 – March 3, 1851
- Preceded by: Cornelius Darragh
- Succeeded by: Thomas Marshall Howe

Personal details
- Born: October 28, 1803 Beaver, Pennsylvania
- Died: June 27, 1878 (aged 74) Wilkinsburg, Pennsylvania
- Party: Whig
- Education: Washington College

Moses Hampton (October 28, 1803 – June 27, 1878) was a Whig member of the U.S. House of Representatives from Pennsylvania.

== Biography ==
Moses Hampton was born in Beaver, Pennsylvania. He moved with his parents to Trumbull County, Ohio. He pursued classical studies and graduated from Washington College (now known as Washington and Jefferson College) in Washington, Pennsylvania, in 1827. He studied law in Uniontown, Pennsylvania, was admitted to the bar in 1829 and commenced practice in Somerset, Pennsylvania. He moved to Pittsburgh, Pennsylvania, in 1838 and continued the practice of law, founding the law firm which would ultimately become Buchanan, Ingersoll & Rooney.

Hampton was elected as a Whig to the Thirtieth and Thirty-first Congresses. He was not a candidate for renomination in 1850. He served as president judge of the Allegheny County, District Court from 1853 to 1879. He died at his home, "Hampton Place," adjoining the village of Wilkinsburg, Pennsylvania. Interment in Allegheny Cemetery.

He is the namesake of Hampton Township, Allegheny County, Pennsylvania.

== Sources ==
- United States Congress. "Moses Hampton (id: H000139)". Biographical Directory of the United States Congress.
- The Political Graveyard

== Notes ==
U.S. House of Representatives
Preceded by Cornelius Darragh	Member of the U.S. House of Representatives from Pennsylvania's 21st congressional district 1847 - 1851	Succeeded by Thomas M. Howe
