= William Lewis Dewart =

American politician

William L. Dewart
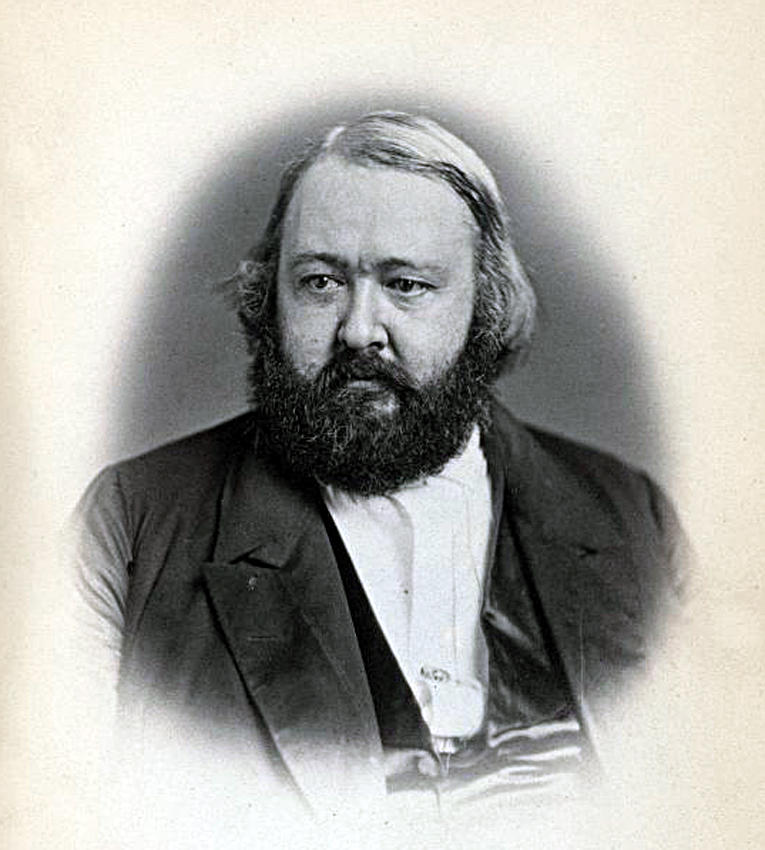
- William Dewart

Member of the U.S. House of Representatives from Pennsylvania's 11th district
- In office March 4, 1857 – March 3, 1859
- Preceded by: James H. Campbell
- Succeeded by: James H. Campbell

Personal details
- Born: June 21, 1821 Sunbury, Pennsylvania, U.S.
- Died: April 19, 1888 (aged 66) Sunbury, Pennsylvania, U.S.
- Party: Democratic

William Lewis Dewart (June 21, 1821 – April 19, 1888) was a Democratic member of the U.S. House of Representatives from Pennsylvania.

== Biography ==
William L. Dewart (son of Lewis Dewart) was born in Sunbury, Pennsylvania. He attended the common schools of Sunbury and Harrisburg, Pennsylvania. He was graduated from Dickinson Preparatory School in Carlisle, Pennsylvania, and from Princeton College in 1839. He studied law, was admitted to the Northumberland County, Pennsylvania, bar in 1843, and commenced practice in Sunbury. He served as chief burgess of Sunbury in 1845 and 1846, and as president of the school board. He was a delegate to the Democratic National Conventions in 1852, 1856, 1860, and 1884. He was an unsuccessful candidate for election in 1854.

Dewart was elected as a Democrat to the Thirty-fifth Congress. He served as chairman of the United States House Committee on Revisal and Unfinished Business. He was an unsuccessful candidate for reelection in 1858. He resumed the practice of law in Sunbury and died there in 1888. Interment in the family vault in Sunbury Cemetery.

His granddaughter Betty Brice (born Rosetta Dewart Brice, 1888–1935) was an actress in silent films.

== Sources ==
- United States Congress. "William Lewis Dewart (id: D000290)". Biographical Directory of the United States Congress.
- The Political Graveyard

U.S. House of Representatives
Preceded by James H. Campbell	Member of the U.S. House of Representatives from Pennsylvania's 11th congressional district 1857 - 1859	Succeeded by James H. Campbell
