= Joseph Reed (lawyer) =

American lawyer (1772–1846)

Pennsylvania Attorney General
- In office October 2, 1810 – January 26, 1811
- Governor: Simon Snyder
- Preceded by: Walter Franklin
- Succeeded by: Richard Rush

Personal details
- Born: July 11, 1772 Philadelphia, Pennsylvania
- Died: March 4, 1846 (aged 73) Philadelphia, Pennsylvania
- Spouse: Maria Ellis Watmough
- Children: 4

Joseph Reed (July 11, 1772 – March 4, 1846) was a Pennsylvania lawyer and legal writer, who served briefly as the state Attorney General.

== Biography and career ==
Reed was born the son of Pennsylvania lawyer Joseph Reed and Esther de Berdt. Shortly after Reed's birth, the elder Reed gave up his law practice and became closely involved with George Washington and the American Revolutionary War, served a term as Pennsylvania's president, and was a delegate to the first Continental Congress. He died a few years after the war ended. Reed was then raised in the home of Jared Ingersoll. He graduated from the College of New Jersey in 1792 and was admitted to the bar the same year.

In 1805, he married Maria Ellis Watmough (or Watmaugh), they had four children. Two sons, Henry Hope and William Bradford would become lawyers. Henry would switch careers and become a distinguished academic in literature. William Bradford would, like his father, serve as state Attorney General, and then also switch careers. He was later appointed U.S. Envoy to China, and became an academic in history, writing books on his paternal grandparents.

Reed served as prothonotary of the Supreme Court of Pennsylvania from 1801–1810. When Walter Franklin resigned in 1810 as state Attorney-General near the end of his term, Reed was appointed to complete the term. Reed was Recorder of the city of Philadelphia, 1810–1829. In 1816, Reed was elected as a member of the American Philosophical Society.

== Publications ==
- The Laws of Pennsylvania, 5 volumes, 1822–4.

Legal offices
Preceded by Walter Franklin	Pennsylvania Attorney General; 1810–1811	Succeeded by Richard Rush
