= Jonathan Dickinson Sergeant =

American politician (1746-1793)

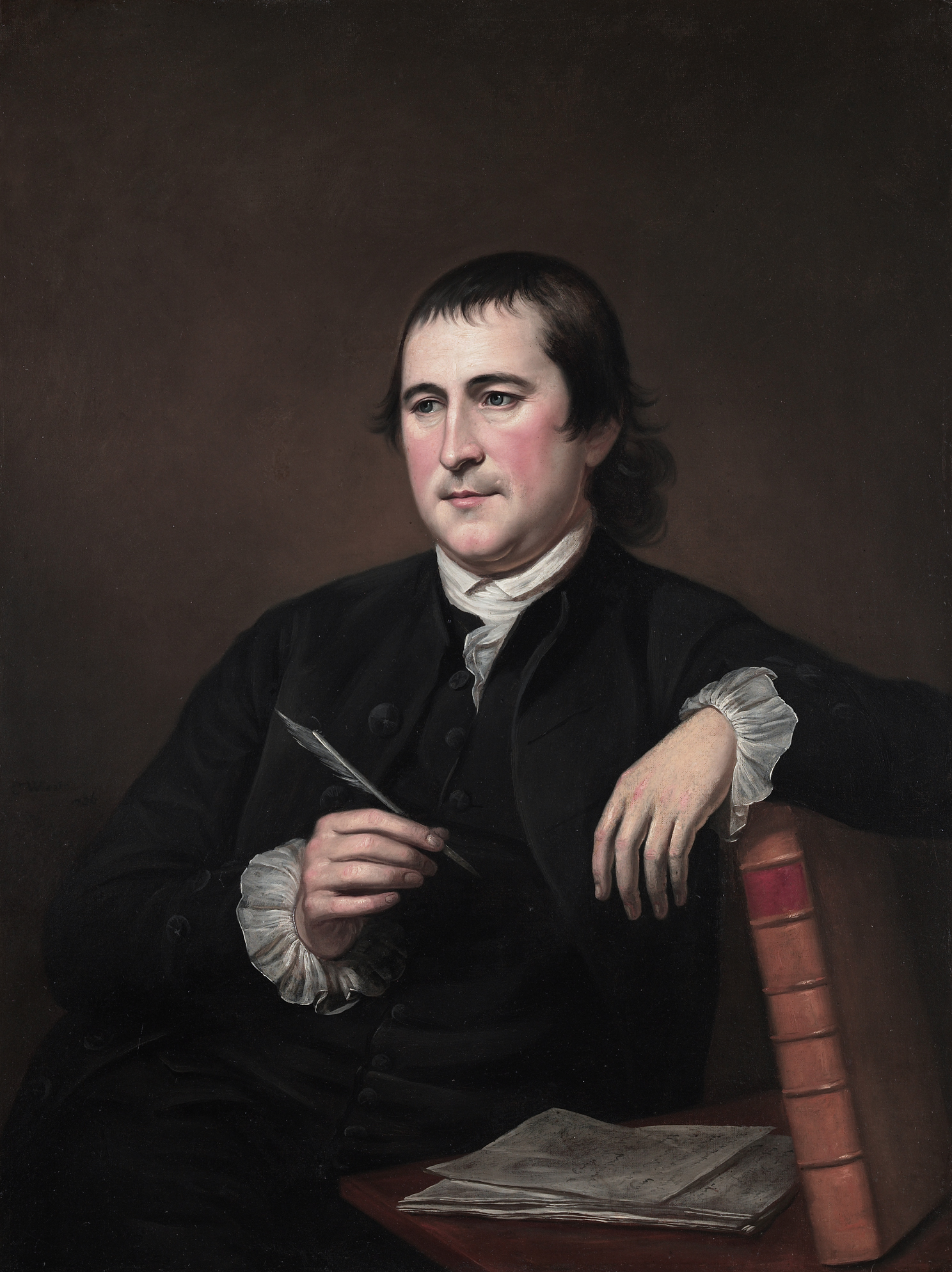
- Portrait of Jonathan Dickinson Sergeant by Charles Willson Peale (1786)

Attorney General of Pennsylvania
- In office 1777–1780
- Preceded by: John Morris, Jr.
- Succeeded by: William Bradford

Personal details
- Born: 1746 Newark, Province of New Jersey, British America
- Died: October 8, 1793 (aged 46–47) Philadelphia, Pennsylvania, U.S.
- Resting place: Laurel Hill Cemetery, Philadelphia, Pennsylvania, U.S.
- Spouse(s): Margaret Spencer; Elizabeth Rittenhouse
- Children: 8
- Relatives: Jonathan Dickinson (maternal grandfather); John Sergeant (son); Thomas Sergeant (son)
- Education: College of New Jersey; College of Philadelphia

Jonathan Dickinson Sergeant (1746 – October 8, 1793) was an American politician who served as a member of the Provincial Congress of New Jersey from 1774 to 1776. He was a member of the committee that drafted the Constitution of New Jersey. He served as a delegate from the Province of New Jersey to the Second Continental Congress in 1776 and 1777, and as Pennsylvania Attorney General from 1777 to 1780.

== Early life and education ==
Sergeant was born in 1746 in Newark, New Jersey, to Abigail (Dickinson) and Jonathan Sergeant. He moved with his parents to Princeton. He completed his initial studies, attended the College of New Jersey (now Princeton University), and received his degree in 1762. His maternal grandfather, Jonathan Dickinson, was the first president of the college at its founding in 1747. He graduated from the College of Philadelphia (now the University of Pennsylvania) in 1763 with an A.B. degree. He studied law in the Princeton office of Richard Stockton, was accepted into the New Jersey bar, and entered practice in Princeton in 1767.

== Career ==
He was a member of the Sons of Liberty and served a major role in the Stamp Act controversy.

From 1774 to 1776 he was a member of the revolutionary New Jersey Provincial Congress. He served as clerk to the Provincial convention in New Brunswick on July 21, 1774, and as a delegate and secretary to the convention held in Trenton on May 23, 1775. He was a member and treasurer to the New Jersey Committee of Safety.

In early 1776, he was a delegate to the Continental Congress, but resigned in June to return home and serve on the committee that drafted the Constitution of New Jersey. On August 13, 1776, Sergeant wrote to John Adams of his plan to recruit a battalion of black slaves to help fight the British. Adams wrote back to Sergeant, "Your Negro battalion will never do. S. Carolina would run out of their wits at the least hint of such a measure."

In November 1776, he returned again to the national congress. In December 1776, Sergeant moved to Philadelphia after Hessian troops burned his house in Princeton. In September 1777 he resigned from Congress a second time, this time to accept office as the attorney general of Pennsylvania. He served as attorney general until his resignation on November 20, 1780. He moved to Philadelphia and opened a law practice there in 1780. He participated in the trial to settle the Pennamite–Yankee War land dispute between Pennsylvania and Connecticut.

In 1784, he was elected a member of the American Philosophical Society.

He served on the Committee of Health in Philadelphia during the yellow fever epidemic of 1792 and 1793. He was a candidate in the 1792 U.S. House election for Pennsylvania's 13 at-large seats, where the top 13 would be elected; he finished 15th. Sergeant died in Philadelphia in 1793 during the local yellow fever epidemic. He was initially interred in the Old Pine Street Church cemetery, but was re-interred to Laurel Hill Cemetery in 1878.

== Personal life ==
In 1775, he married Margaret Spencer and together they had eight children. Margaret died in 1787 and he re-married Elizabeth Rittenhouse, the daughter of David Rittenhouse, in 1778.

His son John Sergeant later represented Pennsylvania in the U.S. Congress. Another son, Thomas Sergeant, served as Pennsylvania secretary of state, attorney general and on the state Supreme Court.

Legal offices
Preceded by John Morris, Jr.	Pennsylvania Attorney General; 1777–1780	Succeeded by William Bradford
