= Daniel Sheffer =

American politician (1783–1880)

Member of the U.S. House of Representatives from Pennsylvania's 12th district
- In office March 4, 1837 – March 3, 1839
- Preceded by: George Chambers
- Succeeded by: James Cooper

Personal details
- Born: May 24, 1783 York, Pennsylvania
- Died: February 16, 1880 (aged 96) York Springs, Pennsylvania, U.S.
- Resting place: Old Lutheran Cemetery, York Springs, Pennsylvania, U.S.
- Party: Democratic
- Children: 2
- Parent(s): Henry Sheffer; Anna Maria Billmeyer
- Education: Harvard University
- Profession: Politician, physician, judge

Daniel Sheffer (May 24, 1783 – February 16, 1880) was an American politician, medical doctor, and judge who served a single term in the United States House of Representatives, representing the 12th congressional district of Pennsylvania from 1837 to 1839 as a Democrat in the 25th United States Congress.

== Early life and education ==
Sheffer was born in York, Pennsylvania on May 24, 1783, to Henry Sheffer and Anna Maria Billmeyer. He attended common schools and Harvard University.

Sheffer studied medicine in Philadelphia and commenced practice in York Springs, Pennsylvania.

== Career ==
Sheffer served as associate judge of Adams County, Pennsylvania from 1813 to 1837.

Sheffer was elected as a Democrat to the 25th United States Congress. He served from March 4, 1837, to March 3, 1839, representing the 12th congressional district of Pennsylvania. Sheffer was an unsuccessful candidate for re-election in 1838 to the 26th United States Congress.

Following his tenure in Congress, Sheffer resumed the practice of his profession. He was a delegate to the 1848 Democratic National Convention.

== Personal life and death ==
Sheffer had two children.

Sheffer died at the age of 96 in York Springs, Pennsylvania on February 16, 1880. He was interred in the Old Lutheran Cemetery, located in York Springs.

== See also ==
- List of United States representatives who served a single term

U.S. House of Representatives
Preceded by George Chambers	Member of the U.S. House of Representatives from Pennsylvania's 12th congressional district 1837–1839	Succeeded by James Cooper
