= Hampton L. Carson (lawyer) =

American lawyer (1852–1929)

Hampton Lawrence Carson

Attorney General of Pennsylvania
- In office January 21, 1903 – January 16, 1907
- Governor: Samuel W. Pennypacker
- Preceded by: John P. Elkin
- Succeeded by: Moses Hampton Todd

Personal details
- Born: February 21, 1852 Philadelphia, Pennsylvania, U.S.
- Died: July 18, 1929 (aged 77) Bryn Mawr, Pennsylvania, U.S.
- Resting place: Laurel Hill Cemetery, Philadelphia, Pennsylvania, U.S.
- Spouse: Anna Lea Baker
- Children: 4
- Education: University of Pennsylvania

Hampton Lawrence Carson (February 21, 1852 – July 18, 1929) was an American attorney. An influential Pennsylvania lawyer, he was also a legal scholar and historian. In addition to his private practice, he served as professor of law at the University of Pennsylvania, state Attorney General, president of the American Bar Association, and president of the Historical Society of Pennsylvania.

Carson argued numerous cases before the Supreme Courts of Pennsylvania and the United States. Noted cases included arguing (unsuccessfully) Lone Wolf v. Hitchcock and offering for probate the William Weightman will.

Carson was also noted for his extensive collection of legal papers, books, documents, and portraits.

== Biography ==
Carson was born on February 21, 1852, in Philadelphia to Dr. Joseph Carson and Mary Hollingsworth. His father was a professor in medicine at the University of Pennsylvania, whose grandfather had emigrated to Philadelphia in the 1740s. Carson's mother, born Mary Hollingsworth, was a descendant of Henry Hollingsworth, deputy surveyor for William Penn.

Carson was graduated from the University of Pennsylvania in 1871, and its law school in 1874. He taught at the University of Pennsylvania from 1895 to 1903 and then entered private practice. He was a partner in several firms and specialized in estate law. He edited the Legal Gazette. He was a professor with the Penn Law School, 1895–1901. He was appointed state attorney general in 1903 by Governor Samuel Pennypacker and served until 1907.

He served as president of the American Bar Association from 1919 to 1921 and as chairman of the sub-committee of the Pennsylvania Commission on Constitutional Amendment and Revision. He served as president of the Historical Society of Pennsylvania from 1921 until his death in 1929.

== Personal life ==
Carson married Anna Lee Baker in 1880 and together they had 5 children. One son, Joseph, became a lawyer and practiced law with his father. He was elected as a member to the American Philosophical Society in that same year.

He is buried in Section J, Lot 217 at Laurel Hill Cemetery in Philadelphia.

== Bibliography ==
- The Law of Criminal Conspiracies and Agreements, as found in the American cases. Philadelphia: Blackstone Publishing Company. 1887.
- The History of the Supreme Court of the United States. Philadelphia: P. W. Ziegler and Company. 1902.

Legal offices
Preceded by John P. Elkin	Pennsylvania Attorney General; 1903–1907	Succeeded by Moses Hampton Todd
