= Walter Franklin (judge) =

American judge

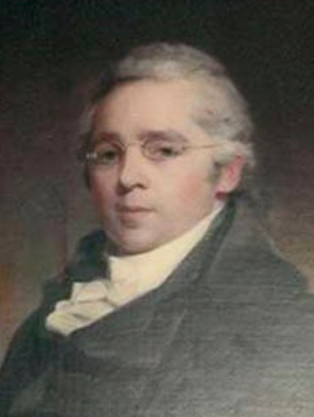
- Portrait, 1810, by Thomas Sully

5th Attorney General of Pennsylvania
- In office January 9, 1809 – October 2, 1810
- Governor: Simon Snyder
- Preceded by: Mahlon Dickerson
- Succeeded by: Joseph Reed

Personal details
- Born: May 17, 1773 New York City
- Died: February 7, 1836 (aged 62) Lancaster County, Pennsylvania
- Spouse: Anne Emlen
- Children: 5, including Thomas and Emlen
- Profession: Attorney, Judge

Walter Franklin (May 17, 1773 – February 7, 1836) was a Pennsylvania lawyer, state Attorney General, and state judge.

== Biography and career ==
Franklin was born in New York, in 1773, the son of Thomas Franklin, a prosperous merchant. The family moved to Philadelphia in 1775, and during the War, Thomas was appointed commissary of prisoners.

Franklin was admitted to the bar in Philadelphia county in 1792, age 19.

He married Anne Emlen in 1802. Five of their children survived to adulthood.

He was appointed state Attorney General in 1809, and served until 1810, when Judge John Joseph Henry retired as president judge of the Second Judicial District, then consisting of York, Lancaster and Dauphin counties, and Franklin was appointed to take his place. (Since 1833, the District consisting of just Lancaster county.)

Franklin was impeached twice by the state House of Representatives, in 1818 and in 1825, for alleged judicial misconduct, but the Senate acquitted him both times.

Two of his sons, and three of his grandsons, would become members of the Lancaster bar. Of the sons, Thomas E. Franklin would eventually serve two terms as state Attorney General.

Franklin died in office.

Legal offices
Preceded by Mahlon Dickerson	Pennsylvania Attorney General; 1809–1810	Succeeded by Joseph Reed
