= Edmond L. Smith =

American politician (1829–1891)

Member of the Colorado Territorial Legislature
- In office 1875–1875

Member of the Pennsylvania House of Representatives from the Berks County district
- In office 1858–1859

Personal details
- Born: Edmond Leaf Smith; October 23, 1829
- Died: September 11, 1891 (aged 61) Reading, Pennsylvania, U.S.
- Resting place: Saint Peter the Apostle Church Cemetery; Reading, Pennsylvania, U.S.
- Party: Democratic
- Relatives: Frederick Smith (grandfather)
- Education: Georgetown University
- Occupation: Politician; lawyer
- Military career
- Branch: Union Army
- Service years: 1861–1867
- Rank: Major (brevet)
- Units: 25th Pennsylvania Infantry Regiment; 55th Pennsylvania Infantry Regiment
- Conflicts: American Civil War; Battle of South Mountain; Peninsula campaign; Battle of Antietam; Battle of Fredericksburg; Battle of Chickamauga (POW)

Edmond Leaf Smith (October 23, 1829 – September 11, 1891) was an American politician and lawyer from Pennsylvania and Colorado. He served in the Pennsylvania House of Representatives, representing Berks County from 1858 to 1859. He also served in the Colorado Territorial Legislative Assembly in 1875.

== Early life ==
Edmond Leaf Smith was born on October 23, 1829, to Margaret (née Bright) and George L. Smith. His father was a mill worker and Democratic politician. His grandfather Frederick Smith was Pennsylvania Attorney General and associate judge of the Pennsylvania Supreme Court. Smith graduated from the Reading Academy. He graduated from Georgetown University in 1849. He studied law under Henry W. Smith and Edward P. Pearson. He was admitted to the bar of Berks County on November 11, 1851.

== Career ==
Smith was a Democrat. He served in the Pennsylvania House of Representatives, representing Berks County from 1858 to 1859.

In 1861, Smith enlisted as a private with the Ringgold artillery. He transferred to the regular army as a captain on May 14, 1861. He reached the rank of first lieutenant of Company C of the 25th Pennsylvania Infantry Regiment. He commanded during the Battle of South Mountain, the Peninsula campaign, Battle of Antietam and at the Battle of Fredericksburg. In 1863, he served as corporal of Company H of the 55th Pennsylvania Infantry Regiment. He was captured during the Battle of Chickamauga and was imprisoned at Libby Prison from 1863 to 1864. He escaped via tunnel and was captured twice more. He was then held captive in Charleston, South Carolina. He was paroled and exchanged in October 1864 with the help of his former Georgetown schoolmate Confederate Major Edmund Deslonde. He received a major's brevet for "bravery and meritorious conduct" during the Battle of Chickamauga. He served until the end of the Civil War and resigned his commission in 1867.

After his military service, Smith worked with his brother J. Bright Smith in a law practice in Denver, Colorado. He served in the Colorado Territorial Legislative Assembly in 1875. After his brother retired, Smith practiced law with Judge Ebenezer T. Wells and Thomas Mason in the firm Wells, Smith & Mason. He worked as a lawyer until 1891.

== Personal life ==
Smith lived at 519 Walnut Street in Reading.

Smith died on September 11, 1891, at his home in Reading, Pennsylvania. He was interred at Saint Peter the Apostle Church Cemetery in Reading.
