= Thomas E. Franklin (lawyer) =

American lawyer (1810–1884)

26th Attorney General of Pennsylvania
- In office April 28, 1851 – January 21, 1852
- Governor: William F. Johnston
- Preceded by: Cornelius Darragh
- Succeeded by: James Campbell

29th Attorney General of Pennsylvania
- In office January 17, 1855 – January 19, 1858
- Governor: James Pollock
- Preceded by: Francis Wade Hughes
- Succeeded by: John C. Knox

Personal details
- Born: April 20, 1810 Philadelphia, US
- Died: November 28, 1884 (aged 74) Lancaster, Pennsylvania, US
- Spouse: Serena A. Mayer
- Children: 11
- Parent: Walter Franklin (father)
- Relatives: Emlen Franklin (brother)
- Education: Yale College
- Profession: Attorney

Thomas Emlen Franklin (April 20, 1810 – November 28, 1884) was an American lawyer from Pennsylvania who served two terms as state attorney general.

== Personal life and career ==
Franklin was born in Philadelphia, the son of Walter Franklin and Anne Emlen. His father at the time was serving as state attorney general, and upon his father's appointment to a judgeship in 1811, the family moved to Lancaster. His brother was Emlen Franklin.

Franklin graduated from Yale College in 1828 and was admitted to the bar in 1831, opening an office in Lancaster, where he resided for the rest of his life.

In 1837, he married Serena A. Mayer. They had 11 children. Two sons became lawyers, and two daughters married lawyers.

Franklin was twice appointed attorney general for the state. He was a delegate to U. S. presidential nomination conventions three times (1844, Henry Clay; 1848, Zachary Taylor; 1864, Abraham Lincoln). He declined all offers to be further involved in politics.

In local business, he was a founding director for the Lancaster, Portsmouth, and Harrisburg Railroad Company (later part of the Pennsylvania Railroad Company), a director of the Farmers' National Bank, and president of the Lancaster Fire Insurance Company.

Franklin was active in Episcopalian Church affairs, and in his later years served as chancellor of the diocese for central Pennsylvania.

Legal offices
Preceded by Cornelius Darragh	Attorney General of Pennsylvania; 1851–1852	Succeeded by James Campbell
Preceded by Francis Wade Hughes	Attorney General of Pennsylvania; 1855–1858	Succeeded by John C. Knox
