= Ellis Lewis =

American judge

Chief Justice of the Supreme Court of Pennsylvania
- In office December 4, 1854 – December 7, 1857 (Note: The exact dates of his term were subject to dispute at the time, due to ambiguities in the new succession process. See Konkle (1907, pp. 195–201, 218–22).)
- Preceded by: Jeremiah S. Black
- Succeeded by: Walter H. Lowrie

Associate Justice of the Supreme Court of Pennsylvania
- In office November 17, 1851 – December 4, 1854

Attorney General of Pennsylvania
- In office January 29, 1833 – October 14, 1833
- Governor: George Wolf
- Preceded by: Samuel Douglas
- Succeeded by: George M. Dallas

Personal details
- Born: May 16, 1798 Lewisberry, York County, Pennsylvania
- Died: March 19, 1871 (aged 72) Philadelphia, Pennsylvania
- Spouse: Josephine Wallis
- Occupation: Judge, lawyer

Ellis Lewis (May 16, 1798 – March 19, 1871) was a Pennsylvania lawyer and judge. He served on the state's Supreme Court for six years, the last three as chief justice.

== Life and career ==
Ellis Lewis was the youngest child of Major Eli and Pamela Lewis. Orphaned at the age of nine, he was apprenticed as a printer to the owner of the Harrisburg newspaper founded by his father. After five years, he ran away and found work as a printer under an assumed name. By 1818, he owned a newspaper in Williamsport, Lycoming County. There he studied law with Espy Van Horne. He sold the newspaper in 1821, and was admitted to the bar in 1822. He continued to work with his brothers Eli and James and their newspapers, by which means he began his involvement in Pennsylvania politics.

Lewis married Josephine Wallis in 1822. Their oldest child, Juliet would become a poet and novelist, and marry James Hepburn Campbell, a lawyer and politician.

In 1823, Lewis supported John Andrew Shulze's election as Governor of Pennsylvania, and was appointed in 1824 Deputy Attorney General (Note: A position now called District Attorney) for Lycoming and Tioga Counties. That year a painful condition developed in his leg, and as of 1827, he was reappointed for Lycoming County only. In 1827, surgery removed a necrosis from his tibia. (Note: One of the surgeons was his brother Webster.) While recovering, he resigned his position. and moved to Towanda, Bradford County.

In 1832, Lewis was elected to the Pennsylvania House, as an Independent. Early in 1833, he was appointed state Attorney General, without giving up his House seat. He resigned both positions when, late in 1833, he was appointed President Judge of the Eighth Judicial District. In 1843 he was appointed President Judge of the Second Judicial District.

In 1850, Pennsylvania amended its constitution to choose its Supreme Court members by election. Lewis was elected in 1851, and became chief justice in 1854. At the end of his term in 1857, he declined to run for re-election and retired, making his home in Philadelphia. He took up poetry (like his father and daughter) and also wrote on law. He died in 1871, and was buried at The Woodlands.

== Notes ==
Legal offices
Preceded by Samuel Douglas	Attorney General of Pennsylvania; 1833	Succeeded by George M. Dallas
Preceded by Jeremiah S. Black	Chief Justice of the Pennsylvania Supreme Court; 1829–1831	Succeeded by Walter H. Lowrie
