= Blythe Township, Pennsylvania =

Township in Pennsylvania, US

Coordinates: 40°44′00″N 76°07′59″W

- Township
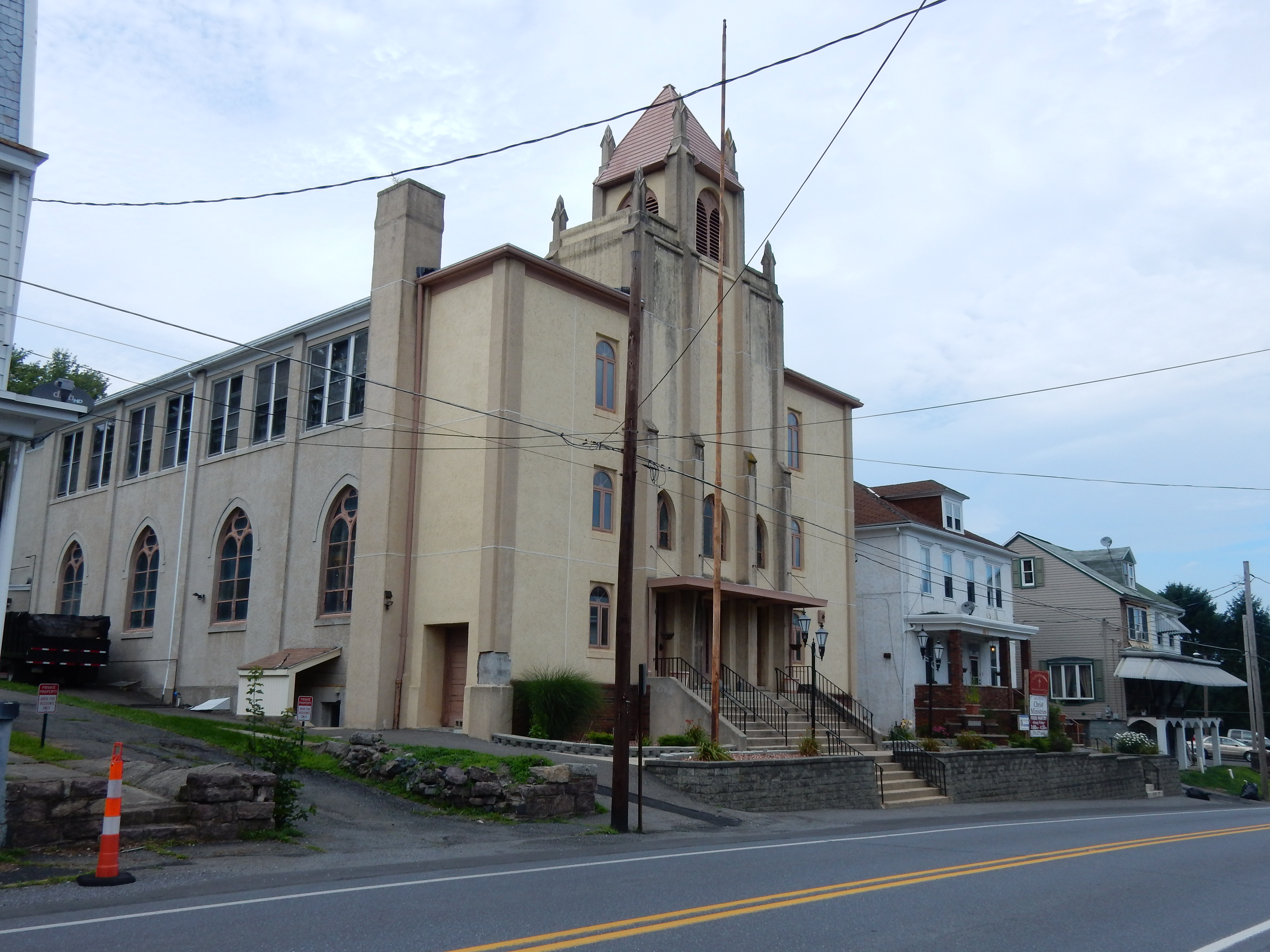
- Market Street (U.S. Route 209) in Cumbola.

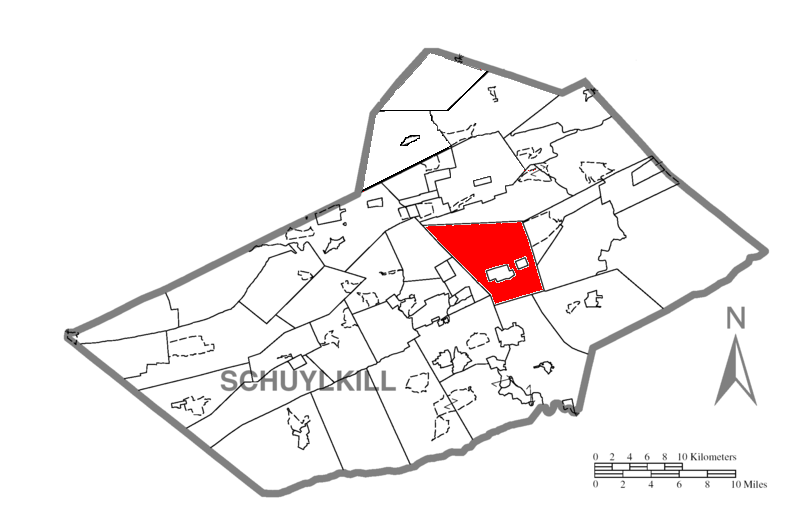
- Map of Schuylkill County, Pennsylvania Highlighting Blythe Township

- Map of Schuylkill County, Pennsylvania
- Country: United States
- State: Pennsylvania
- County: Schuylkill
- Settled: 1805
- Incorporated: 1846

Area
  - Total: 27.78 sq mi (71.94 km^{2})
  - Land: 27.59 sq mi (71.45 km^{2})
  - Water: 0.19 sq mi (0.48 km^{2})

Population (2020)
  - Total: 811 ▼
  - Estimate (2023): 816
  - Density: 33/sq mi (12.6/km^{2})
- Time zone: UTC-5 (Eastern (EST))
  - Summer (DST): UTC-4 (EDT)
- FIPS code: 42-107-07336

Blythe Township is a township in Schuylkill County, Pennsylvania. Formed in 1846 from part of Schuylkill Township, it is named for State Legislator Calvin Blythe.

== Geography ==
According to the U.S. Census Bureau, the township has a total area of 27.7 square miles (72 km^{2}), of which 27.5 square miles (71 km^{2}) is land and 0.2 square miles (0.52 km^{2}) (0.69%) is water. It contains the census-designated place of Cumbola.

== Demographics ==
Historical population
Census	Pop.	Note	%±
2010	924		—
2020	811		−12.2%
2023 (est.)	816		0.6%
U.S. Decennial Census

At the 2000 census, there were 905 people, 386 households, and 250 families living in the township. The population density was 32.9 inhabitants per square mile (12.7/km^{2}). There were 421 housing units at an average density of 15.3/sq mi (5.9/km^{2}). The racial makeup of the township was 99.45% White, 0.33% Asian, and 0.22% from two or more races. Hispanic or Latino of any race were 0.33%.

Of the 386 households 21.5% had children under the age of 18 living with them, 50.5% were married couples living together, 9.3% had a female householder with no husband present, and 35.0% were non-families. 29.8% of households were one person and 14.8% were one person aged 65 or older. The average household size was 2.34 and the average family size was 2.91.

The age distribution was 18.0% under the age of 18, 7.1% from 18 to 24, 30.8% from 25 to 44, 24.2% from 45 to 64, and 19.9% 65 or older. The median age was 41 years. For every 100 females, there were 101.6 males. For every 100 females age 18 and over, there were 94.8 males.

The median household income was $34,044 and the median family income was $43,672. Males had a median income of $30,972 versus $22,386 for females. The per capita income for the township was $16,348. About 9.3% of families and 10.3% of the population were below the poverty line, including 14.5% of those under age 18 and 10.0% of those age 65 or over.
