= Thomas Marshall Howe =

American politician (1808–1877)

Thomas M. Howe
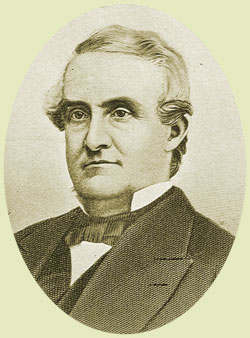

Member of the U.S. House of Representatives from Pennsylvania
- In office March 4, 1851 – March 3, 1855
- Preceded by: Moses Hampton
- Succeeded by: Samuel Anderson Purviance
- Constituency: 21st district (1851-1853); 22nd district (1853-1855)

Personal details
- Born: April 20, 1808 Williamstown, Vermont
- Died: July 20, 1877 (aged 69) Pittsburgh, Pennsylvania
- Party: Whig (until 1855); Republican (after 1855)

Thomas Marshall Howe (April 20, 1808 – July 20, 1877) was a Whig member of the U.S. House of Representatives from Pennsylvania. He was a financier, statesman, manufacturer, and philanthropist. He was considered the leading citizen of Pittsburgh of his day.

== Biography ==
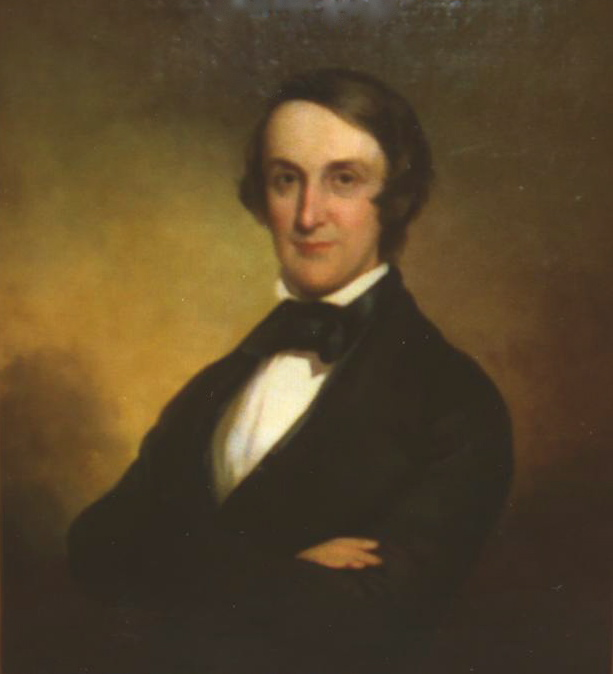
Thomas Marshall Howe

Howe (father-in-law of James W. Brown and George Wilkins Guthrie) was born in Williamstown, Vermont. He moved with his parents to Bloomfield, Ohio in 1817. He attended private schools and graduated from Warren Academy in Warren, Ohio. He moved to Pittsburgh, Pennsylvania in 1829, where he served as a clerk in a wholesale dry-goods establishment before commencing business for himself in 1833. He married Mary Ann Palmer Howe on December 13, 1833. From 1839 to 1859, Howe served as a cashier and president of the Exchange National Bank of Pittsburgh. He also engaged in copper mining, copper and steel manufacturing, commercial pursuits, and banking.

Howe was elected as a Whig to the Thirty-second and Thirty-third Congresses. He was not a candidate for renomination in 1854. He resumed his former business pursuits, and was a delegate to the 1860 Republican National Convention that nominated Abraham Lincoln as the candidate for president. He was assistant adjutant general on the staff of Governor Andrew Gregg Curtin and chairman of the Allegheny County committee for recruiting Union soldiers during the American Civil War. He was one of the organizers and first president of the Pittsburgh chamber of commerce. He died in Pittsburgh in 1877 and was interred in Allegheny Cemetery.

== Business activities ==
Mason and McDonough, Drygoods merchants, corner Third Avenue and Wood Street, Pittsburgh, 1829, Clerk.
S. Baird & Company, Drygoods merchants, corner Fifth Avenue and Wood Street, Pittsburgh, 1831, Salesman.
Wallace, Howe & Company, Hardware merchants, Wood Street, Pittsburgh, 1832, Partner.
Leavitt & Company, Hardware merchants, Wood Street, Pittsburgh, 1833, Partner.
Exchange National Bank, Pittsburgh, Cashier, 1839.
Exchange National Bank Pittsburgh, President 1851.
Pittsburgh & Boston Mining Company, Director and Treasurer for 25 years; original shareholder together with Dr. C. G. Hussey, Wm. Bagaley, Reverend Charles Avery, and James M. Cooper, operated highly successful Cliff Mine on Lake Superior, Michigan, 1840s – 1850s and other copper mining and copper products manufacturing enterprises.
C.G. Hussey & Co., Copper manufacturers, organizing shareholder together with Dr. C. G. Hussey and Reverend Charles Avery, 1840s – 1850s.
Hussey, Wells & Co., steelmakers, an organizing shareholder.
Hussey, Howe & Co., steelmakers.
Howe, Brown & Company, Ltd., steelmakers, President.
Cleveland & Pittsburgh Railroad, Director, Shareholder.
Penn Cotton Mills, Allegheny, PA., original proprietor.

== Civic interests ==
Allegheny Cemetery of Pittsburgh, Incorporator, President for thirty years.
Pittsburgh Chamber of Commerce, President from inception to his death.

== Political highlights ==
Whig Party of Pennsylvania, Western Pennsylvania leader, active in the Harrison-Tyler campaign of 1840 and the Fremont campaign of 1850
House of Representatives, United States of America, 1850-1852 representing Pittsburgh
House of Representatives, United States of America, 1852-1854 representing Pittsburgh
Republican Party of the U.S., a Founding Member, 1858
Electoral College Delegate from Pennsylvania, 1860, cast vote for A. Lincoln
Candidate for Governor of Pennsylvania, 1859, defeated by Gov. Andrew Curtin
Declined gubernatorial nomination in 1863
Declined nomination for appointment as Secretary of the Treasury by President U.S. Grant
Declined nomination for appointment as Secretary of War by President Rutherford B. Hayes

== Philanthropic interests ==
Pittsburgh Chamber of Commerce, President from its inception to his death.
Trustee, together with Mr. Josiah King, of the Estate of The Reverend Charles Avery, an uncle of Mrs. Howe and a business partner of Mr. Howe, an estate in excess of $1 million in 1858, devoted "to abolitionist causes and educational institutions for the elevation of the colored-race of the United States and Africa having been so well managed by the Trustees that after initial disbursements the residuary estate of $300K was three times that amount when the estate was settled in the 1870s.
Zion Hill Collegiate Institute, Benefactor
Avery College, Benefactor

== Military activities ==
Assistant Adjutant General for the Western District of the Commonwealth of Pennsylvania, 1861-1865, appointed by Governor Andrew G. Curtin
Commandant, Headquarters, Western Pennsylvania Military District including Allegheny and adjacent Counties of Western Pennsylvania, 1861-1865 Commandant, Camp Howe in Pittsburgh, the marshalling area for conscripts for Pennsylvania militia units joining the Union Army, 1862-1863, covering much of South Oakland where the University of Pittsburgh and Carnegie-Mellon University now stand.

== Religious affiliations ==
Trinity Episcopal Church (Cathedral), Junior Warden, Vestryman for more than thirty years.
Calvary Episcopal Church (East Liberty) Junior Warden, Vestryman instrumental in the erection of the original church. Chancel windows in the second Calvary Church at Walnut Street and Shady Avenue, were donated in honor of General and Mrs. Howe, and their daughters Alice B. Howe and Eleanor Howe Nimick by Mrs. Florence Howe Guthrie, Mrs. Clara Howe Brown, Mrs. Jennie Corcoran, George A. Howe and Francis B. Nimick.
Delegate, General Convention of the Episcopal Church, 1874 and elected to attend the succeeding convention.

== See also ==
- Crucible Industries

U.S. House of Representatives
Preceded by Moses Hampton	Member of the U.S. House of Representatives from Pennsylvania's 21st congressional district 1851 - 1853	Succeeded by David Ritchie
Preceded by John W. Howe	Member of the U.S. House of Representatives from Pennsylvania's 22nd congressional district 1853 - 1855	Succeeded by Samuel A. Purviance
