= Philip S. Markley =

American politician (1789–1834)

Philip Swenk Markley (July 2, 1789 – September 12, 1834) was an American politician from Pennsylvania who served as a member of the U.S. House of Representatives for Pennsylvania's 5th congressional district from 1823 to 1827 and as Attorney General of Pennsylvania from 1829 to 1830.

== Early life and education ==
Markley was born in Skippack, Pennsylvania. He moved to Norristown, studied law, was admitted to the bar in 1810 and commenced the practice of law.

== Career ==
He was deputy State’s attorney for Pennsylvania 1819 and 1820 and a member of the Pennsylvania State Senate for the 7th district from 1820 to 1823. He was elected as a Jackson Republican to the Eighteenth Congress and reelected as an Adams Party candidate to the Nineteenth Congress. He was an unsuccessful candidate for reelection in 1826 to the Twentieth Congress. He was appointed naval officer of Philadelphia by President John Quincy Adams and served from 1827 to 1829. He served as attorney general of Pennsylvania in 1829. He died in Norristown in 1834.

== Sources ==
- United States Congress. "Philip S. Markley (id: M000135)". Biographical Directory of the United States Congress.
- The Political Graveyard

Pennsylvania State Senate
Preceded by George Weaver	Member of the Pennsylvania Senate, 7th district 1820-1823	Succeeded by Matthew Henderson
U.S. House of Representatives
Preceded by John Findlay; James McSherry	Member of the U.S. House of Representatives from Pennsylvania's 5th congressional district 1823–1827	Succeeded by John Benton Sterigere
Legal offices
Preceded by Amos Ellmaker	Attorney General of Pennsylvania; 1829–1830	Succeeded by Samuel Douglas
