= Amos Ellmaker =

American politician (1787–1851)

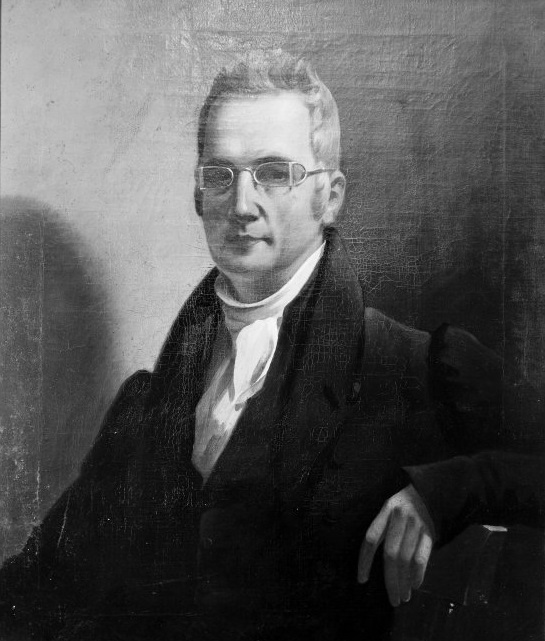

Attorney General of Pennsylvania
- In office May 6, 1828 – August 17, 1829
- Governor: John Andrew Shulze
- Preceded by: Calvin Blythe
- Succeeded by: Philip S. Markley
- In office December 21, 1816 – July 7, 1819
- Governor: Simon Snyder; William Findlay
- Preceded by: Jared Ingersoll
- Succeeded by: Thomas Sergeant

Personal details
- Born: February 2, 1787 Leacock Township, Pennsylvania, U.S.
- Died: November 28, 1851 (aged 64) Lancaster, Pennsylvania, U.S.
- Party: Democratic-Republican (Before 1828); Anti-Masonic (1828–1840)
- Education: Litchfield Law School

Amos Ellmaker (February 2, 1787 – November 28, 1851) was a U.S. politician, attorney, and judge from Pennsylvania. He served as the Pennsylvania Attorney General and was the Anti-Masonic vice presidential candidate in the 1832 presidential election.

Born in Lancaster County, Pennsylvania, he established a legal career in Harrisburg, Pennsylvania after attending Litchfield Law School. During the War of 1812, he served as an aide to General John Forster. After serving in the Pennsylvania House of Representatives, Ellmaker accepted appointment as the Pennsylvania Attorney General. He returned to private practice in 1819 and helped found the Pennsylvania Railroad and the Philadelphia and Columbia Railroad.

From 1828 to 1829, Ellmaker served another term as Pennsylvania Attorney General. In 1832, Ellmaker was nominated as the Anti-Masonic vice presidential candidate. The ticket of William Wirt and Ellmaker took 7.8% of the national popular vote and won the state of Vermont. Ellmaker sought election to the United States Senate in 1834 but was defeated by James Buchanan. After the election, Ellmaker retired from politics and practiced law in Lancaster, Pennsylvania.

== Education ==
Amos Ellmaker was born in Leacock Township, Lancaster County, Pennsylvania on a property called, "Apple Bottom", the son of Peter Ellmaker and Susannah (Carpenter) Ellmaker. He graduated from Princeton College in 1805, attended the Litchfield Law School, and continued his legal studies under James Hopkins, the same Lancaster attorney who trained James Buchanan. Ellmaker completed his studies in the Harrisburg office of Thomas Elder, whose daughter he later married. In 1808, Ellmaker was admitted to the bar and began practicing law in Harrisburg.

== Public service ==
On Jan. 13, 1809, at age 21, Ellmaker was appointed deputy attorney general for Dauphin County, Pennsylvania.

He served in the Pennsylvania House of Representatives in 1813 and 1814, elected from the legislative district composed of Dauphin and Lebanon Counties.

He volunteered for the militia during the War of 1812 and served in 1814 as aide-de-camp to Brigadier General John Forster during the Chesapeake Campaign. While in this position, he was elected to the Fourteenth Congress from the congressional district consisting of Lancaster, Dauphin, and Lebanon Counties, but never filled that office. On July 3, 1815 Ellmaker was appointed Judge of the Twelfth Judicial District of Pennsylvania, composed of Dauphin, Lebanon, and Schuylkill Counties.

Ellmaker resigned from the bench in December 1816 to accept Governor Simon Snyder's appointment as Pennsylvania Attorney General. Governor William Findlay re-appointed him in 1818, and Ellmaker served until December 1819.

In 1817, Ellmaker declined an offer from James Monroe to serve as Secretary of War. During his career, he also twice turned down offers of appointment as Secretary of the Commonwealth, and twice as justice of the Supreme Court of Pennsylvania.

In 1821, Ellmaker moved from Harrisburg to Lancaster, where he continued to practice law.

=== Pennsylvania Railroad ===
In 1823, Ellmaker was an original incorporator of the Pennsylvania Railroad. In 1826, he was an original incorporator of the Columbia, Lancaster and Philadelphia Railroad, as was James Buchanan.

In May 1828, Ellmaker returned to the office of state Attorney General, and served until August 1829.

=== 1832 Presidential campaign ===
In 1832, Ellmaker was the candidate for Vice President on the Anti-Masonic ticket, with William Wirt as the candidate for president. Wirt and Ellmaker won in Vermont, and received seven electoral votes.

In 1834, Ellmaker ran for the United States Senate, losing to James Buchanan. After this election, Ellmaker retired from politics and continued the practice of law.

In 1838, the Lancaster Female Seminary was incorporated, with Ellmaker as one of the original 10 trustees.

== Personal life ==
In 1816, Ellmaker married Mary Rachael Elder (born December 31, 1799 in Harrisburg, Pennsylvania; died March 15, 1866), the daughter of Thomas Elder. They had two sons, Nathaniel (born April 28, 1817 in Harrisburg) and Levi Ellmaker (born 1828 in Harrisburg).

== Death and burial ==
On November 28, 1851, Ellmaker died in Lancaster, Pennsylvania. He was buried in the churchyard of St. James' Episcopal Church in Lancaster.

Legal offices
Preceded by Jared Ingersoll	Attorney General of Pennsylvania; 1816–1819	Succeeded by Thomas Sergeant
Preceded by Calvin Blythe	Attorney General of Pennsylvania; 1828–1829	Succeeded by Philip S. Markley
Party political offices
New political party	Anti-Masonic nominee for Vice President of the United States; 1832	Succeeded by Francis Granger; Endorsed
