= William M. Meredith =

American lawyer and politician (1799–1873)

William Meredith
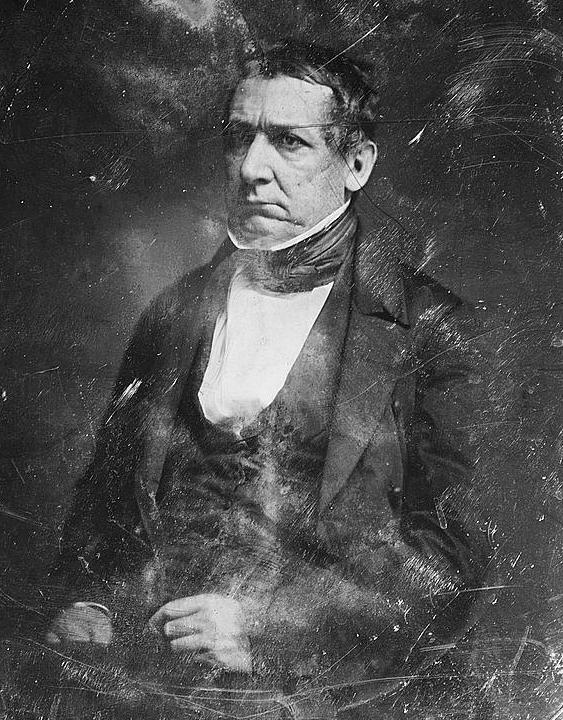

Attorney General of Pennsylvania
- In office June 3, 1861 – January 16, 1867
- Governor: Andrew Gregg Curtin
- Preceded by: Samuel Anderson Purviance
- Succeeded by: Benjamin H. Brewster

19th United States Secretary of the Treasury
- In office March 8, 1849 – July 22, 1850
- President: Zachary Taylor; Millard Fillmore
- Preceded by: Robert J. Walker
- Succeeded by: Thomas Corwin

United States Attorney for the Eastern District of Pennsylvania
- In office 1841–1845
- President: William Henry Harrison; John Tyler
- Preceded by: John M. Read
- Succeeded by: Thomas M. Pettit

President of the Philadelphia City Council
- In office 1834–1849

Member of the Pennsylvania House of Representatives
- In office 1824–1828

Personal details
- Born: June 8, 1799 Philadelphia, Pennsylvania, U.S.
- Died: August 17, 1873 (aged 74) Philadelphia, Pennsylvania, U.S.
- Party: Federalist (Before 1824); Whig (1834–1854); Republican (1854–1873)
- Spouse: Catherine Keppele (1834–1854)
- Children: 5
- Education: University of Pennsylvania (BA)

William Morris Meredith (June 8, 1799 – August 17, 1873) was an American lawyer and politician from Philadelphia, Pennsylvania. He served as the United States Secretary of the Treasury, during President Zachary Taylor's Administration.

== Early and family life ==
Born on June 8, 1799, in Philadelphia, Pennsylvania, William Morris Meredith was the eldest son of William Tuckey Meredith (died 1844), a successful attorney and after 1814 president of Schuylkill Bank, who narrowly lost to Nicholas Biddle the presidency of the Bank of the United States. During the year he was admitted to the Pennsylvania Bar, 1795, William Tuckey Meredith married the writer and poet Gertrude Gouverneur Meredith (née Ogden) (died 1828). Gertrude was the niece of Lewis Morris, as well as of Gouverneur Morris, and highly educated and respected in her own right, as well as published in Dennie's Port Folio. The couple ultimately had eleven children. William Tuckey Meredith served on the Philadelphia Common and Select Councils, and on the Vestry of Christ Episcopal Church, among other leadership positions in the city. His brother Jonathan Meredith (d. 1872) was a leader of the Bar in Baltimore, Maryland. Another brother was the Civil War colonel Sullivan A. Meredith.

William M. Meredith graduated from the University of Pennsylvania in 1812 (graduation at age 13 not being unusual at the time). After assisting his father in the family's saddlery business, he read law, and was himself admitted to the Pennsylvania Bar.

After his mother's death in 1828, William Morris Meredith helped raise his younger siblings. On June 17, 1834, at the age of 35 and after a ten-year engagement, Meredith married the former Catherine Keppele (d. 1854). They had one son (William, b. 1838, later a published essayist and poet) and four daughters: Gertrude Gouverneur Meredith, Euphemia Ogden Meredith, Elizabeth Caldwell Meredith, Catherine Keppele Meredith. Catherine Meredith also helped care for her husband's siblings, and his father when he was disabled by a stroke in 1839.

== Career ==
Meredith was admitted to the bar in 1817, and began practicing law. He drew considerable public attention, as did his slightly senior colleague James C. Biddle (later his brother-in-law), by questioning the conduct of Judge Frank Hallowell in Commonwealth v. Cook, a murder case in which three black men were charged with killing a boy. During the jury's deliberation, the American Daily Advertiser published an article which defense counsel thought highly biased. The judge allowed counsel to question jurors as to whether they read the article, and when the judge refused to dismiss a juror who said he was offended by Meredith's questioning, complained such that the judge held both lawyers in contempt of court and ordered them jailed for 30 days, despite considerable public sympathy. Upon their release, they secured release of two of the prisoners in an appeal on double jeopardy grounds. This gained Meredith a reputation for fearlessness and inflexible honesty, and he was elected President of the Philadelphia Bar Association the following year.

A Federalist, Meredith was then elected to the Pennsylvania House, where he served in the minority for five years, from 1824 to 1828, the year of his mother's death (during which his father was grief-stricken and never fully recovered). One of his accomplishments was establishment of a House of Refuge for juvenile offenders, and he served as that institution's manager, and also on the board of the Pennsylvania Institution for the Deaf and Dumb, in which capacity he continued to serve for many years until his death.

Meredith was president of the Philadelphia City Council from 1834 until 1849, and was a delegate to the Pennsylvania Constitutional Convention in 1837. That same year, he was elected as a member to the American Philosophical Society. Meredith also served as United States Attorney for the Eastern District of Pennsylvania from 1841 to 1845. During that time, he prosecuted Alexander Holmes for manslaughter in the William Brown case.

A successful attorney, particularly after he secured termination of the German Lutheran Church's interment rights in Franklin Square in Commonwealth v. Allmyer, Meredith owned the Wheatland Estate in Lancaster, Pennsylvania, from May 1845 until December 1848 before selling it to future president James Buchanan.

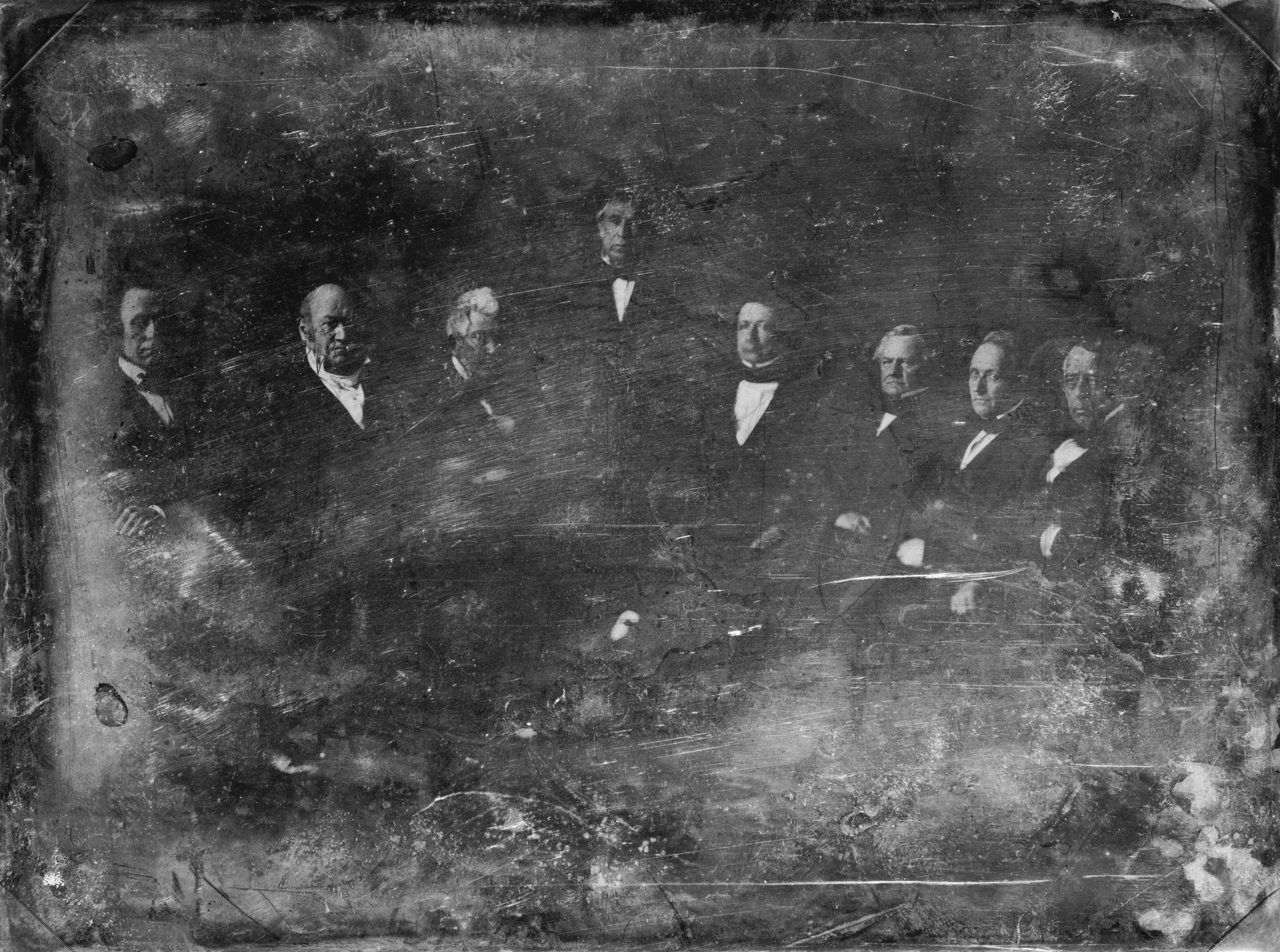
The Zachary Taylor Administration, 1849 Daguerreotype by Mathew Brady From left to right: William B. Preston, Thomas Ewing, John M. Clayton, Zachary Taylor, William M. Meredith, George W. Crawford, Jacob Collamer and Reverdy Johnson, (1849).

President Zachary Taylor, wanting a Pennsylvania Whig for his cabinet, appointed William M. Meredith to be the 19th Secretary of the Treasury. He began his term in office on March 8, 1849.

Meredith strongly opposed the free trade legislation passed the year before under his predecessor Robert J. Walker. He felt that there was a need to protect the American workman, who was subject to competition from poorly paid European labor. Meredith's principal contribution in office was his Annual Report of 1849 in which he set forth an elaborate argument for a protective tariff.

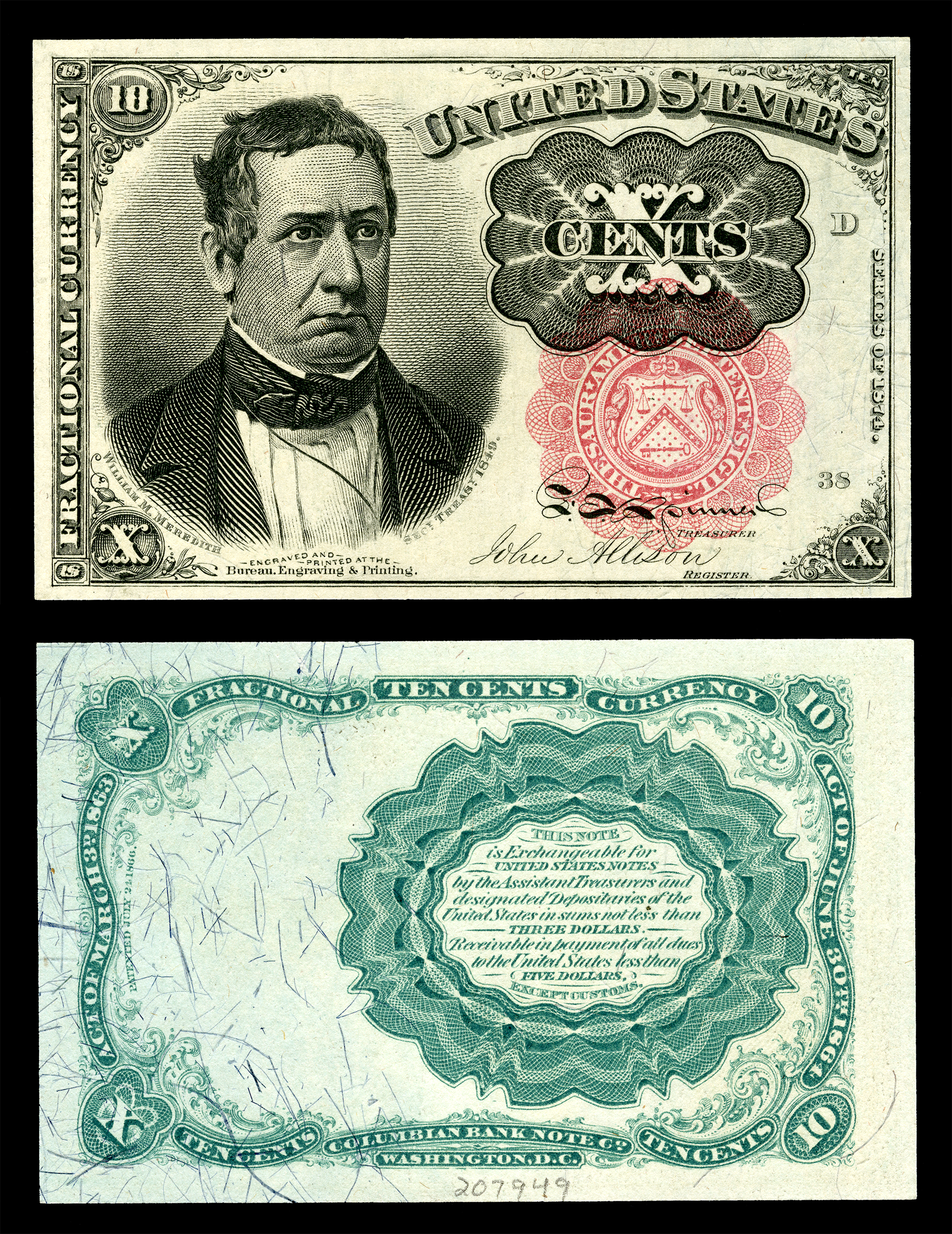
Meredith depicted on the 5th issue 10-cent Fractional currency note.

The increase in the public debt due to the Mexican–American War and the acquisition of California gave Meredith additional argument for raising revenue through higher import duties, but no action was taken on the tariff during Meredith's term. He also recommended a revision of the Coast Survey Code, which had not been changed since its implementation in 1806. The Coast Survey had seen great expansion and improvement with the introduction of steam powered ships and was in need of revision. Meredith resigned from his office as Secretary of the Treasury, upon President Taylor's death in 1850.

== Civil War and later legal career ==
Meredith was elected Pennsylvania's attorney general in the 1860 election, and served for two terms (from 1861 until 1867). In 1861, as a delegate to a Peace Conference, he worked unsuccessfully to prevent the southern states from seceding from the Union. His brother Sullivan Amory Meredith had served in the Mexican War, and became a Brigadier General of Union Volunteers, commissioned in 1862, and the brothers helped assure Pennsylvania met its quota of troops. His son William served for a brief period as secretary to Major General George A. McCall, but his stutter and problems with cataracts caused him to resign that position.

William Meredith later served as a member of a commission working out the settlement of the Alabama claims, in 1870. The following year, President Ulysses Grant asked Meredith to travel to Geneva as senior counsel for the United States in an international arbitration proceeding, but he declined the position due to ill health. His last political post was as President of the 1872 Republican National Convention.

== Death and legacy ==
Coat of Arms of William Meredith

Meredith died in Philadelphia in August 1873, at the age of 74. His wife, Catherine had died in 1854. Both are interred at the Christ Church Burial Ground in Philadelphia.

The Historical Society of Pennsylvania holds the Meredith family papers. A Philadelphia school was named in his honor in 1931, and remains active today.

Meredith received one of only two 1849 Double Eagles while serving as Treasury Secretary. That 1849 Double Eagle is a pattern coin. The other coin is on display at the Smithsonian Institution. The coin was auctioned as part of his estate but its subsequent whereabouts are unknown.

Political offices
Preceded by Robert J. Walker	U.S. Secretary of the Treasury; Served under: Zachary Taylor; 1849–1850	Succeeded by Thomas Corwin
Legal offices
Preceded by Samuel Anderson Purviance	Attorney General of Pennsylvania; 1861–1867	Succeeded by Benjamin H. Brewster
