= James Cooper (Pennsylvania politician) =

American politician (1810–1863)

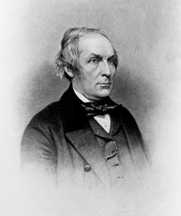

United States Senator from Pennsylvania
- In office March 4, 1849 – March 4, 1855
- Preceded by: Simon Cameron
- Succeeded by: William Bigler

Attorney General of Pennsylvania
- In office July 31, 1848 – December 30, 1848
- Governor: William F. Johnston
- Preceded by: Benjamin Champneys
- Succeeded by: Cornelius Darragh

Member of the United States House of Representatives from Pennsylvania's 12th district
- In office March 4, 1839 – March 3, 1843
- Preceded by: Daniel Sheffer
- Succeeded by: Almon H. Read

Member of the Pennsylvania House of Representatives
- In office 1840

Personal details
- Born: May 8, 1810 Frederick County, Maryland, U.S.
- Died: March 28, 1863 (aged 52) Columbus, Ohio, U.S.
- Resting place: Mount Olivet Cemetery; Frederick, Maryland, U.S.
- Party: Whig
- Spouse: Jane Mary Miller
- Education: Mount St. Mary's University
- Alma mater: Washington College
- Profession: Politician, lawyer

Military service
- Allegiance: United States of America; Union
- Branch/service: Union Army
- Years of service: 1861–1863
- Rank: Brigadier General
- Battles/wars: American Civil War

James Cooper (May 8, 1810 – March 28, 1863) was an American lawyer, soldier, and politician, who served in the United States Congress.

== Early life ==
James Cooper was born on May 8, 1810, in Frederick County, Maryland. In 1829, he enrolled in Mount St. Mary's University, but moved to Washington College (later Washington & Jefferson College). He graduated from Washington College in 1832. He studied law and was admitted to the bar in 1834.

== Career ==
Cooper started practicing law in Gettysburg, Pennsylvania, in the office of Thaddeus Stevens. He was elected as a Whig to the 26th and 27th congresses; serving from March 4, 1839, to March 3, 1843. In the 27th congress, he was chairman of the indian affairs committee. He served as a member of the Pennsylvania House of Representatives from 1843 to 1844 and in 1846 and 1848. He was speaker of the house for one term in 1847. In 1848, he was attorney general of Pennsylvania. He was elected to the United States Senate; serving from March 4, 1849, to March 3, 1855.

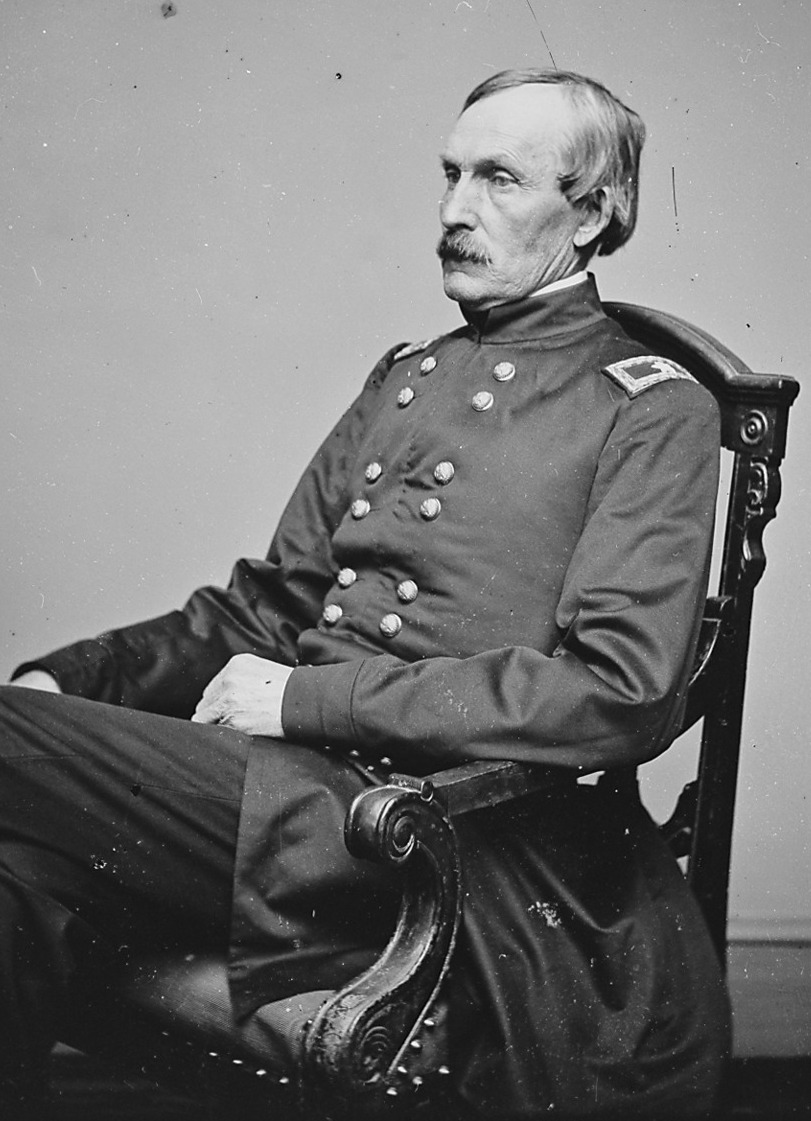
General James Cooper

When the American Civil War started, Cooper raised a brigade of volunteers in Maryland and was appointed brigadier general of volunteers in May 1861. His brigade served in Franz Sigel's division during the Shenandoah Valley Campaign. In poor health, he was assigned as commandant of Camp Chase, a military staging, training and prison camp near Columbus, Ohio.

== Personal life ==
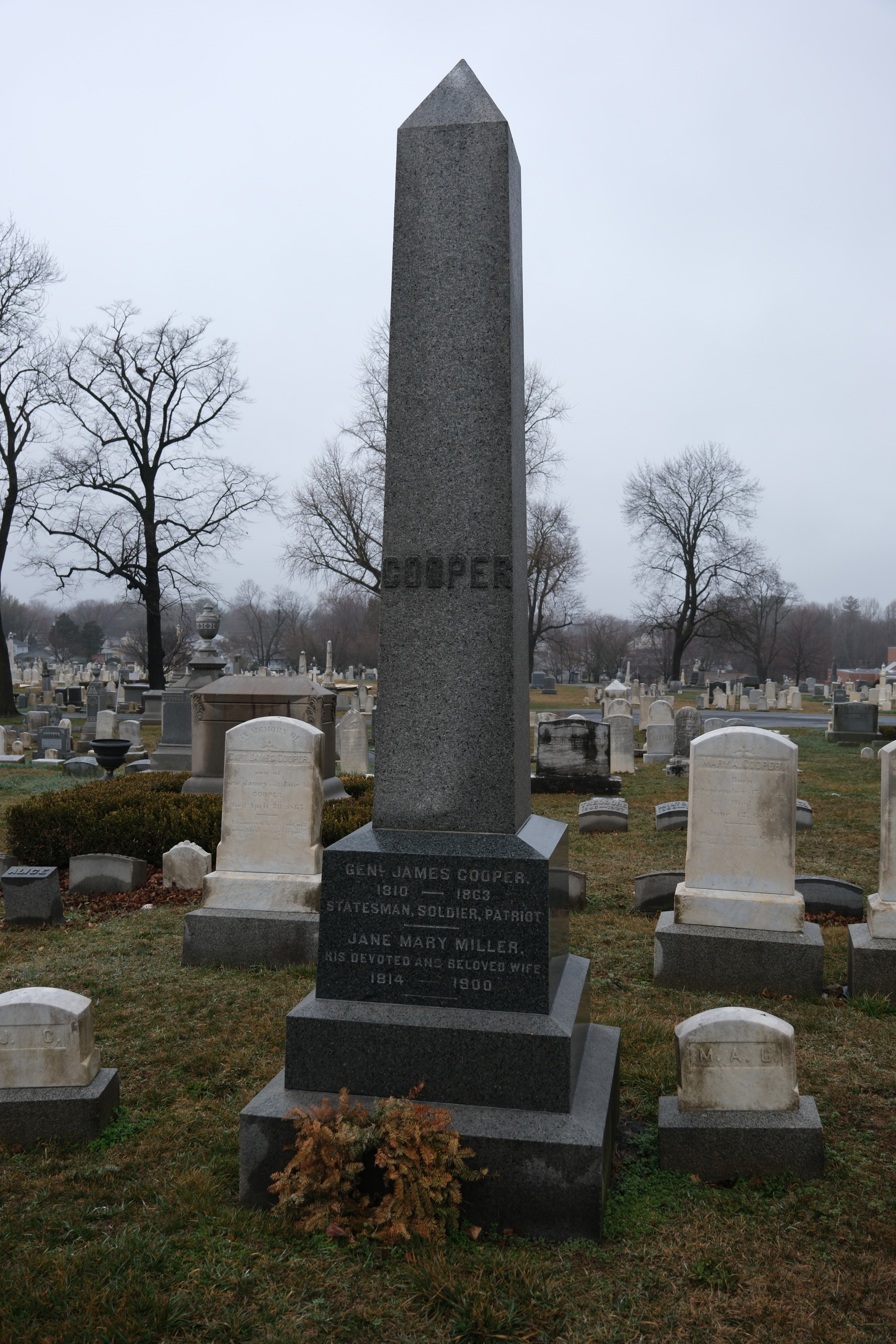
Grave of Cooper at Mount Olivet Cemetery

Copper died on March 28, 1863, at the American Hotel in Columbus. He was buried in Mount Olivet Cemetery in Frederick, Maryland.

== See also ==
- List of American Civil War generals (Union)
- Speaker of the Pennsylvania House of Representatives

U.S. House of Representatives
Preceded by Daniel Sheffer	Member of the U.S. House of Representatives from Pennsylvania's 12th congressional district March 4, 1839 – March 4, 1843	Succeeded by Almon H. Read
Legal offices
Preceded by Benjamin Champneys	Attorney General of Pennsylvania; 1848	Succeeded by Cornelius Darragh
U.S. Senate
Preceded by Simon Cameron	U.S. senator (Class 3) from Pennsylvania; March 4, 1849 – March 4, 1855; Served alongside: Daniel Sturgeon and Richard Brodhead	Succeeded by William Bigler
