= Calvin Blythe =

American lawyer and judge (1790–1849)

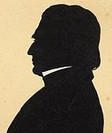
- Silhouette by Auguste Edouart, 1843

Pennsylvania Secretary of State
- In office November 28, 1827 – December 16, 1829
- Preceded by: Isaac D. Barnard
- Succeeded by: Samuel McKean

Pennsylvania Attorney General
- In office February 5, 1828 – May 6, 1828
- Governor: John Andrew Shulze
- Preceded by: Frederick Smith
- Succeeded by: Amos Ellmaker

Personal details
- Born: 1790; Hamiltonban Township, Adams County. Pennsylvania
- Died: June 20, 1849; Hamiltonban Township, Adams County. Pennsylvania
- Spouse: Patience Elliott

Calvin Blythe (1790 – June 20, 1849) was a Pennsylvania lawyer and judge. He served as state Secretary of State and briefly as Attorney General.

== Biography and career ==
Blythe's father was David Blythe, who came from Scotland, and fought in the Revolutionary War fighting at Trenton and Princeton. His mother was originally Elizabeth Finley, a niece of Samuel Finley.

Blythe graduated from Dickinson College, and then studied law. He interrupted his studies and fought in the War of 1812, serving with his brother Samuel. He saw action at Chippewa, Lundy's Lane, Buffalo, and Fort Erie, and was noted for his bravery. After the war, he completed his legal education and then started practicing in Juniata County.

In 1827 he was appointed state Secretary of State, to fulfill the vacancy formed when the incumbent became Senator. During this term, he was appointed state Attorney General, to fulfill the vacancy formed when the incumbent accepted a judgeship, but he served only three months.

In 1828, he married Patience Elliot, the daughter of a judge. Their children included Calvin Blythe Jr., later a doctor.

From 1830 until 1839, and again from 1842 until 1843, he was President Judge of Pennsylvania's Twelfth Judicial District. From 1843 until 1845, he was Collector of Customs for the Port of Philadelphia. From 1845 until his death, he was in private practice in Philadelphia.

In 1832, the newly founded Pennsylvania College of Gettysburg appointed Blythe to their Board of Trustees, which he served on until 1844. He was the first (1832–5) and third (1838–43) president of the board. He spoke at the College's opening ceremonies.

== Legacy ==
Blythe Township, Schuylkill County, formed in 1846, was named after him.

Political offices
Preceded by Isaac D. Barnard	Pennsylvania Secretary of State; 1827–1829	Succeeded by Samuel McKean
Legal offices
Preceded by Frederick Smith	Pennsylvania Attorney General; 1828	Succeeded by Amos Ellmaker
