= Francis Wade Hughes =

American lawyer and politician

Attorney General of Pennsylvania
- In office March 14, 1853 – January 17, 1855
- Governor: William Bigler
- Preceded by: James Campbell
- Succeeded by: Thomas E. Franklin

Secretary of the Commonwealth of Pennsylvania
- In office January 21, 1852 – March 14, 1853
- Preceded by: Alexander L. Russell
- Succeeded by: Charles Alexander Black

Member of the Pennsylvania Senate, 8th district
- In office 1843–1844
- Preceded by: James Mathers
- Succeeded by: Henry C. Eyer

Personal details
- Born: August 20, 1817 Upper Merion Township, Montgomery County, Pennsylvania, US
- Died: October 22, 1885 (aged 68)
- Party: Democratic
- Spouse: Elizabeth Silliman
- Occupation: Lawyer, politician

Francis Wade Hughes (August 10, 1817 – October 20, 1885) was an American lawyer and politician from Pennsylvania. He served as a Democratic member of the Pennsylvania Senate for the 8th district from 1843 to 1844. He served as Secretary of the Commonwealth of Pennsylvania from 1852 to 1853 and as Attorney General of Pennsylvania from 1853 to 1855. Although pro-Union, he was tarred as a secessionist "traitor" in the press during the 1862 elections, ending his political career. During the 1870s, he was the chief prosecutor in the Molly Maguires trials.

== Early life and education ==
Hughes was born the fifth and youngest child of John Hughes and Hannah Bartholomew. He studied law in Pottsville, Schuylkill County and Philadelphia. He was admitted to the bar of Schuylkill County in 1837.

== Career ==
He was appointed Deputy Attorney General (Note: Today called District Attorney.) of the county in 1839. He would resign three times and be reappointed over the next eleven years.

Hughes was elected to the Pennsylvania Senate for the 8th district and served from 1843 to 1844. In 1852, he was appointed Secretary of the Commonwealth, which he resigned in 1853 to become Attorney General.

As chairman of the 1862 Democratic State Committee, Hughes was singled out for vilification. His family ties in the Confederacy were played up, and worse, a draft resolution he authored (but never introduced) for the 1860 convention, suggesting Pennsylvania might secede, was attacked. Hughes was forced to resign, and never returned to politics.

In 1876, he was the chief prosecutor in the Molly Maguires cases. He had previously never prosecuted homicide cases and frequently defended with success those facing capital punishment.

== Personal life ==
He married Sarah Silliman, of Pottsville, in 1839.

== Notes ==
Political offices
Preceded by James Mathers	Member of the Pennsylvania Senate, 8th district 1843-1844	Succeeded by Henry C. Eyer
Preceded by Alexander L. Russell	Secretary of the Commonwealth of Pennsylvania; 1852–1853	Succeeded by Charles Alexander Black
Legal offices
Preceded by James Campbell	Attorney General of Pennsylvania; 1853–1856	Succeeded by Thomas E. Franklin
