= Samuel Douglas =

American politician

15th Attorney General of Pennsylvania
- In office February 10, 1830 – January 29, 1833
- Governor: George Wolf
- Preceded by: Philip Markley
- Succeeded by: Ellis Lewis

Personal details
- Born: 1781 County Londonderry, Ireland
- Died: July 8, 1833 (aged 51–52) Harrisburg, Pennsylvania
- Spouse: Louisa Wyeth
- Profession: Attorney

Samuel Douglas (1781 – July 8, 1833) was an American lawyer who served as the Pennsylvania Attorney General.

== Personal life and career ==
Douglas was born in Ireland, the son of Henry Douglas and Jane Blair, a descendant of the Scottish warlord known as the "Black Douglas". He was educated in Scotland, and came to America when he was about seventeen. He joined his older brother, the Reverend Joseph Douglas, who was living in Pittsburgh. Douglas studied law and was admitted to the bar in 1804.

In 1817, Douglas ran for Congress against Henry Baldwin and lost. That year he moved to Harrisburg, where he met Louisa Wyeth, whom he married shortly afterwards.

In 1819, Douglas was appointed Deputy Attorney General for Dauphin County. He was appointed Attorney General in 1830. His term ended in 1833, and he died that summer.

Legal offices
Preceded by Philip Markley	Attorney General of Pennsylvania; 1830–1833	Succeeded by Ellis Lewis
