= Moses Hampton Todd =

American lawyer

Pennsylvania Attorney General
- In office January 16, 1903 – January 17, 1919
- Governor: Edwin Sydney Stuart
- Preceded by: Hampton L. Carson
- Succeeded by: John C. Bell

Personal details
- Born: August 31, 1845; Philadelphia, Pennsylvania, US
- Died: November 7, 1935 (aged 90); Philadelphia, Pennsylvania, US
- Spouse: Alice Euphemia Feree
- Children: 4

Moses Hampton Todd (August 31, 1845 – November 7, 1935) was a Pennsylvania lawyer, who served as state Attorney General.

== Biography and career ==
Todd was born in 1845, son of James Todd, a well-known Philadelphia lawyer and former state legislator and Attorney General, and his second wife, Jane Miller. In 1852, the elder Todd retired and the family moved to Greenberg. Upon the elder Todd's death in 1863, the family moved to Uniontown.

Todd attended Washington & Jefferson College for three years, then read law and was admitted to the bar of Fayette County in 1868. He was then admitted to the bar of Philadelphia in 1869, and assisted Theodore Cuyler there. Todd opened his own offices in Philadelphia in 1875.

Todd married Alice Euphemia Feree (1846–1930) in 1870. They had 4 children.

Todd was appointed as state Attorney General in 1903, and served until 1919. In his first year, he was the "dominant figure in the prosecution in the capitol graft case".

Todd is buried at Section W, Lots 23 & 25 of Laurel Hill Cemetery in Philadelphia.

Legal offices
| Preceded by Hampton L. Carson | Attorney General of Pennsylvania; 1907–1911 | Succeeded by John C. Bell |
