= Pennsylvania Attorney General =

Attorney general for the U.S. state of Pennsylvania

Attorney General of the Commonwealth of Pennsylvania
- Seal of the attorney general of Pennsylvania

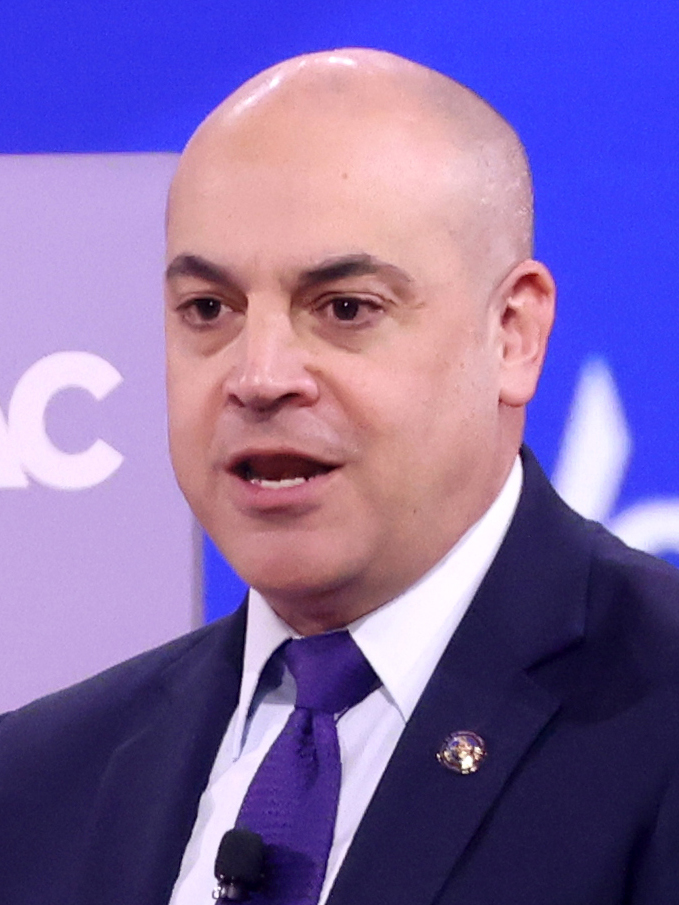
- Incumbent; Dave Sunday since January 21, 2025
- Appointer: Direct popular vote
- Term length: Four years, renewable once consecutively
- Formation: 1683
- Salary: $162,000 per year
- Website: Official website

The Pennsylvania attorney general is the chief law enforcement officer of the Commonwealth of Pennsylvania. It became an elected office in 1980. The current attorney general is Republican Dave Sunday.

On August 15, 2016, then-attorney general Kathleen Kane was convicted of criminal charges, including conspiracy, perjury, and obstruction of justice, and announced her resignation the following day, effective August 17. Consequently, as the solicitor general, Bruce Castor assumed the office as acting attorney general. Governor Tom Wolf nominated Bruce Beemer to serve out the remaining balance of Kane's term, which expired in January 2017. Democrat Josh Shapiro succeeded Beemer. Shapiro was elected governor in 2022, and appointed Michelle Henry as his successor in 2023. The Pennsylvania Senate confirmed Henry in her own right later that year.

== Authority and responsibilities ==
The Commonwealth Attorneys Act of 1980 established the Office of Attorney General as an independent office headed by an elected attorney general. The office has the responsibility for the prosecution of those crimes prosecuted by the commonwealth, including organized crime and public corruption, as well as civil litigation on behalf of some, but not all, commonwealth agencies and the civil enforcement of some commonwealth laws, including laws pertaining to consumer protection and charities. The attorney general may act on behalf of consumers to issue cease and desist orders. The attorney general represents the commonwealth in all actions brought by or against the commonwealth and reviews all proposed rules and regulations by commonwealth agencies.

The attorney general also serves on the Board of Pardons, the joint Committee on Documents, the Hazardous Substances Transportation Board, the Board of Finance and Revenue, the Pennsylvania Commission on Crime and Delinquency, the Civil Disorder Commission, and the Municipal Police Officers Education and Training Commission.

== History ==
Results by county of the 1978 attorney general referendum Yes: 80–90%; 70–80%; 60–70%

In 1978, Pennsylvania voters approved an amendment to the Pennsylvania Constitution that gave the electorate the power to elect the attorney general, rather than the position being appointed by the governor.

== List of attorneys general ==
There have been four styles of selection for the Pennsylvania attorney general. The first phase was colonial, with the first attorney general commissioned in 1683. At the outbreak of the Revolution, the sitting attorney general, a loyalist, fled, and new attorneys general were appointed, under the Constitution of 1776, by the state president (or vice-president) with the Supreme Executive Council. Under the new constitution of 1790, attorneys general were appointed by the governor, subject to approval by the legislature (similar to how the United States Attorney General is appointed by the president of the United States). This remained in the Constitutions of 1838, 1874, and 1968. In 1978, voters approved an amendment to the Pennsylvania Constitution making the office of the Pennsylvania Attorney General an elected position, effective as of the general election of 1980.

Note that before William Penn, there were attorneys general for New Sweden as early as 1643.

=== Colonial attorneys general ===
Under the influence of David Lloyd, who served 1686–1710, Pennsylvania developed its first judicial system. Andrew Hamilton, who served 1717–1726, strongly influenced Pennsylvania law away from some aspects of the British system.

- John White
- Samuel Hersent
- John White
- David Lloyd
- John Moore
- Robert Assheton
- Paromlus Parmyter
- George Lowther
- Thomas Clarke
- Robert Quarry
- Henry Wilson
- Andrew Hamilton
- Joseph Growden Jr.
- John Kinsey
- Tench Francis Sr.
- Benjamin Chew
- Andrew Allen

=== President/Council appointed attorneys general ===
Image	Name	Took office	Left office	Comment
	John Morris Jr.	July 16, 1777	November 1, 1777	pro tem
	Jonathan D. Sergeant	November 1, 1777	November 23, 1780	Resigned
	William Bradford	November 23, 1780	—	Re-commissioned

=== Attorneys general appointed between 1791 and 1920 ===
Image	Name	Took office	Left office	Comment
	William Bradford	June 9, 1791	August 20, 1791	Resigned
	Jared Ingersoll	August 20, 1791	May 10, 1800	
	Joseph B. McKean	May 10, 1800	July 22, 1808	
	Mahlon Dickerson	July 22, 1808	January 9, 1809	
	Walter Franklin	January 9, 1809	October 2, 1810	Resigned
	Joseph Reed	October 2, 1810	January 26, 1811	
	Richard Rush	January 26, 1811	December 13, 1811	
	Jared Ingersoll	December 13, 1811	December 21, 1816	
	Amos Ellmaker	December 21, 1816	July 7, 1819	
	Thomas Sergeant	July 7, 1819	December 20, 1820	
	Thomas Elder	December 20, 1820	December 18, 1823	
	Frederick Smith	December 18, 1823	February 5, 1828	Resigned
	Calvin Blythe	February 5, 1828	May 6, 1828	
	Amos Ellmaker	May 6, 1828	August 17, 1829	
	Philip S. Markley	August 17, 1829	February 10, 1830	
	Samuel Douglas	February 10, 1830	January 29, 1833	
	Ellis Lewis	January 29, 1833	October 14, 1833	Resigned
	George M. Dallas	October 14, 1833	December 1, 1835	
	James Todd	December 18, 1835	April 2, 1838	Resigned
	William B. Reed	April 2, 1838	January 15, 1839	
	Ovid F. Johnson	January 15, 1839	January 21, 1845	
	John K. Kane	January 21, 1845	June 17, 1846	Resigned
	John M. Read	June 23, 1846	December 18, 1846	Resigned
	Benjamin Champneys	December 18, 1846	July 31, 1848	
	James Cooper	July 31, 1848	December 30, 1848	Resigned
	Cornelius Darragh	January 4, 1849	April 28, 1851	
	Thomas E. Franklin	April 28, 1851	January 21, 1852	
	James Campbell	January 21, 1852	March 8, 1853	Resigned
	Francis Wade Hughes	March 14, 1853	January 17, 1855	
	Thomas E. Franklin	January 17, 1855	January 19, 1858	
	John C. Knox	January 19, 1858	January 16, 1861	
	Samuel A. Purviance	January 16, 1861	June 3, 1861	
	William M. Meredith	June 3, 1861	January 16, 1867	
	Benjamin Harris Brewster	January 16, 1867	October 25, 1869	Resigned
	F. Carroll Brewster	October 26, 1869	January 22, 1873	
	Samuel E. Dimmick	January 22, 1873	October 11, 1875	Died in office
	George Lear	December 7, 1875	February 26, 1879	
	Henry W. Palmer	February 26, 1879	January 17, 1883	
	Lewis C. Cassidy	January 17, 1883	January 18, 1887	
	William S. Kirkpatrick	January 18, 1887	January 10, 1891	
	W. U. Hensel	January 10, 1891	January 15, 1895	
	Henry Clay McCormick	January 15, 1895	January 18, 1899	
	John P. Elkin	January 18, 1899	January 21, 1903	
	Hampton L. Carson	January 21, 1903	January 16, 1907	
	Moses Hampton Todd	January 16, 1907	January 17, 1911	
	John C. Bell	January 17, 1911	January 19, 1915	
	Francis Shunk Brown	January 19, 1915	January 21, 1919	
	William I. Schaffer	January 21, 1919	December 14, 1920	Resigned

=== Attorneys general appointed between 1920 and 1980 ===
Image	Name	Took office	Left office	Governor(s)
	George E. Alter	December 14, 1920	January 16, 1923	William Sproul
	George Washington Woodruff	January 16, 1923	January 18, 1927	Gifford Pinchot
	Thomas J. Baldrige	January 18, 1927	January 28, 1929	John Stuchell Fisher
	Cyrus E. Woods	January 28, 1929	November 1, 1930	John Stuchell Fisher
	William A. Schnader	November 1, 1930	January 15, 1935	John Stuchell Fisher
	William A. Schnader	November 1, 1930	January 15, 1935	Gifford Pinchot
	Charles J. Margiotti	January 15, 1935	April 27, 1938	George Howard Earle III
	Guy K. Bard	April 27, 1938	January 17, 1939	George Howard Earle III
	Claude T. Reno	January 17, 1939	December 31, 1942	Arthur James
	E. Russell Shockley	December 31, 1942	January 19, 1943	Arthur James
	James H. Duff	January 19, 1943	January 21, 1947	Edward Martin
	James H. Duff	January 19, 1943	January 21, 1947	John C. Bell Jr.
	T. McKeen Chidsey	January 21, 1947	July 5, 1950	James H. Duff
	Charles J. Margiotti	July 5, 1950	March 2, 1951	James H. Duff
	Charles J. Margiotti	July 5, 1950	March 2, 1951	John S. Fine
	Robert E. Woodside	March 7, 1951	October 1, 1953	John S. Fine
	Frank Truscott	October 13, 1953	January 18, 1955	John S. Fine
	Herbert B. Cohen	January 18, 1955	December 17, 1956	George M. Leader
	Thomas D. McBride	December 17, 1956	December 15, 1958	George M. Leader
	Harrington Adams (acting)	December 16, 1958	January 19, 1959	George M. Leader
	Anne X. Alpern	January 20, 1959	August 28, 1961	David L. Lawrence
	David Henry Stahl	August 29, 1961	January 15, 1963	David L. Lawrence
	Walter E. Alessandroni	January 15, 1963	May 8, 1966	William Scranton
	Edward Friedman	May 11, 1966	January 17, 1967	William Scranton
	William C. Sennett	January 17, 1967	July 3, 1970	Raymond P. Shafer
	Fred Speaker	July 4, 1970	January 19, 1971	Raymond P. Shafer
	J. Shane Creamer	January 25, 1971	December 31, 1972	Milton Shapp
	Israel Packel	January 2, 1973	December 23, 1974	Milton Shapp
	Robert P. Kane	January 6, 1975	June 7, 1978	Milton Shapp
	Gerald Gornish	June 7, 1978	December 31, 1978	Milton Shapp
	J. Justin Blewitt Jr. (acting)	January 1, 1979	January 16, 1979	Milton Shapp
	Edward G. Biester Jr.	January 16, 1979	May 19, 1980	Dick Thornburgh
	Harvey Bartle III	May 20, 1980	January 20, 1981	Dick Thornburgh

=== Occupants of the elected Pennsylvania Attorney General office (1981–present) ===
Image	Name	Took office	Left office
	LeRoy S. Zimmerman	January 20, 1981	January 17, 1989
	Ernie Preate	January 17, 1989	June 23, 1995
	Walter W. Cohen (acting)	June 26, 1995	October 3, 1995
	Tom Corbett	October 3, 1995	January 21, 1997
	Mike Fisher	January 21, 1997	December 15, 2003
	Jerry Pappert	December 18, 2003	January 18, 2005
	Tom Corbett	January 18, 2005	January 18, 2011
	William Ryan (acting)	January 18, 2011	May 27, 2011
	Linda Kelly	May 27, 2011	January 15, 2013
	Kathleen Kane	January 15, 2013	August 17, 2016
	Bruce Castor (acting)	August 17, 2016	August 31, 2016
	Bruce Beemer	August 31, 2016	January 17, 2017
	Josh Shapiro	January 17, 2017	January 17, 2023
	Michelle Henry	January 17, 2023; Acting January 17, 2023 – March 8, 2023	January 21, 2025
	Dave Sunday	January 21, 2025	present

== See also ==
- Governor of Pennsylvania
- Pennsylvania Auditor General
- Pennsylvania Treasurer
- Pennsylvania General Assembly
- Pennsylvania State Capitol
