= Brewster (surname) =

Brewster is an English occupational surname, indicating a female involved in brewing. It may refer to:

== People ==
- Anna Brewster (born 1986), English actress and model
- Benjamin Brewster (disambiguation)
- Caleb Brewster (1747–1827), American spy
- Chauncey B. Brewster (1848–1941) - fifth Bishop of the Episcopal Diocese of Connecticut.
- Clive Brewster-Joske (1896–1947), Australian-Fijian military officer and consular agent in the British Empire
- Cora Belle Brewster (1859–?), American physician, surgeon, medical writer, editor
- Craig Brewster (born 1966), Scottish footballer
- Daniel Brewster (1923–2007), American politician
- David Brewster (disambiguation)
- Diane Brewster (1931–1991), American actress
- Elizabeth Brewster (1922–2012), Canadian poet
- Ethel Hampson Brewster (1886–1947), American educator and philologist
- Few Brewster (1889–1957), Justice of the Supreme Court of Texas
- Flora A. Brewster (1852–1919), American physician, surgeon
- Harlan Carey Brewster (1870–1918), Canadian politician
- Henry Percy Brewster (1816–1884), American lawyer and statesman
- James C. Brewster (1826–1909), co-founder of the Church of Christ (Brewsterite)
- Janet Huntington Brewster (1910–1998), American philanthropist
- John Brewster (disambiguation)
- Jordana Brewster (born 1980), American actress
- June Brewster (1913–1995), American actress
- Kent Brewster (born 1961), American writer, editor and publisher
- Kingman Brewster Jr. (1919–1988), American educator and diplomat
- Lamon Brewster (born 1973), American professional boxer
- Lincoln Brewster (born 1971), American musician
- Love Brewster (c. 1611–c. 1650), settler in colonial America, Mayflower passenger
- Martha Wadsworth Brewster (1710–c. 1757), American poet and writer
- Michael Brewster (disambiguation)
- Murray Brewster, Canadian journalist
- Paget Brewster (born 1969), American actress
- Pete Brewster (1930–2020), American football player
- Ralph Owen Brewster (1888–1961), American politician
- Rhian Brewster (born 2000), English footballer
- Rudi M. Brewster (1932–2012), American federal judge
- Sardius Mason Brewster (1870–1936), Attorney General of Kansas
- Simone Brewster (born c. 1983), British artist and designer
- Stephen Singer-Brewster (born 1945), American astronomer
- Tim Brewster (born 1960), American football player and coach
- Todd Brewster, American print and television journalist
- Tom Brewster (born 1974), Scottish curler
- W. Herbert Brewster (1897–1987), African-American minister and songwriter
- Wally Brewster (born 1960), formally James Walter Brewster Jr., U.S. businessman and diplomat
- William Brewster (disambiguation)
- Wrestling Brewster (1614–before 1644), settler in colonial America, Mayflower passenger
- Yvonne Brewster (1938–2025), Jamaican-born stage director, teacher and writer

== Fictional characters ==
- Bobby Brewster, protagonist of children's stories by H. E. Todd
- Joey Brewster, protagonist of the American radio sitcom That Brewster Boy
- Montgomery Brewster, protagonist of Brewster's Millions, a 1902 novel and its stage and film adaptations (at times with different first names):
  - Brewster's Millions (disambiguation)
- The title character of Punky Brewster, a TV program, and the spinoff animated series It's Punky Brewster
- Tom Brewster, protagonist of the TV series Sugarfoot

== See also ==
- Attorney General Brewster (disambiguation)
- General Brewster (disambiguation)
- Judge Brewster (disambiguation)
- Senator Brewster (disambiguation)
