= Operation Burlington Trail =

Part of the Vietnam War (1968)

- Part of the Vietnam War
Date	8 April – 11 November 1968
Location	Quảng Nam Province, South Vietnam
Result	U.S. operational success

Belligerents
United States	Viet Cong

Commanders and leaders
Col. James Waldie; Col. Charles B. Thomas	

Units involved
198th Infantry Brigade; 1st Squadron, 1st Cavalry Regiment	72nd Main Force Battalion; 74th Local Force Battalion; 105th Local Force Company

Casualties and losses
129 killed	US body count: 1,931 killed

Operation Burlington Trail was a security operation conducted during the Vietnam War by the U.S. 198th Infantry Brigade in Quảng Nam Province, South Vietnam from 8 April to 11 November 1968.

== Background ==
In early April 1968, the 198th Infantry Brigade moved into the Quế Sơn Valley to replace the 3rd Brigade, 4th Infantry Division. On arriving the Brigade was tasked with assisting the 1st Squadron, 1st Cavalry Regiment and the 39th Engineer Battalion in reopening Route 533 between Tam Kỳ and Tiên Phước Camp, 20 kilometers to the southwest. Units of the Army of the Republic of Vietnam (ARVN) 2nd Division would also assist in searching the Viet Cong (VC) Base Area 117 in the mountains south of Route 533, which was believed to shelter the 72nd Main Force Battalion and the 74th Local Force Battalion.

== Operation ==
The operation began on 8 April when Companies C and D 1st Battalion, 46th Infantry Regiment were landed on two hilltops overlooking Route 533 10km southwest of Tam Kỳ.

On 9 April the 1st Battalion, 6th Infantry Regiment was landed on Hill 218, several km west of the 1/46th Infantry positions. The 1/6th Infantry began constructing Firebase Bowman (15.49°N 108.426°E) to serve as the main fire support base for the operation. Meanwhile, Troop A and a platoon from Troop C 1/1st Cavalry, began their advance along Route 533 towards Tiên Phước. The column was ambushed by elements of the VC 72nd Main Force Battalion, but the Cavalry fought through the ambush, killing 33 VC and capturing four.

On 10 April, a VC mortar attack hit Firebase Bowman, killing two Americans and wounding eight. On the afternoon of 13 April Company A 1/6th Infantry, engaged a VC platoon 5 kilometers southwest of Firebase Bowman killing seven VC while another 19 were killed by air strikes. That evening, the VC launched an attack on Company B 1/6th Infantry's night defensive position, wounding 22 Americans.

On 14 April the Cavalry column reached Tiên Phước and by 17 April Route 533 was open to regular traffic.

Later in April the remaining companies of the 1/46th Infantry joined the operation together with Company A, 1st Battalion, 52nd Infantry Regiment, which assumed responsibility for the defense of Firebase Bowman.

On 30 April, a VC force attacked Firebase Bowman losing four dead and wounding eight defenders. On 1 May, Company A 1/46th Infantry, was landed 11km southwest of Bowman and was engaged by a VC force, the VC lost 31 dead before disengaging.

On 23 July elements of the 1/1st Cavalry engaged the VC 105th Local Force Company and elements of the VC 2nd Division's engineer battalion near the southern entrance to the Quế Sơn Valley, 10km northeast of Tam Kỳ killing 68 VC.

The operation continued until 11 November 1968.

== Aftermath ==
VC losses were 1,931 killed, while U.S. losses were 129 killed.
