= General Brewster =

General Brewster may refer to:

- Andre W. Brewster (1862–1942), Major General in the United States Army
  - USS General A. W. Brewster (AP-155), a ship named for the general
- William R. Brewster (1828–1869), American Civil War general

== See also ==
- Attorney General Brewster (disambiguation)
