= John Brewster =

John Brewster may refer to:

- John Brewster (author) (1753–1842), English author and clergyman
- John Brewster Jr. (1766–1854), American painter
- John William Brewster (1930–2019), British politician
- John Brewster (musician) (born 1949), Australian guitarist
- John Alexander Brewster (1826–1889), California Surveyor General

== See also ==
- Jonathan Brewster (disambiguation), multiple persons
