= Evan M. Johnson =

U.S. Army brigadier general (1861–1923)

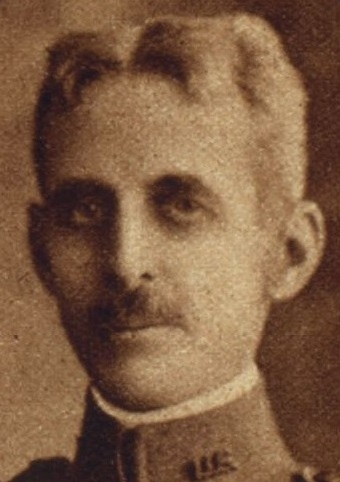
- From 1919's The War of the Nations: Portfolio in Rotogravure Etchings
- Born: September 26, 1861; Brooklyn, New York U.S.
- Died: October 14, 1923 (aged 62); Paris, France
- Burial place: Suresnes American Cemetery and Memorial, Suresnes, France
- Spouse: Bessie Seaman (m. 1896–1915, div.)
- Children: 3
- Military career
- Allegiance: United States
- Branch: United States Army
- Service years: 1882–1922
- Rank: Brigadier General
- Unit: U.S. Army Infantry Branch
- Commands: 3rd Battalion, 29th Infantry Regiment; 19th Infantry Regiment; 5th Infantry Regiment; 29th Infantry Regiment; 154th Infantry Brigade; 77th Division; 158th Infantry Brigade; 79th Division
- Conflicts: Apache Wars; Spanish–American War; Philippine–American War; United States occupation of Veracruz; World War I
- Awards: Croix de Guerre (France); Legion of Honor (Officer) (France); Order of Saints Maurice and Lazarus (Commander) (Italy)

Evan M. Johnson (September 26, 1861 – October 14, 1923) was a career officer in the United States Army. A veteran of the Apache Wars, Spanish–American War, Philippine–American War, occupation of Veracruz, and World War I, he was most notable for his First World War command of the 154th Infantry Brigade, 158th Infantry Brigade, 77th Division, and 79th Division.

== Early life ==
Evan Malbone Johnson was born in Brooklyn, New York on September 26, 1861, a son of Evan M. Johnson (1833–1915) and Amy (Grant) Johnson (1843–1872). Johnson's father was a Union Army veteran of the American Civil War, and attained the rank of captain in the 23rd New York Infantry Regiment before winning election to the post of Brooklyn city controller. Johnson's grandfather was prominent clergyman Evan Malbone Johnson, who was often referred to as "Dominie" Johnson. Despite being the third in his family to carry the name, Johnson was frequently called Evan Malbone Johnson Jr. to distinguish him from his father and grandfather. Johnson attended the public schools of Brooklyn and graduated from the city's Juvenile High School. He then attended the Alexander Military Academy in White Plains, New York and Brooklyn Polytechnic Institute.

== Start of career ==
Having decided on a military career, in December 1882 Johnson enlisted in the United States Army. He joined under an assumed name, using grand-uncle James Scarlett's name as an alias. Joining Company F, 10th Infantry Regiment as a private, Johnson had advanced to sergeant by January 1885.

Under his own name, in August 1885, Johnson passed the examination for a commission, was appointed a second lieutenant of Infantry, and was assigned to the 10th Infantry. In 1889, he graduated from the Infantry and Cavalry School at Fort Leavenworth, Kansas. From 1891 to 1894, he served as professor of military science at Mount Union College. In 1892, he was promoted to first lieutenant and assigned to the 19th Infantry. When Johnson left Mount Union in 1894, the college awarded him the honorary degree of Master of Science. In 1895, Johnson took part in Apache Wars expeditions in Arizona and New Mexico. In July 1895, he was appointed regimental quartermaster.

== Continued career ==
In 1898, the 19th Infantry mobilized for overseas duty during the Spanish–American War, and Johnson took part in combat in Puerto Rico. He later served as military governor of Adjuntas province. In March 1899, he was promoted to captain.

Johnson was promoted to temporary major in July 1899. He joined the 29th Infantry, which served in the Philippines during the Philippine–American War. As commander of the regiment's 3rd Battalion, he took part in combat in La Union, Benguet, and Laguna. Johnson later led an expedition against Filipino insurgents on Tablas Island. From March to October 1901, he served as governor of Romblon province.

In 1905, Johnson was a member of the 8th Infantry when his article "The Enlisted Man's Contract With the Government" was published in the Journal of the Military Service Institution of the United States. Johnson's article was well-received and won the Silver Medal in the organization's annual awards program for original authorship of articles on military topics. From 1906 to 1908 he served with the 8th Infantry in the Philippines. In 1908 he was promoted to major and assigned to the 6th Infantry.

In 1910, Johnson was assigned as a student at the United States Army War College, from which he graduated in 1911. After graduation, Johnson was assigned as instructor and advisor for the New Jersey National Guard. In late 1912, Johnson was assigned to staff duty in the Army's Militia Affairs Bureau. From 1912 to 1914, Johnson served as secretary of the United States Infantry Association and editor of the Infantry Journal. In 1913, he was an instructor and advisor for the Pennsylvania National Guard during its annual summer training, and later that summer he performed similar duty in New Jersey.

In 1914, Johnson took part in the United States occupation of Veracruz as commander of the 19th Infantry Regiment, and he remained in Mexico until the U.S. withdrawal in November. In June 1914, Pennsylvania Military College awarded Johnson the honorary degree of master of military science. In August, he was promoted to lieutenant colonel.

== World War I ==
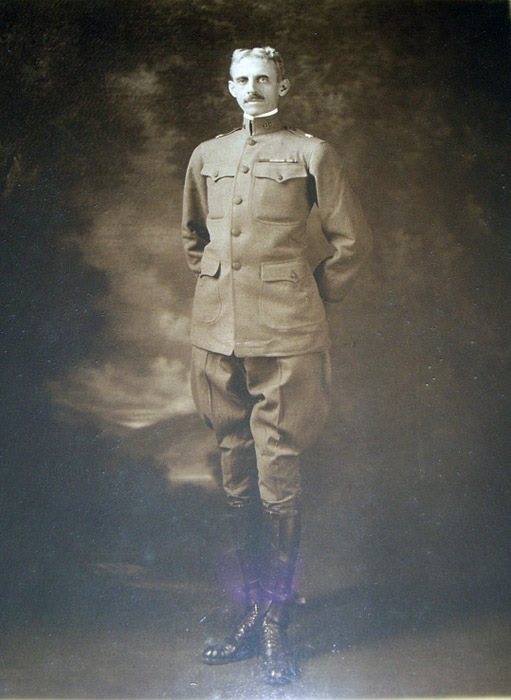
Johnson with the 77th Division at Camp Upton, New York in 1917

In July 1916, Johnson was promoted to colonel as commander of the 5th Infantry Regiment. He led his regiment during preparations and training that anticipated U.S. entry into World War I. In 1916, he was assigned to duty in Panama as commander of the 29th Infantry Regiment.

In August 1917, he was promoted to brigadier general and assigned to command the 154th Infantry Brigade, a unit of the 77th Division. Johnson took part in the division's combat in France and served as acting division commander on several occasions. When the Lost Battalion commanded by Charles W. Whittlesey became isolated in October 1918, Johnson personally led an attack that attempted to relieve Whittlesey, and was wounded in the battle.

In June 1918, Mount Union College conferred on Johnson the honorary degree of LL.D. In late October 1918, Johnson was assigned to command the 158th Infantry Brigade, a unit of the 79th Division. He remained in command until the end of the war, and also acted as division commander on several occasions.

== Later career ==
In 1919, Johnson returned to his permanent rank of colonel and was assigned as U.S. military attaché in Rome. He continued to serve until 1922, when he requested retirement. Johnson was fluent in Italian, one reason why he was highly regarded by the Italian government.

== Awards ==
Johnson's awards and decorations included the French Croix de Guerre to recognize his combat experience in World War I. In addition, he was awarded the French Legion of Honor (Officer) to recognize his wartime service. Johnson was also awarded the Italian Order of Saints Maurice and Lazarus (Commander) in recognition of the service he rendered while stationed in Rome.

== Retirement and death ==
Johnson was active in the Military Order of the Loyal Legion of the United States as a result of his father's Civil War service. In addition, he was active in the Sons of the American Revolution, Hereditary Order of Descendants of Colonial Governors, and the Alpha Tau Omega fraternity. He was active in the Freemasons, and attained the 32nd degree of the Scottish Rite.

Johnson died in Paris on October 14, 1923, as the result of complications while undergoing surgery. He was buried at Suresnes American Cemetery and Memorial in Suresnes, France. In 1930, the U.S. Congress passed legislation allowing the general officers of World War I to retire at the highest rank they had held, and Johnson's brigadier general rank was posthumously restored.

== Family ==
In 1896, Johnson married Bessie Seaman in Sault Ste. Marie, Michigan. They divorced in March 1915, and in July Mrs. Johnson married Army officer William M. Morrow. The Johnsons were the parents of three children – Elizabeth, Cornelia, and Evan.
