= Robert Houston Noble =

U.S. Army brigadier general

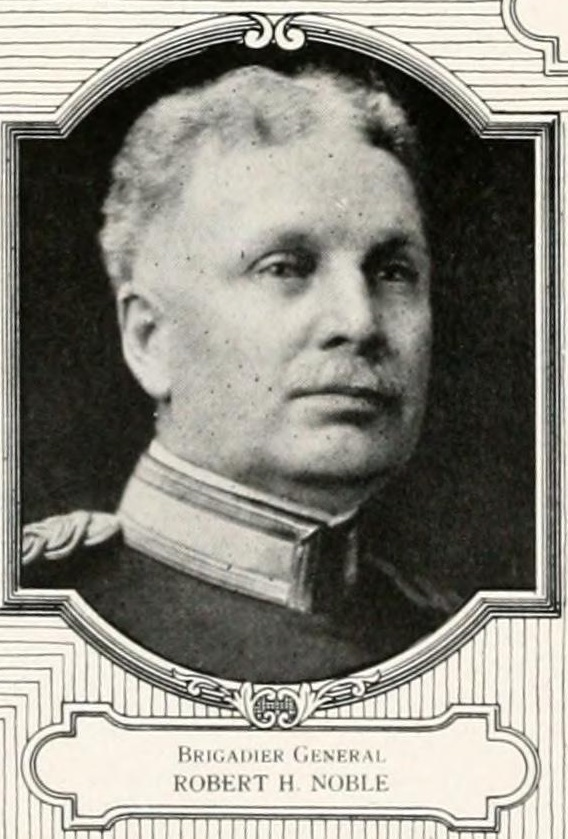
- From 1920's The Official History of the 315th Infantry U.S.A.
- Born: November 3, 1861; Federalsburg, Maryland, U.S.
- Died: October 26, 1939 (aged 77); San Francisco, California U.S.
- Burial place: Cypress Lawn Memorial Park, Colma, California
- Alma mater: United States Military Academy; University of Maryland School of Law
- Spouse: Ethel Elizabeth (Dimond) Sherwood (m. 1921-1939, his death)
- Military career
- Allegiance: United States
- Branch: United States Army
- Service years: 1884–1922
- Rank: Brigadier General
- Unit: U.S. Army Infantry Branch
- Commands: Company D, 1st Infantry Regiment; Company B, 1st Infantry; Company H, 1st Infantry; 3rd Battalion, 1st Infantry; 22nd Infantry Regiment; 6th Infantry Regiment; 30th Division; 158th Infantry Brigade; Monte Carlo Leave Area
- Conflicts: Apache Wars; Spanish–American War; Philippine–American War; Pancho Villa Expedition; World War I
- Awards: Silver Star

Robert Houston Noble (November 3, 1861 – October 26, 1939) was a career officer in the United States Army. A veteran of the Apache Wars, Spanish–American War, Philippine–American War, Pancho Villa Expedition, and World War I, he attained the rank of brigadier general and was most notable for his World War I command of the 158th Infantry Brigade.

== Early life ==
Robert H. Noble was born in Federalsburg, Maryland on November 3, 1861, a son of Dr. William A. Noble and Mary A. (Houston) Noble. He attended the public schools of Carroll County and the State Model School in Trenton, New Jersey. In 1880, he began attendance at the United States Military Academy, and he graduated in 1884 ranked 32 of 37.

== Start of career ==
After graduation, Noble received his commission as a second lieutenant in the 1st Infantry Regiment and was posted to Fort Bowie and Fort Lowell, Arizona. In 1885 and 1886, he took part in the expedition to capture Geronimo during the Apache Wars. In July 1886, his regiment was transferred to California, and Noble served first at Angel Island, and later at Benicia Barracks.

In September 1890, Noble was assigned as professor of military science at St. John's College in Annapolis, Maryland. While serving at St. John's, Noble received an LL.B. degree from the University of Maryland School of Law in 1892 and the honorary degree of Master of Arts from St. John's in 1894. Noble was admitted to the bar after completing his legal education, but he opted to continue his military career.

Noble rejoined the 1st Infantry in November 1894, and served at Angel Island, Benicia Barracks and in San Diego as commander of Companies D, B, and H, then became the regimental adjutant at the Presidio of San Francisco. In April 1897 he was appointed aide-de-camp to William Rufus Shafter, then commander of the Department of California.

== Spanish–American War ==
When Shafter was named to command the Fifth Army Corps during the Spanish–American War in 1898, Noble continued to serve with Shafter. During the war, Noble took part in combat in and around Santiago, and on four occasions he was selected to enter Spanish lines and conduct negotiations under a flag of truce.

After the Spanish surrender, the Fifth Corps was stationed at Montauk and Governors Island. Noble continued to serve as Shafter's aide and assisted in the preparation of the corps' official report of its wartime activities.

== Philippine–American War ==
In January 1899, Noble joined the headquarters staff of the Department of California in San Francisco. He served successively as the department's judge advocate, inspector of small arms, and inspector general.

Noble was posted to the Philippines in September 1899. He served as adjutant of 2d Brigade, 1st Division, Eighth Corps, which was commanded by Frederick Dent Grant, followed by assignment as adjutant of the Department of the Visayas, which was commanded by Robert Patterson Hughes. He next served as adjutant for U.S. troops in Cebu during the military governorship of Simon Snyder. He then served as adjutant of the Department of South Philippines under the command of Edward Settle Godfrey and then served again as adjutant of the Department of the Visayas, which was commanded by Frank Baldwin.

During his service in the Philippines, Noble took part in campaigns in Luzon, Panay, and Samar. In addition, while serving as adjutant in Visayas, Noble accepted the surrender of several Filipino insurgents as Hughes' representative.

== Continued career ==
Noble continued to serve in the Philippines. From October 1902 to February 1908 he served as military aide to the Governor-General of the Philippines, a period which included the governorships of William Howard Taft, Luke Edward Wright, Henry Clay Ide, and James Francis Smith. When Taft led a U.S. goodwill mission to Japan in 1905, Noble accompanied him as the representative of the Philippine government. Noble performed a similar duty when Taft led missions to Hong Kong in 1907. When Leonard Wood left the Philippines in early 1908 following his command of the Philippine Division, Noble was assigned as his aide on Wood's extended voyage to the United States, which included an observation tour of military site and units in Singapore, Ceylon, Aden, Egypt, Malta, and several European countries.

In June 1908, Noble rejoined the 1st Infantry Regiment at Vancouver Barracks, Washington and assumed command of the regiment's 3rd Battalion. He served with the 1st Infantry until December 1910, and his responsibilities included an inspection tour of Army sites in Alaska. From January to August 1911, Noble was a student at the Fort Leavenworth, Kansas Field Officers Course (now the United States Army Command and General Staff College. From August 1911 to August 1912, he was a student at the United States Army War College.

In the fall of 1912, Noble was assigned to temporary duty as an umpire during war games held in Hawaii. In December 1912, he was assigned to the 12th Infantry at the Presidio of Monterey, California. In February 1913, he was promoted to lieutenant colonel and assigned detached duty in San Francisco as supervisor of National Guard affairs for the Western Department. From August 1914 to October 1916, Noble commanded the 22nd Infantry Regiment, which was based in Texas City, Texas while patrolling the U.S.-Mexico border, and later based in Arizona. Noble was promoted to colonel in July 1916.

In November 1916, Noble assumed command of the 6th Infantry Regiment, which was stationed in Chihuahua, Mexico during the Pancho Villa Expedition. He continued in command after the regiment left Mexico for Fort Bliss, Texas, and then led it to Chickamauga, Georgia where it took part in increased training to prepare for U.S. entry into World War I.

== World War I ==
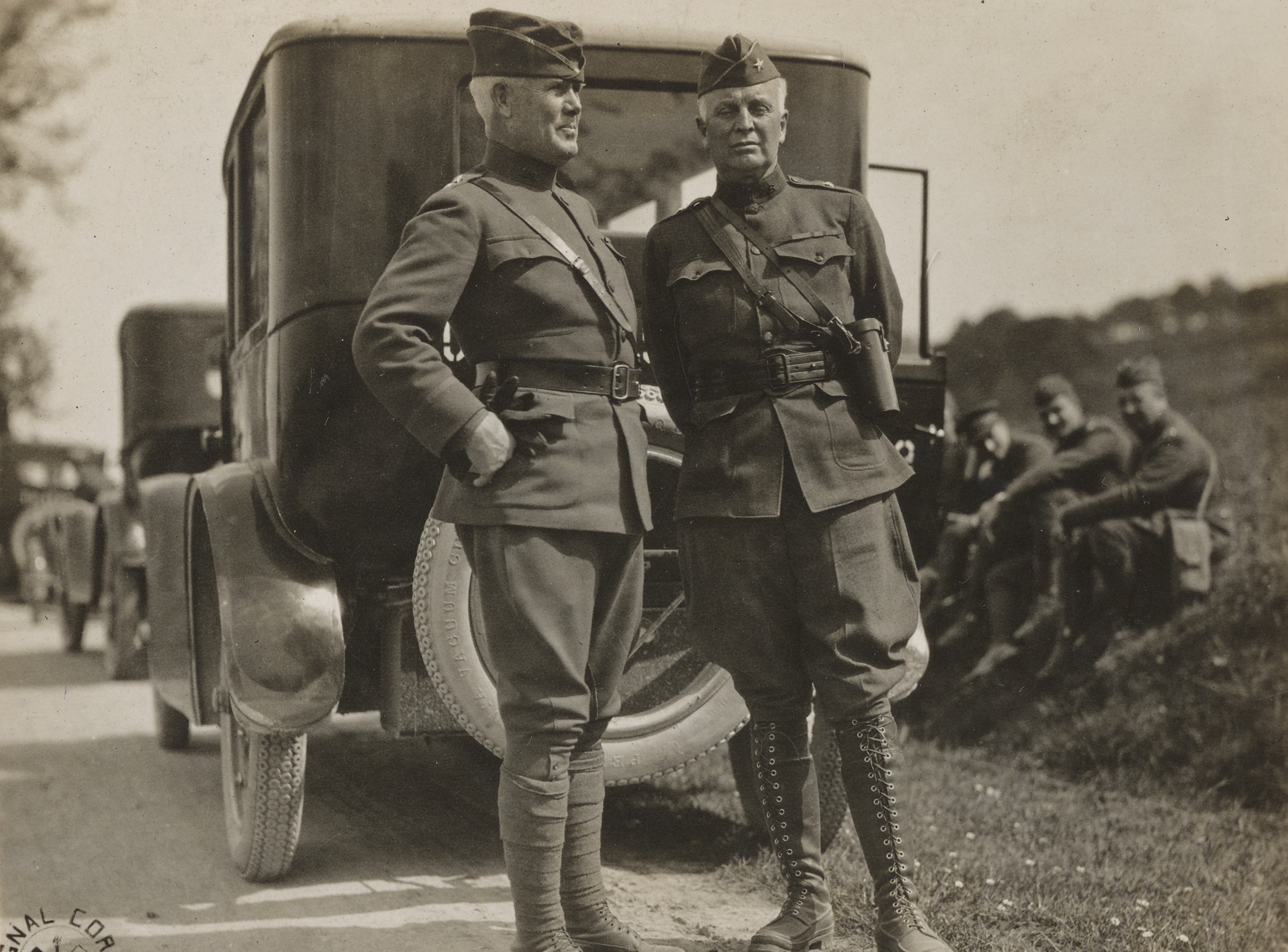
Major General George B. Duncan (left), commanding the 77th Division, in conversation with Brigadier General Robert H. Noble at Zouaf, France, May 14, 1918.

Now forming part of the 5th Division, the 6th Infantry arrived in France as part of the American Expeditionary Forces (AEF) in March 1918, eleven months after the American entry into the war. The next month, Noble was promoted to brigadier general and he served with the 30th and 77th Divisions, including several days as acting commander of the 30th Division. After observing British units on the front near Albert and Béthune, he served with the 77th Division as an observer in the Baccarat sector during the Aisne-Marne Offensive in July-August.

In August, Noble was assigned to command the 158th Infantry Brigade, a unit of the 79th Division, commanded by Major General Joseph E. Kuhn. He led his brigade during the start of the Franco-American Meuse–Argonne offensive in late September, but was relieved after just a few days because his division commander, Major General Kuhn, together with the inspector general of the AEF, Major General Andre W. Brewster, who was also a Medal of Honor recipient, were dissatisfied with his performance. Noble was then assigned to staff duty with the AEF Services of Supply.

Following the armistice with Germany on November 11, 1918, which finally brought an end to the war, Noble reverted to his permanent rank of colonel, and he was placed in command of the AEF's Monte Carlo Leave Area until February 1919.

== Later career ==
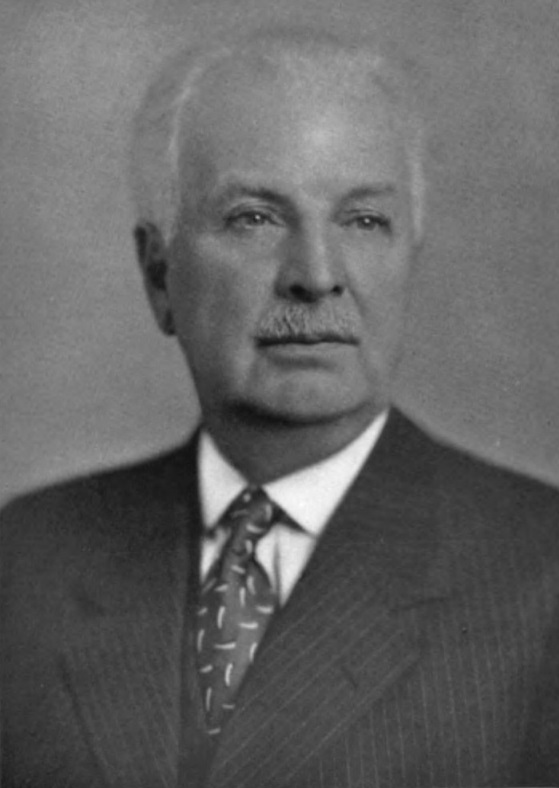
Noble in retirement in the 1930s

In March 1919, Noble returned to the United States and was assigned as head of National Guard affairs for the Ninth Corps Area in San Francisco. He continued to serve in this position until he retired in December 1922.

After his retirement, Noble was awarded the Silver Star to recognize his heroism at the Siege of Santiago during the Spanish–American War. In 1930, the U.S. Congress passed legislation enabling World War I general officers to retire at their highest wartime rank, and Noble was promoted to brigadier general on the Army's retired list.

== Retirement and death ==
In retirement, Noble was a resident of San Francisco. He was active in the affairs of the Episcopal church, and was a member of several church-related committees and delegate to several church conventions. He was also active in the Society of Indian Wars, Veterans of the Philippines, and Military Order of Foreign Wars. In addition, Noble also became involved in the activities of the California Bar Association and American Bar Association, and also served on the board of directors of the San Francisco chapter of the American Red Cross.

Noble was fluent in Spanish and French, and also composed church music, and in retirement he devoted time to improving these skills. He died in San Francisco on October 26, 1939. Noble was buried at Cypress Lawn Memorial Park in Colma, California.

== Family ==
In 1921, Noble married Ethel Elizabeth (Dimond) Sherwood, a widow. She was the mother of two children, William R. Sherwood II and Beth Sherwood.

== Dates of rank ==
Noble's effective dates of rank were:

- Second lieutenant, June 15, 1884
- First lieutenant, June 15, 1891
- Major (temporary), June 20, 1898
- Captain, October 12, 1898
- Major (temporary), September 5, 1899
- Captain, June 30, 1901
- Major, October 4, 1907
- Lieutenant colonel, February 1, 1913
- Colonel, July 1, 1916
- Brigadier general (temporary), April 12, 1918
- Colonel, November 12, 1918
- Colonel (Retired), December 12, 1922
- Brigadier general (Retired list), June 21, 1930

== Sources ==
=== Books ===
- Cullum, George Washington (1901). Holden, Edward S. (ed.). Biographical Register of the Officers and Graduates of the U.S. Military Academy. Vol. Supplement IV. Cambridge, MA: Riverside Press – via Google Books.
- Cullum, George Washington (1910). Braden, Charles (ed.). Biographical Register of the Officers and Graduates of the U.S. Military Academy. Vol. Supplement, Volume V. Saginaw, MI: Seemann & Peters – via Google Books.
- Cullum, George Washington (1920). Robinson, Wirt (ed.). Biographical Register of the Officers and Graduates of the U.S. Military Academy. Vol. Supplement, Volume VI-A. Saginaw, MI: Seemann & Peters – via Google Books.
- Davis, Henry Blaine Jr. (1998). Generals in Khaki. Raleigh, NC: Pentland Press. ISBN 978-1-5719-7088-6 – via Google Books.
- Downs, Winfield Scott, ed. (1941). "Noble, Robert Houston". Encyclopedia of American Biography. N.S. Vol. 12. New York, NY: American Historical Company. pp. 372–375 – via HathiTrust.
- St. John's College (1898). Catalogue of St. John's College, Annapolis, Maryland. Annapolis, MD: Maryland Republican Steam Press – via Google Books.

=== Magazines ===
- Nenninger, Timothy K. (Spring 2005). "John J. Pershing and Relief for Cause in the American Expeditionary Forces, 1917-1918" (PDF). Army History. Washington, DC: U.S. Army Center of Military History. Archived from the original (PDF) on June 8, 2010.

=== Newspapers ===
- "Robert H. Noble, Wm. F. Watson and O. F. Hershey". The Baltimore Sun. Baltimore, MD. June 29, 1892 – via Newspapers.com.
- "Funeral Rites Held for Retired General". Oakland Tribune. Oakland, CA. October 28, 1939. p. 17 – via NewspaperArchive.com.
