= Andre W. Brewster =

United States Army general and Medal of Honor recipient

Andre Brewster
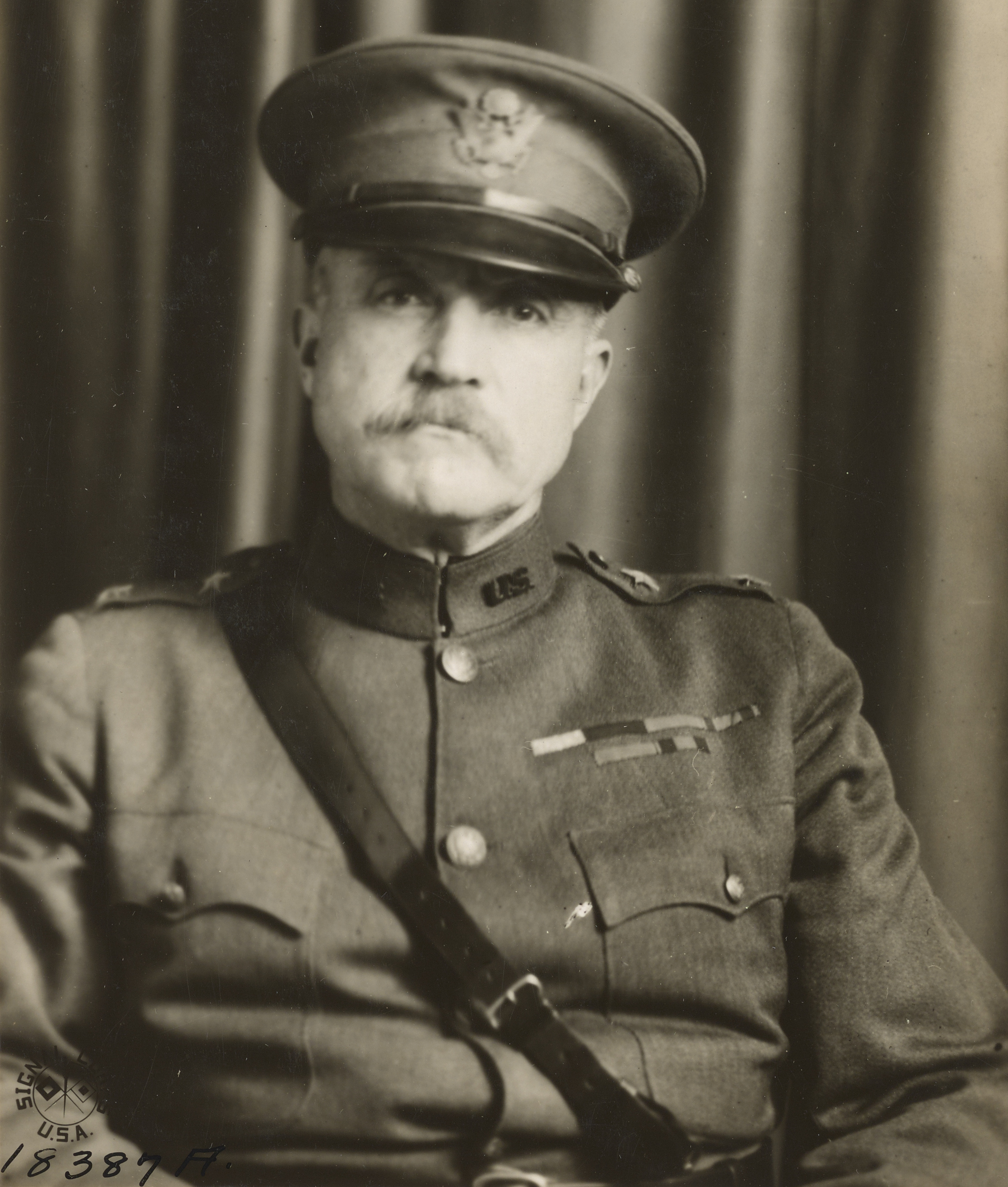
- Born: December 9, 1862; Hoboken, New Jersey, U.S.
- Died: March 27, 1942 (aged 79); Boston, Massachusetts, U.S.
- Burial place: Arlington National Cemetery, Virginia, United States
- Military career
- Allegiance: United States
- Branch: United States Army
- Service years: 1885–1925
- Rank: Major General
- Service number: 0-13386
- Unit: Infantry Branch
- Commands: 65th Infantry Regiment; Inspector General of the United States Army; Second Coast Artillery District; First Corps Area
- Conflicts: American Indian Wars; Spanish–American War: Siege of Santiago; Battle of San Juan Hill; Philippine–American War; Boxer Rebellion: Battle of Tientsin; World War I
- Awards: Medal of Honor; Army Distinguished Service Medal

Major General Andre Walker Brewster (December 9, 1862 – March 27, 1942) was a United States Army officer and a recipient of the Medal of Honor. He served in several high-profile assignments throughout his long military career, including Inspector General of the United States Army and Inspector General of the American Expeditionary Forces (AEF) in France during World War I. In addition, he was a veteran of the American Indian Wars, the Spanish–American War, the Philippine–American War, and Boxer Rebellion. He received the Medal of Honor for his role in the Battle of Tientsin during the Boxer Rebellion.

== Early life ==
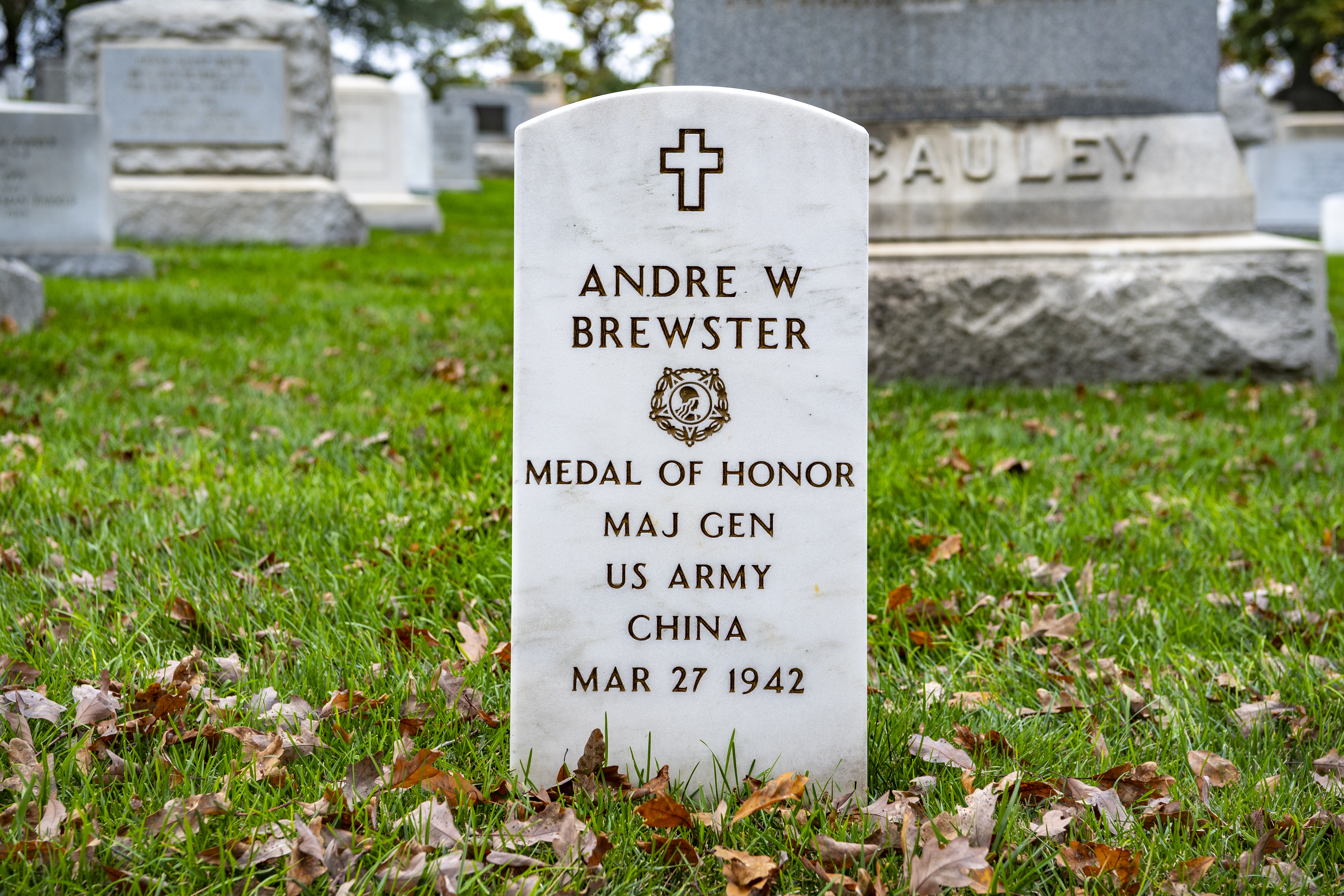
Grave at Arlington National Cemetery

Andre Walker Brewster was born on December 9, 1862, in Hoboken, New Jersey. His mother was Mary Bache Walker (1839–1876), great-great-great-granddaughter of Benjamin Franklin, daughter of Robert J. Walker, and sister of Duncan Stephen Walker. His father was Adrien Deslondes (also spelled Deslonde or Deslandes, etc.), a midshipman in the United States Navy whose family owned sugar plantations in Louisiana.

Adrien Deslondes and Mary Walker divorced in the mid-1860s. In 1870, Mary Walker married Benjamin H. Brewster, who adopted Andre Walker Deslondes and his siblings. Andre Brewster was raised and educated in Philadelphia and Washington, D.C. He was trained as an attorney and practiced for three years before joining the Army. (Note: The Inspectors General of the United States Army, 1903–1939 indicates that Brewster attended the University of Pennsylvania, but this is not validated by other references.)

== Start of career ==
In January 1885, Brewster received a direct commission as a second lieutenant in the 10th Infantry Regiment, a post which had also been sought by David L. Brainard. (Note: In 1886, Brainard received his commission as a second lieutenant in the 2nd Cavalry Regiment.) He served on frontier duty, including campaigns against the Apache and Sioux during the American Indian Wars.

During the Spanish–American War, Brewster commanded Company B, 9th Infantry. He took part in the Siege of Santiago and the Battle of San Juan Hill. He was recommended for brevet promotion to captain for his conduct at San Juan Hill. Following his service in Cuba, Brewster continued to command Company B during the Philippine Insurrection.

== Medal of Honor action ==
For his actions during the Boxer Rebellion on July 13, 1900, in Tianjin, China, Brewster was awarded the Medal of Honor.

=== Medal of Honor citation ===
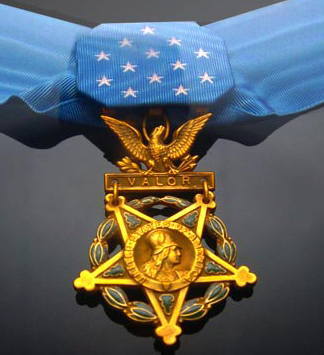

Andre W. Brewster
Rank and organization: Captain, 9th U.S. Infantry
Place and date: At Tianjin, China, July 13, 1900.
Entered service at: Philadelphia, Pa.
Born: December 9, 1862 Hoboken, N.J.
Date of issue: September 15, 1903.

Citation:

The President of the United States of America, in the name of Congress, takes pleasure in presenting the Medal of Honor to Captain (Infantry) Andre Walker Brewster, United States Army, for gallantry in action on 13 July 1900, while serving with the 9th Infantry at Tientsin, China. While under fire Captain Brewster rescued two of his men from drowning.

== Continued career ==
Brewster remained in China for five years as the U.S. military attaché. He then attended the Army War College, from which he graduated in 1907. In early 1909, he was appointed acting inspector general of the Army. The appointment was confirmed in December, and he held the post until 1913.

In 1914, Brewster was assigned to Puerto Rico as commander of the 65th Infantry Regiment. He then returned to the inspector general's post, where he remained until 1917.

== World War I ==
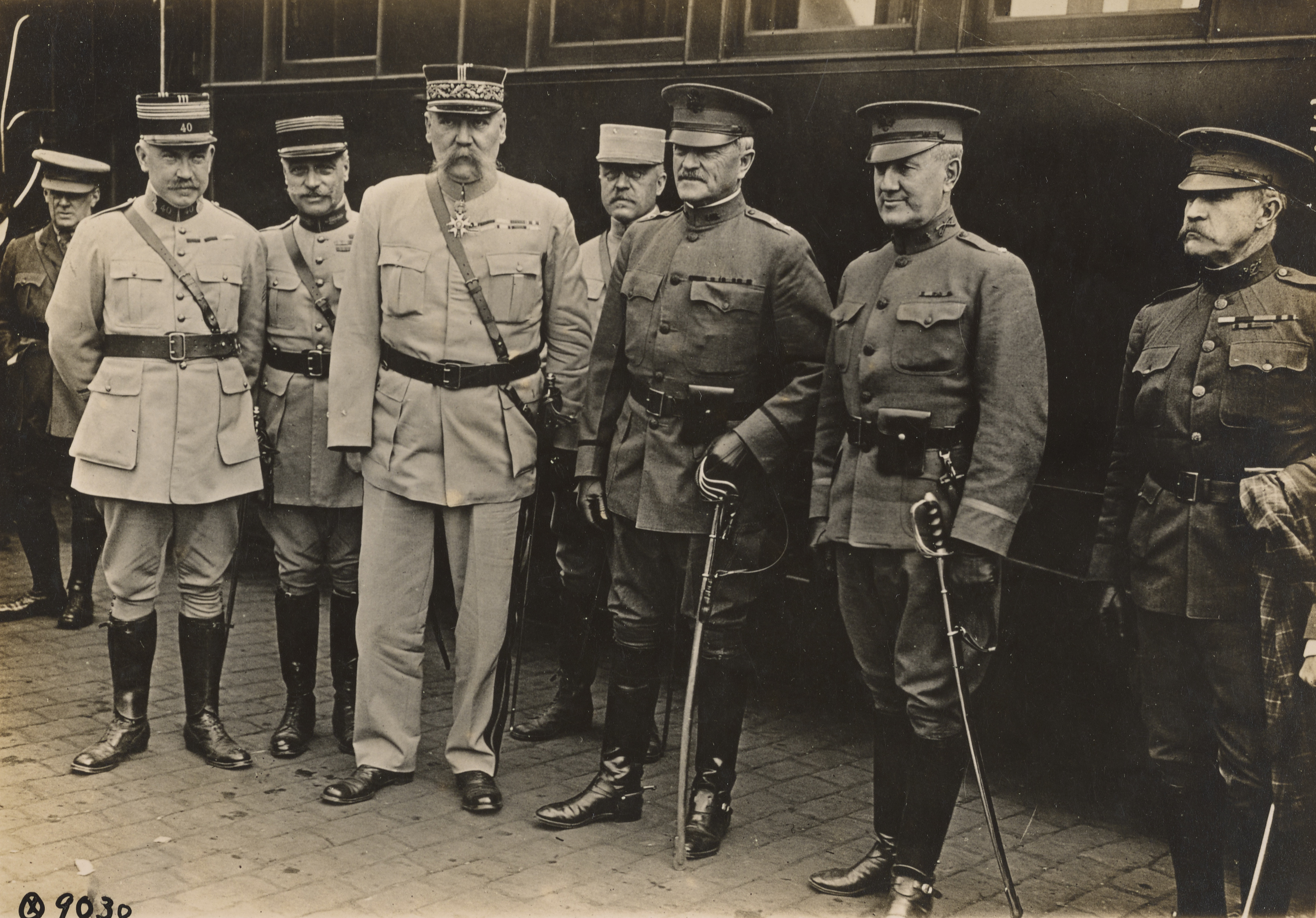
Arrival in France of Major General Pershing and Lieutenant Colonel James Harbord, with General Peter Peltier of the French Army stood to Pershing's right, France, June 13, 1917. To Harbord's left is Colonel Brewster.

During World War I, from June 1917 to September 1919, Brewster served in France as inspector general of general headquarters (GHQ) of the American Expeditionary Forces (AEF). Major General John J. Pershing, the AEF's commander-in-chief, promoted to full general in October 1917, valued Brewster's judgment, especially with respect to evaluating the performance of many of the AEF's brigade and division commanders.

When Brewster assessed the combat performance of Brigadier General Robert H. Noble, commander of the 158th Infantry Brigade, 79th Division, as ineffective, Pershing relieved Noble. Brewster's negative assessment of Major General Omar Bundy's performance as commander of the 2nd Division was a key factor in his removal from command and transfer to command of the skeletal U.S. VI Corps. His positive appraisal of Major General Robert Lee Bullard's performance was a major factor in Pershing's decision to recommend Bullard for promotion to lieutenant general and assignment as commander of the Second Army. Pershing also had a less than favorable view of Major General Clarence R. "Daddy" Edwards, the popular commander of the 26th Division, and Brewster's lengthy assessment of Edwards as a subpar performer played a role in Pershing's decision to relieve Edwards.

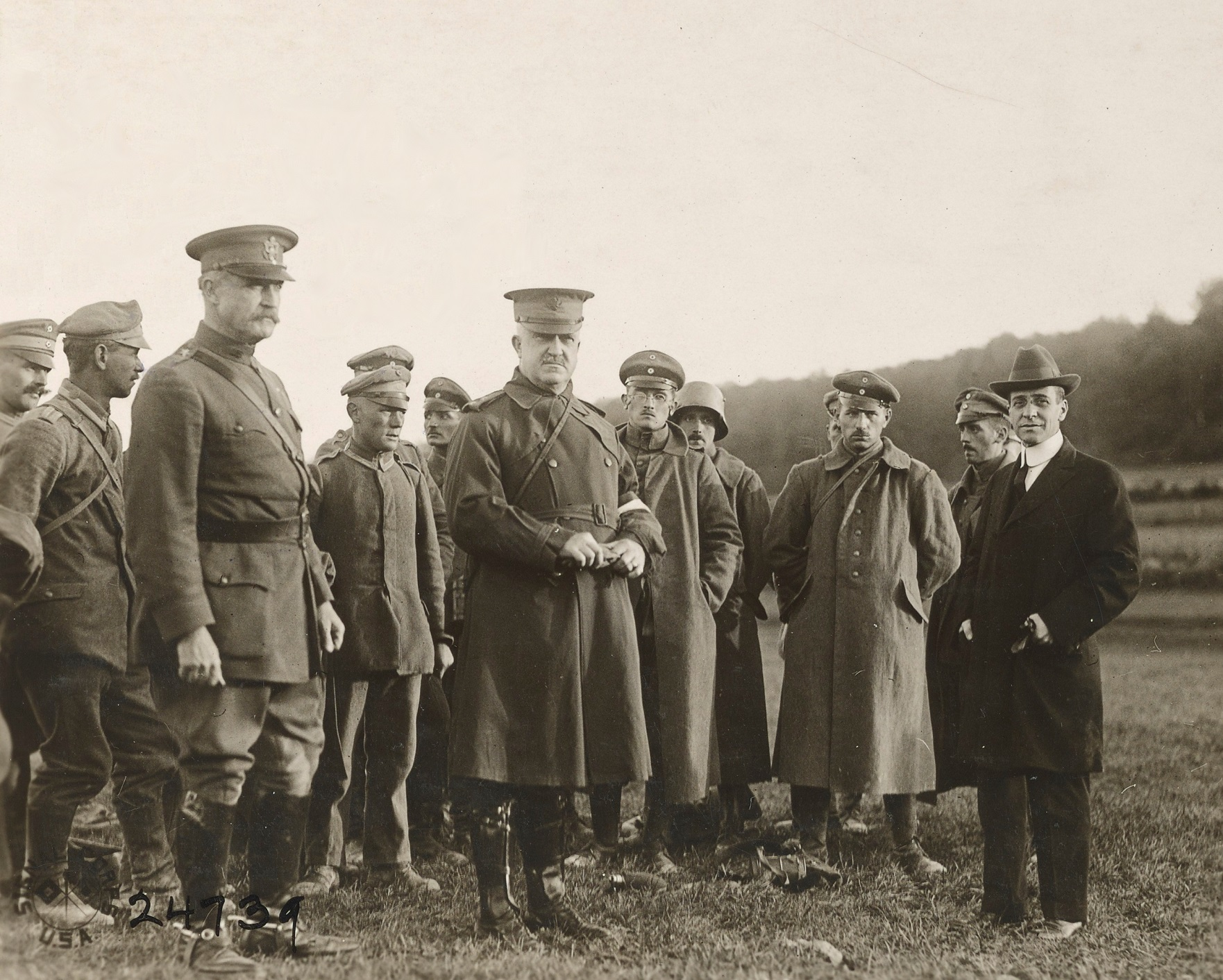
Secretary of War Newton D. Baker (right), Major General James W. McAndrew (center), Pershing's chief of staff, and Major General Brewster (left) with a group of German prisoners who have just arrived from the front, September 26, 1918.

=== Army Distinguished Service Medal citation ===
Citation:

The President of the United States of America, authorized by Act of Congress, July 9, 1918, takes pleasure in presenting the Distinguished Service Medal to Major General Andre Walker Brewster, United States Army, for exceptionally meritorious and distinguished services to the Government of the United States, in a duty of great responsibility during World War I. General Brewster organized and administered with marked ability the Inspector General's Department of the American Expeditionary Forces, and his soldierly characteristics and unceasing labors influenced greatly the attainment of efficiency in the American Army in France.

War Department, General Orders No. 12 (1919)

== Later career ==
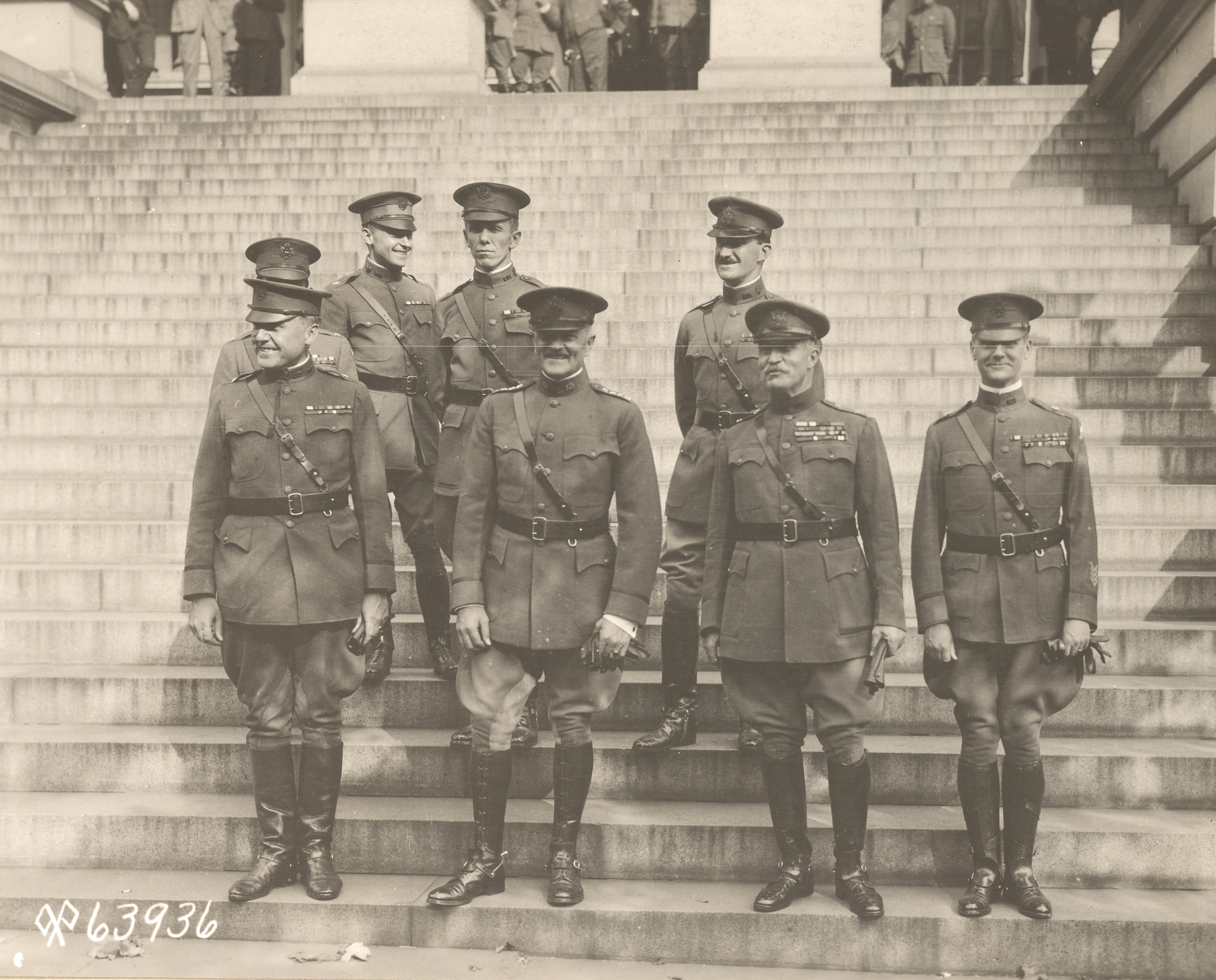
General of the Armies John J. Pershing and members of his staff standing outside the State, War, and Navy Building in Washington, D.C., September 23, 1919. Stood to Pershing's left is Major General Andre W. Brewster.

From 1921 to 1922, Brewster commanded the Second Coast Artillery District, headquartered at Fort Totten, New York. (Note: The biography for Brewster in Pershing's My Life Before the World War indicates that Brewster commanded the 5th Division, but this is not confirmed by any other sources.) Brewster's final command was the First Corps Area in Boston, Massachusetts, where he succeeded Brigadier General Mark L. Hersey. He retired in 1925 with the rank of major general.

== Death and burial ==
Brewster died in Boston on March 27, 1942. He was buried at Arlington National Cemetery.

== Family ==
In 1885, Brewster married Elizabeth Griffin (1862–1948). They were the parents of a daughter, Mary Walker Brewster (1887–1979), the wife of James Donald Cassels.

== Namesakes ==
In World War II, the United States Navy transport ship General A. W. Brewster was named in Brewster's honor. The ship was also active in the Korean War, earning five battle stars for her service in that conflict.

== Honors and awards ==
Brewster's awards included:

1st row	Medal of Honor		
2nd row	Army Distinguished Service Medal	Indian Campaign Medal	Spanish Campaign Medal
3rd row	Army of Cuban Occupation Medal	China Campaign Medal	Philippine Campaign Medal
4th row	Mexican Border Service Medal	World War I Victory Medal	Legion of Honour (Commandeur) (France)
5th row	Order of Leopold (Commandeur) (Belgium)	Order of St Michael and St George (Knight Commander) (United Kingdom)	Military Order of the Dragon

== Dates of rank ==
- Second Lieutenant – 19 January 1885
- First Lieutenant – 17 December 1891
- Captain, Assistant Quartermaster, Volunteers – 15 October 1898
- Captain – 2 March 1899
- Discharged from Volunteers – 12 May 1899
- Major – 15 March 1908
- Lieutenant Colonel – 2 December 1913
- Colonel – 1 July 1916
- Brigadier General, National Army – 5 August 1917
- Major General, National Army – 28 November 1917
- Brigadier General, Regular Army – 8 January 1920
- Discharged from National Army – 28 February 1920
- Major General, Regular Army – 1 December 1922
- Major General, Retired List – 9 December 1925

== See also ==
- List of Medal of Honor recipients for the Boxer Rebellion
