= 1st Squadron, 1st Cavalry Regiment =

1st Squadron 1st Cavalry Regiment
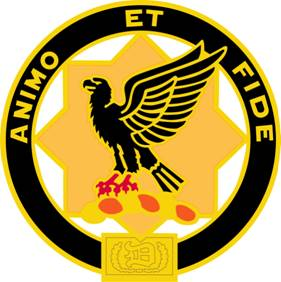
- Coat of arms
- Active: 1833–present
- Country: United States of America
- Branch: United States Army
- Type: Cavalry
- Mottos: Animo Et Fide ("Courageous and Faithful")
- Engagements: Mexican–American War; Indian Wars; American Civil War; Spanish–American War; Philippine–American War; World War II; Vietnam War; Gulf War; Battle of Medina Ridge; Bosnian War

The 1st Squadron, 1st Cavalry Regiment is the BCT cavalry squadron assigned to the 2nd Brigade Combat Team, 1st Armored Division. Carrying the lineage of Company A, United States Regiment of Dragoons, the squadron has served in the Mexican-American War, Civil War, various Indian wars, the Spanish–American War, the Philippine Insurrection, World War II, Vietnam, and the Global War on Terrorism.

== History ==
=== Early history ===
From 1833-1945, the 1st US Cavalry Regiment has distinguished itself across most of America's battlefields, including the Mexican-American War, Spanish–American War, the Philippine Insurrection, and World War II. The current 1st Squadron carries the lineage of the original Company A from the unit's constitution in 1833 through the implementation of the Combat Arms Regimental System in 1957. For more information on the early beginnings of the 1st Squadron's pre-history, see the 1st Cavalry Regiment.

=== Cold War; 1945–1954 ===
After World War II, the Regiment reorganized as the 1st Tank Battalion, was later converted to the 1st Constabulary Squadron, serving on occupation duty in Germany until December 1948, when it was inactivated. Reactivated as the 1st Medium Tank Battalion in March, 1951 at Fort Hood, Texas, the Regiment served with Combat Command A, 1st Armored Division, until February 1962 when the remainder of the 1st Armored Division was reactivated. At this time the Regiment was redesignated as the 1st Squadron, 1st Cavalry Regiment (or 1-1 Cavalry), and resumed its historic role as the "eyes and ears" of its parent organization.

During October, 1962, as a result of the Cuban Missile Crisis, the Squadron moved to Fort Stewart, Georgia with other elements of the 1st Armored Division. As the world situation eased, the Squadron participated in a STRAC (Strategic Army Corps) mobility exercise and amphibious training at Port Everglades, Florida. During the spring of 1963 the Squadron took part in the STRICOM (Simulation, Training & Instrumentation Command) exercise "Swift Strike," and then returned to Fort Hood.

=== Vietnam War ===
In January, 1967, the commander of 1st Squadron, 1st Cavalry Regiment, was called to Vietnam to assist in studying the role of Armor in Vietnam. Upon his return to Fort Hood, Texas in March, 1967, the Squadron began training for a deployment to Vietnam. From March to August 1967, the officers and men of the Squadron trained daily in all phases of Squad, Platoon, Troop and Squadron operations. The Squadron received superior ratings in their annual training test, annual general inspection, and Command Maintenance Management Inspections during this period. It surpassed every assigned mission with such professionalism, that in late July 1967, the Squadron was awarded the Third US Army Corps Superior Unit Award.

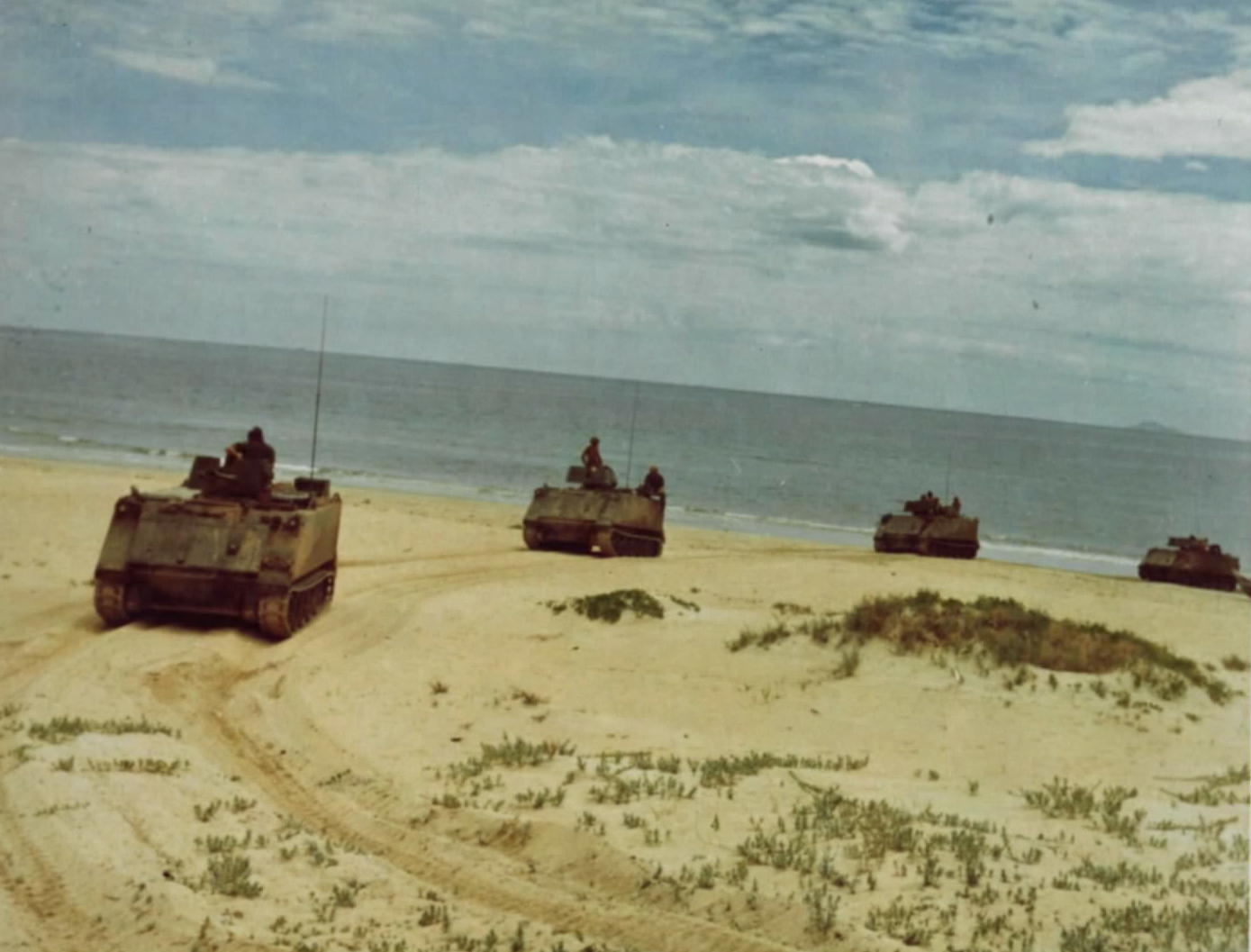
1st Squadron, 1st Cavalry along the coast of the South China Sea 1968

Arriving in Vietnam in August, 1967, the Squadron consisted of three Armored Cavalry Troops and one Air Cavalry Troop, D Troop, which was not deployed until July 1968. The Squadron immediately deployed in the I Corps Tactical Zone around the city of Chu Lai. It was committed to battle two days after its arrival, operating against the North Vietnamese Army and Vietcong. From 1 September 1967 to June 1968, the Squadron was involved in eleven major battles and numerous smaller engagements; among these were Cigar Island, Que Son Valley, Pineapple Forest, the Western Valley and Tam Ky. The Air Cavalry Troop, Troop D, joined the Squadron 21 July 1968, disembarking at Da Nang and flew directly to Camp Eagle. The Troop remained on combat duty in I CORP for the next four years using the call sign Sabre.

The Squadron was further augmented by Troop F, 8th Cavalry, attached to the Squadron as its "eyes and ears." In the Pineapple Forest Battle of February 1968, the ground-air cavalry team had its greatest victory, killing 180 of the enemy without losing one of its own number.

=== Gulf War ===
In February 1991, the Squadron spearheaded the 1st Armored Division's attack into Iraq during Operation Desert Storm. As the Division's best Cavalry Squadron, 1st Squadron, 1st Cavalry Regiment made first enemy contact with the Medina Division and informed the Division Commander of the location of the enemy forces. The subsequent battle, known as Medina Ridge, soon involved the Division's 2nd Brigade consisting of 1-35th Armor, 4-70th Armor, 2-70th Armor and 6-6th Infantry. Medina Ridge was one of the few battles during Desert Storm where American forces encountered significant Iraqi resistance. One of the largest tank battles of the war, the battle was a devastating loss for the Iraqi army, which lost hundreds of tanks, artillery, and infantry fighting vehicles to a mere four U.S. tanks and two M3A2 Bradleys (the latter of which belonged to 1st Squadron) destroyed. Following the Gulf War, 1st Squadron, 1st Cavalry Regiment returned with the Division to Germany where it remained until the Bosnian Conflict (1992-1995).

== Lineage ==
=== Decorations ===
- Presidential Unit Citation (Army), Streamer embroidered PLEIKU PROVINCE
- Presidential Unit Citation (Army), Streamer embroidered HOA HAI
- Presidential Unit Citation (Army), Streamer embroidered TAM KY-HOI AN
- Valorous Unit Award, Streamer embroidered QUANG TIN-QUANG NGAI
- Valorous Unit Award, Streamer Embroidered FISH HOOK
- Valorous Unit Award, Streamer Embroidered TAY NINH PROVINCE
- Valorous Unit Award, Streamer Embroidered IRAQ-KUWAIT
- French Croixe de Guerre with Palm, World War II, Streamer embroidered CENTRAL ITALY
- Republic of Vietnam Cross of Gallantry with Palm, Streamer embroidered VIETNAM 1965-1969
- Republic of Vietnam Cross of Gallantry with Palm, Streamer embroidered VIETNAM 1969-1970
- Republic of Vietnam Cross of Gallantry with Palm, Streamer embroidered VIETNAM 1970
- Republic of Vietnam Cross of Gallantry with Palm, Streamer embroidered VIETNAM 1970-1971
- Republic of Vietnam Cross of Gallantry with Palm, Streamer embroidered VIETNAM 1971-1972
- Republic of Vietnam Civil Action Honor Medal, First Class, Streamer embroidered VIETNAM 1969-1970

Headquarters Troop additionally entitled to:
- Republic of Vietnam Cross of Gallantry with Palm, Streamer embroidered VIETNAM 1971
Troop B additionally entitled to:
- Presidential Unit Citation (Army), Streamer embroidered QUANG NAM PROVINCE
Troop D additionally entitled to:
- Republic of Vietnam Civil Action Honor Medal, First Class, Streamer embroidered VIETNAM 1968-1969
