= 2nd Brigade Combat Team, 1st Armored Division =

One of three basic maneuver units of the 1st Armored Division, US Army

2nd Brigade Combat Team of the 1st Armored Division
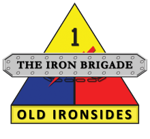
- Insignia of the 2nd Armored Brigade Combat Team, 1st Armored Division of the United States Army
- Country: USA
- Branch: Regular Army
- Type: Armored Brigade Combat Team
- Part of: 1st Armored Division
- Garrison/HQ: Fort Bliss
- Nickname: "Iron Brigade"
- Engagements: World War II; Operation Desert Storm; Operation Iraqi Freedom

The 2nd Brigade Combat Team, 1st Armored Division is an Armored Brigade Combat Team of the United States Army, stationed at Fort Bliss, TX. First organized in 1942, as Combat Command B, 1st Armored Division, the unit fought in North Africa and Italy in World War 2, in Operation Desert Storm and in Operation Iraqi Freedom. The brigade has been stationed at Fort Hood, TX and in Germany.

== History ==
=== World War II ===
First organized as Combat Command B in April 1942, the 2nd Brigade soldiers and their tanks were spearheaded into the action of World War II where they deployed as an integral part of the North African Invasion. After shedding blood during the landing at Algeria and the desert reaches of Bizente, Tunisia, and Kasserine Pass, the rookie unit forged itself into the decisive force that defeated Rommel's Afrika Corps. Following victory, the unit pushed north into Italy and fought as part of the US Fifth Army's primary strike force. The battles were bitter, with the opposed beachheads at Anzio, an unrelenting stalemate at Monte Cassino, and the tenacious defense of the Gothic Line.

=== Cold War ===
After the war, the unit's status changed several times over the course of the next 15 years. In 1962 it was re-designated as Headquarters and Headquarters Company, 2nd Brigade, 1st Armored Division and activated at Fort Hood, Texas. When America found itself amongst a Cold War, the brigade deployed during the Cuban Missile Crisis where it participated in amphibious exercises in Georgia to display the US' commitment, capability, and resolve. The exercises lasted nearly six weeks. Shortly thereafter, tensions eased and the unit returned to Fort Hood. For the next couple of decades the unit remained a key deterrent against the Communist Bloc threat. It was during this era, on 16 August 1985, the 2nd Brigade, 1st Armored Division became known as "The Iron Brigade" joining the legendary fighting spirit of certain Civil War units with the honor and service record of the distinguished 2nd Brigade.

=== Post-Cold War: Desert Storm and Peacekeeping ===
In more recent history, the 1991 conflict in the Persian Gulf arose and it was here during the blitz of Operation Desert Storm that the Iron Brigade faced the toughest of Iraqi forces. In 89 hours, 2nd Brigade's soldiers defeated the Iraqis at Al Busayyah, Al Rumaylah Airfield, and Medina ridge. As hostility operations ceased, the unit was then called upon to provide humanitarian aid to the war torn region. From 1995 to the early 2000s, 2/1 conducted missions in the Balkan Peninsula. These missions in Macedonia, Bosnia-Herzegovina, Albania, and Kosovo provided security and stability to their respective regions. It was during these missions that the Iron Brigade conducted successful peace keeping operations spanning the Central Region within the Balkan Peninsula.

=== War in Iraq 2003-2008 ===
After the 2003 United States invasion of Iraq, while deployed to the heavily guarded and mostly safe area of Baghdad International Airport, the 2d Brigade Combat Team saw 1st Brigade conduct combat during the ongoing insurgency. For 7 months in 2006, the brigade deployed to the streets of Kuwait conducting training. For the last 5 months of their "tour", the brigade was sent to Ramadi with enough time to unpack their conexes and then repack them before heading back home while 1st Brigade conducted combat operations.

In April 2008, the BCT returned to Iraq. The Brigade Headquarters and Headquarters Company conducted two reliefs in place assuming responsibility for the Mada’in Qada region. Its area of operations covered over 3700 square kilometers and a population of 1.2 million, an area that had previously been the responsibility of three full brigades. Throughout the duration of the deployment, it ensured all sustainment and operational support for over 4300 service members.

In 2010, the 5th Brigade, 1st Armored Division was inactivated. This unit had previously been designated as the Army's Evaluation Task Force. The Department of the Army redesignated the Army Capabilities Integration Center's Future Force Integration Directorate also known as AETF, to which 5th Brigade had been assigned, as the Brigade Modernization Command (BMC) in February 2011. As part of this change, the brigade was assigned the AETF mission and assigned to BMC.

== Current Organization ==
2nd Brigade Combat Team, 1st Armored Division is currently organized as an Armored Brigade Combat Team, composed of the following units:

- Headquarters and Headquarters Company (HHC), 2nd Brigade Combat Team (2nd BCT)
- 1st Squadron, 1st Cavalry Regiment
- 1st Battalion, 6th Infantry Regiment
- 1st Battalion 35th Armored Regiment
- 1st Battalion, 37th Armored Regiment
- 4th Battalion, 27th Field Artillery Regiment (4-27th FAR)
- 40th Brigade Engineer Battalion (40th BEB)
- 47th Brigade Support Battalion (47th BSB)

== Lineage and honors ==
=== Lineage ===
- Organized 1 January 1942 in the Regular Army at Fort Knox, Kentucky, as Headquarters and Headquarters Detachment, Combat Command B, 1st Armored Division
- Reorganized and redesignated 20 July 1944 as Headquarters and Headquarters Company, Combat Command B, 1st Armored Division
- Inactivated 9 April 1946 at Camp Kilmer, New Jersey
- Activated 7 March 1951 at Fort Hood, Texas
- Inactivated 23 December 1957 at Fort Polk, Louisiana
- Redesignated 3 February 1962 as Headquarters and Headquarters Company, 2d Brigade, 1st Armored Division, and activated at Fort Hood, Texas
- Headquarters, 2d Brigade, 1st Armored Division, reorganized and redesignated 16 September 2010 as Headquarters, 2d Brigade Combat Team, 1st Armored Division (Headquarters Company, 2d Brigade, 1st Armored Division – hereafter separate lineage)

=== Campaign participation credit ===
- World War II: Algeria-French Morocco (with arrowhead); Tunisia; Naples-Foggia; Anzio; Rome-Arno; North Apennines; Po Valley
- Southwest Asia: Defense of Saudi Arabia; Liberation and Defense of Kuwait; Cease-Fire
- War on Terrorism: Campaigns to be Determined

=== Decorations ===
- Presidential Unit Citation (United States) (Army), Streamer embroidered AL KUT AND AN NAJAF
- Valorous Unit Award, Streamer embroidered IRAQ 1991
- Meritorious Unit Commendation (Army), Streamer embroidered SOUTHWEST ASIA 2005–2006
- Meritorious Unit Commendation (Army), Streamer embroidered IRAQ 2008–2009
- Army Superior Unit Award, Streamer embroidered 1995–1996

== See also ==
- 1st Armored Division
