= John William Brewster =

British politician (1930–2019)

John Brewster OBE, CC (17 April 1930 – 30 September 2019) was elected in 1994 to the Court of Common Council as a member for the ward of Bassishaw, in the City of London. He was appointed President of Smithfield Market in 2013.

In October 2007 he was named in the Evening Standard’s London's 1,000 most influential people for his role as the Chairman of the City of London's Port Health and Environmental Services Committee. This committee is responsible for enforcing a wide range of environmental health controls along the tidal Thames, the Thames Estuary, the lower reaches of the River Medway and at the major ports of Tilbury, Thamesport and Sheerness.

Brewster was born near Paris, France, and was educated at St. George's College, Buenos Aires, Argentina. He is a past Master of the Worshipful Company of Butchers.
