= William Brewster =

William Brewster may refer to:

- William Brewster (Mayflower passenger) (1560–1644), English official and Mayflower passenger in 1620
- William Brewster (ornithologist) (1851–1919), American ornithologist
- William Brewster (priest) (died 1465), Canon of Windsor
- William E. Brewster (1858–1945), American banker, merchant, and politician from Maine
- William N. Brewster (1864–1917), American Protestant Christian missionary to China
- William R. Brewster (1828–1869), American Civil War general
- Willie Brewster (died 1965), whose murder was the first time in the history of Alabama that a white man was convicted of killing a black man
- Bill Brewster (American politician) (1941–2022), American politician
- Bill Brewster (Canadian politician) (1924–2014), Canadian politician
- Bill Brewster (DJ), disc jockey and author of Last Night a DJ Saved My Life
