= Murray Brewster =

Canadian journalist

- Education: Niagara College (1985)
- Occupations: Journalist; defence writer
- Employer: CBC News
- Awards: Atlantic Journalism Award (2); Ross Munro Award; King Charles III Coronation Medal
- Website: murraybrewster.com

Murray Brewster is a Canadian journalist who is a senior defence writer for CBC News. Based in Ottawa, his career in journalism spans over 30 years. He is the author of the 2011 book The Savage War: The Untold Battles of Afghanistan, recounting Canada's role in the war in Afghanistan.

== Biography ==
Murray Brewster spent his early years in Welland, Ontario, and attended the Centennial Secondary School. He graduated from Niagara College's radio, television, and film broadcasting program in 1985. After graduating from college, he became employed as a news director at a radio station, later joining The Canadian Press as a reporter. Brewster reported for The Canadian Press for 22 years, including over a decade covering defence and politics in Nova Scotia. In 2001, he was among the first Canadian journalists to arrive in New York City following the September 11 attacks.

During the Afghan War, Brewster spent 15 months in Afghanistan covering the war for The Canadian Press, more time than any other Canadian journalist. His book The Savage War: The Untold Battles of Afghanistan, published in 2011 by John Wiley & Sons Canada, recounts Canada's role in the war.

Based in Ottawa, Ontario, Brewster has worked in journalism for over 30 years. He is a senior defence writer for CBC News, where he covers the Canadian military and foreign policy. Brewster is the recipient of 12 national Radio and Television News Director Awards, two Atlantic Journalism Awards, and the Ross Munro Award for defence writing. He was a finalist for the Michener Award in 1989 and 2014, and a finalist for the National Newspaper Awards in 2010. In 2025, he was awarded a King Charles III Coronation Medal.

== Publications ==
=== Books ===
- Brewster, Murray (2011). The Savage War: The Untold Battles of Afghanistan. Mississauga, ON: John Wiley & Sons Canada. ISBN 978-1-1181-1593-0.

=== Book chapters ===
- Brewster, Murray (2016). "The Strange Voyage: Stephen Harper on Defence". In Ditchburn, Jennifer; Fox, Graham (eds.). The Harper Factor. Montreal: McGill–Queen's University Press. pp. 116–136. ISBN 978-0-7735-4870-1.
