= Benjamin Brewster =

Benjamin Brewster may refer to:

- Benjamin Brewster (bishop) (1860–1941), Bishop of the Episcopal Diocese of Maine, USA
- Benjamin H. Brewster (1816–1888), United States Attorney General, 1881–1885
- Benjamin Brewster (financier) (1828–1897), original stockholder in Standard Oil
- Ben Brewster (born 1947), American retired soccer player
- Ben Brewster (soccer, born 1992), American soccer player for San Francisco City FC
