= Attorney General Brewster =

Attorney General Brewster may refer to:

- Abraham Brewster (1796–1874), Attorney-General for Ireland
- Benjamin H. Brewster (1816–1888), Attorney General of the United States
- F. Carroll Brewster (1825–1898), Attorney General of Pennsylvania
- Henry Percy Brewster (1816–1884), Attorney General of Texas

== See also ==
- General Brewster (disambiguation)
