= 158th Infantry Brigade (United States) =

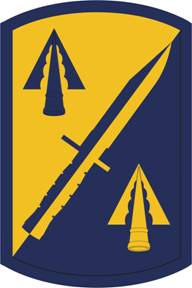
- Shoulder sleeve insignia
- Active: 1917–1945; 1962–1967; 2006 – deactivated
- Country: United States
- Branch: U.S. Army
- Type: Infantry
- Role: Training
- Size: Brigade
- Part of: First Army Division East
- Garrison/HQ: Camp Shelby, MS
- Engagements: World War I World War II
- Decorations: French Croix de Guerre with Palm, French Croix de Guerre, Fourragere
- Battle honours: World War 1: Meuse-Argonne, Lorraine; World War 2: Normandy, Northern France, Rhineland, Ardennes-Alsace, Central Europe

Insignia
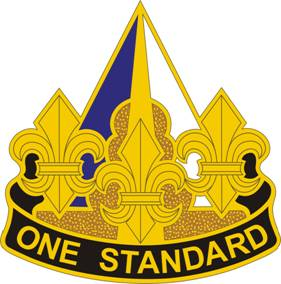
- Distinctive unit insignia

The 158th Infantry Brigade was an infantry brigade of the United States Army. It had subordinate battalions throughout Florida and Puerto Rico.

The 158th Infantry Brigade is an AC/RC unit based at Camp Shelby, Mississippi. The unit is responsible for training selected United States Army Reserve and National Guard units in Florida and Puerto Rico. The brigade was activated using the assets of the 2nd Brigade, 87th Division. The brigade was a subordinate unit of U.S. First Army. As of 2026, the brigade does not appear as a part of First Army East and was apparently deactivated.

== History ==
The brigade was constituted as Headquarters, 158th Infantry Brigade on 5 August 1917 in the National Army and assigned to the 79th Infantry Division. The unit organized at Camp Meade, Maryland on 25 August 1917. The brigade deployed to Europe and fought in World War I where it received battle streamers for participation in the Meuse-Argonne Offensive and Lorraine 1918 campaigns. After the war the brigade demobilized at Camp Dix, New Jersey, reconstituted in the Organized Reserves and assigned to the 79th Division.

The brigade converted and redesignated on 12 February 1942 as 3rd Platoon, 79th Reconnaissance Troop, 79th Division and was ordered to active military service on 15 June 1942. The unit reorganized at Camp Pickett, Virginia and again deployed to Europe where it participated in Normandy, Northern France, Rhineland, Ardennes-Alsace and Central Europe Campaigns. For actions during the war the unit received the French Croix de Guerre with Palm, with streamers embroidered PARROY FOREST and NORMANDY TO PARIS, as well as the French Croix de Guerre, Fourragere. The unit inactivated 11 December 1945 at Camp Kilmer, New Jersey.

The unit was converted and redesignated on 5 November 1962 as Headquarters and Headquarters Company, 158th Infantry Brigade while in inactive status. It was reactivated on 2 October 1997 and posted to Patrick Air Force Base, Florida.

In 1999, the brigade was redesignated as 2nd Brigade, 87th Division (Training Support).

In 2006, as part of the Army's Transformation Plan, the 2nd Brigade, 87th Division was reflagged as the 158th Infantry Brigade.

An Army Times article dated 17 August 2010 announced the brigade's move from Patrick AFB to Camp Shelby, Mississippi.

== Organization ==
The unit is composed of:

- HHC, 158th Infantry Brigade – Camp Shelby, MS
- 1st ARFT Battalion, 305th Regiment – Camp Shelby, MS
- 2nd FA Battalion, 305th Regiment – Camp Shelby, MS
- 2nd CSS Battalion, 346th Regiment – Camp Shelby, MS
- 2nd INF Battalion, 351st Regiment
- 3rd Battalion, 315th Regiment – New Cumberland, PA
- 3rd CSS Battalion, 346th Regiment – Camp Shelby, MS
- 3rd Battalion, 347th Regiment (CS/CSS) –
- 3rd Battalion, 348th Regiment (CS/CSS)

== Notable commanders ==
- Evan M. Johnson
- Robert Houston Noble
- Otho B. Rosenbaum
