= Jonathan Brewster =

Jonathan Brewster may refer to:

- Jonathan Brewster (colonist) (1593–1659), early American settler
- Jonathan Brewster (priest) (born 1967), British Anglican priest
- Jonathan Brewster, fictional character in Arsenic and Old Lace

== See also ==
- Jonathan Brewster Bingham (1914–1986), American politician and diplomat
