= 6th Infantry Regiment (United States) =

- 6th Infantry coat of arms
- Active: 1812–present
- Country: United States
- Branch: United States Army
- Type: Infantry
- Garrison/HQ: Fort Bliss, Texas
- Nickname: "Regulars"
- Mottos: Unity is Strength "Remember the Regiment" "regulars, by god"
- Engagements: War of 1812; Mexican–American War; American Civil War; Indian Wars; Spanish–American War; Philippine–American War; Mexican Expedition; World War I; World War II; Vietnam War; Panama; War in Southeast Asia; Iraq War
- Decorations: Presidential Unit Citation (2); Valorous Unit Award (4); Army Superior Unit Award

Commanders
- Notable commanders: Zachary Taylor; Henry W. Wessells; Robert H. Noble; Edwin B. Winans; David L. Stone; Walter Krueger; Walter C. Short; John W. Leonard; Norman Schwarzkopf (1st BN); Carter Ham (1st BN)

Insignia
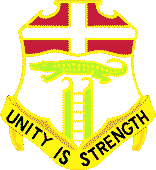
- Distinctive unit insignia

The 6th Infantry Regiment ("Regulars") was formed 11 January 1812. Zachary Taylor, later the twelfth President of the United States, was a commander of the unit. The motto, "Regulars, By God!" derives from the Battle of Chippawa, in which British Major General Phineas Riall noticed that the approaching regiment wore militia uniforms. Having defeated militia troops in the Battle of Queenston Heights, Riall assumed another easy victory, but the American regiment pressed the attack. According to the memoirs of regimental commander Winfield Scott, later commanding general of the United States Army, when Riall realized his error, he remarked: "Why, these are regulars!"

== History ==
The regiment participated in the War of 1812, the Mexican–American War, the American Civil War, the Indian Wars (1823–1879), the Spanish–American War, Philippine–American War (1899–1913), the Pancho Villa Expedition (1916–1917), World War I, World War II, and the Vietnam War. Elements of the 6th Infantry were also part of IFOR, Task Force Eagle, which was charged with implementing the military aspects of the General Framework Agreement for Peace in Bosnia and Herzegovina. In September 1989, the 4th Battalion 6th Infantry deployed to Panama, playing a key role in Operation Just Cause. In January 1994, the 1st Battalion, 6th Infantry deployed to Macedonia for Operation Able Sentry as part of the United Nations Preventive Deployment Force. In May 1998, Company B was deployed again to Bosnia-Herzegovina in support of Operation Joint Endeavor, Operation Joint Forge (OJE/OJF). In 1999, elements were deployed to Albania for the initial launch of support and liberation of Kosovo. In March 2003, Company C, 2nd Battalion, deployed with HQ V Corps to Kuwait and participated in the initial invasion of Iraq. The rest of the 2nd Battalion and 1st Battalion deployed to Iraq in late April 2003 as part of 2nd Brigade, 1st Armored Division. The "Regulars" arrived in Baghdad in May 2003 and were the first to relieve elements of the 3rd Infantry Division. The 1st and 2nd Battalions deployed again in support of Operation Iraqi Freedom in November 2005 and April 2008. The 4th Battalion, 6th Infantry, deployed in support of Operation Iraqi Freedom/New Dawn from May 2009 to May 2010. In August 2011, the 4th Battalion deployed to Al-Asad and FOB Hammer in Iraq in support of Operation New Dawn. They returned in December of that year when the U.S. and Iraqi government failed to agree on soldiers' diplomatic immunity, making the Regulars one of the last units to withdraw from Iraq.

Two battalions of the 6th Infantry Regiment are as of December 2024 assigned to the 1st Armored Division: the 1st Battalion with the 2nd Brigade Combat Team, and the 4th Battalion with the 3rd Brigade Combat Team.

== Lineage ==
=== Pre-World War I ===
Lineage

Constituted 11 January 1812 in the Regular Army as the 11th Infantry Regiment.

Organized March–May 1812 in Vermont, New Hampshire, and Connecticut.

Consolidated May–October 1815 with the 25th Infantry (constituted 26 June 1812) and the 27th, 29th, and 37th Infantry (all constituted 29 January 1813) to form the 6th Infantry Regiment. The lineages of the units that made up the 6th Infantry give the regiment campaign credit for the War of 1812.

Consolidated 1 May 1869 with the 42d Infantry Regiment, Veteran Reserve Corps (constituted 21 September 1866), and consolidated unit designated as the 6th Infantry Regiment.

Narrative

The present 6th United States Infantry traces its lineage back to 11 January 1812, when Congress authorized strengthening the regular Army in preparation for the War of 1812. The unit was first known as the 11th Infantry Regiment and served as such on the Upper Canada–US border throughout the War of 1812.

In 1831 and 1832, the regiment participated in a series of actions known as the Black Hawk War against the Sac and Fox Indians. On 2 August 1832, the 6th Infantry caught the Indians at the junction of the Bad Axe River with the Mississippi River (in present-day Wisconsin), and killed most of Black Hawk's band (records say that 950 Sac were massacred), earning the campaign streamer BLACK HAWK. In 1837, the units of the regiment left Jefferson Barracks, Missouri, for Florida via Louisiana. As part of a force commanded by Colonel Zachary Taylor, the regiment entered the Second Seminole War in eastern Florida in 1837. It was the first "guerrilla-style" war fought by US troops.

- 1848 A Company was sent from Fort Snelling to construct Fort Ripley.
- In 1850, E Company was sent from Fort Snelling to build and garrison Fort Dodge.
- In 1853, E Co. deactivated Fort Dodge and went north to assist Companies C and K in building Fort Ridgely.
- The 6th Infantry Regiment served in the Mexican–American War, participating in Scott's campaign to Mexico City. They fought in the Siege of Veracruz, at Cerro Gordo, Churubusco, Molino del Rey, and at Chapultepec.

From late 1860 to mid-1861, detachments of Company B from Fort Humboldt were involved in the Bald Hills War, patrolling and, in 1861, skirmishing with the local Indians on Mad and Eel Rivers and their tributaries.

At the outset of the Civil War in April 1861, the regiment was directed to hurry eastward from Oregon and California and join the Federal forces. According to one biographer of the time, "Several of the Regiment's best and bravest officers, honest in the mistaken construction of the Constitution and true to their convictions as to their duty, had tendered their resignations and given themselves to the Confederate cause." One of those officers was the regimental commander, Major Lewis Armistead. During the Civil War, the 6th U.S. Infantry Regiment lost 75 men during service; two officers and 29 enlisted men killed and mortally wounded, and one officer and 43 enlisted men by disease.

For six years after the Civil War, the regiment served at various stations in Georgia and South Carolina.

- Company G would be at Fort Buford, North Dakota 1n 1870.
- It moved to Fort Hays, Kansas, in October 1871. The regiment saw duty on the frontier in Kansas, Colorado, Iowa, Wyoming, Idaho and Utah.
- In 1872 under Col. William B. Hazen, the regiment was transferred to the Department of Dakota and based out of Fort Buford Dakota Territory, fighting many engagements against hostile Indian forces.
- In 1872, B & C Companies built Fort McKeen, North Dakota, which was renamed Fort Abraham Lincoln.
- In 1872 and 1873, the regiment earned campaign streamers NORTH DAKOTA 1872 and NORTH DAKOTA 1873. The next several years saw much action for the regiment during the Indian Wars, many of which were in Montana Territory, and they were awarded campaign streamers MONTANA 1879, LITTLE BIGHORN, CHEYENNES, and UTE.

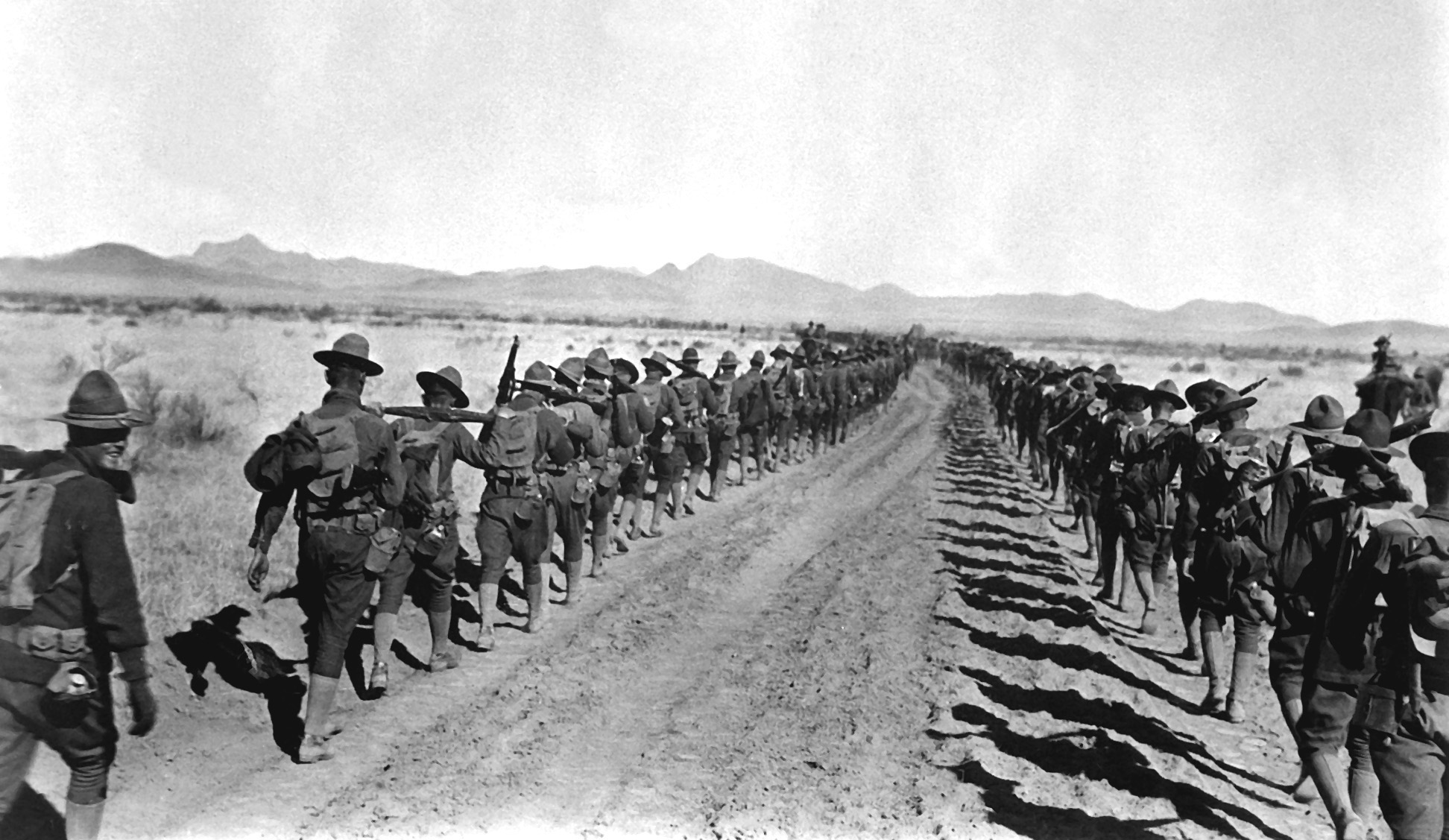
Members of the 6th and 16th marching homewards after the end of the Mexican Expedition

- In 1880, the regiment moved to Fort Thomas, Kentucky, where it remained until called to action again in June 1898, in the Spanish–American War. On 1 July 1898, the 6th Regiment took the brunt of the fighting during the charge up San Juan Hill.

The regiment returned to the United States, serving at Fort Sam Houston, Texas, from the end of 1898 until late July 1899, when it sailed to the Philippines aboard USAT Sherman to help quell the insurgents in the Philippine–American War. The Moro tribe was one of the toughest enemies the 6th had ever faced—every one of them fought to the death, and preferred to do it in hand-to-hand style. The regiment fought over 50 engagements and left with campaign streamers for JOLO, NEGROS in 1899, and PANAY in 1900. In March 1905, the regiment returned to the Philippines to fight the Moros again. For three days in 1906, elements of the regiment fought in the First Battle of Bud Dajo, one of the fiercest conflicts of the entire island campaign. The successful ending to the battle broke the Moro strength and ended the fighting in that part of the island.

One 6th Infantry soldier received the Medal of Honor for service in the Philippines: Captain Bernard A. Byrne, 19 July 1899, Bobong, Negros.

Following service in the Philippines, the 6th returned to the Presidio of San Francisco, California. In May 1914, it entered into service on the Mexican border. In March 1916, it proceeded to San Antonio, Chihuahua, as part of the Punitive Expedition under Brigadier General John J. Pershing. In February 1917, Pershing's force withdrew from Mexico, and the regiment moved to Fort Bliss. Because of their action, the regiment was awarded another campaign streamer – MEXICO 1916–1917.

=== World War I ===
Lineage

Assigned 18 November 1917 to the 5th Division

Narrative

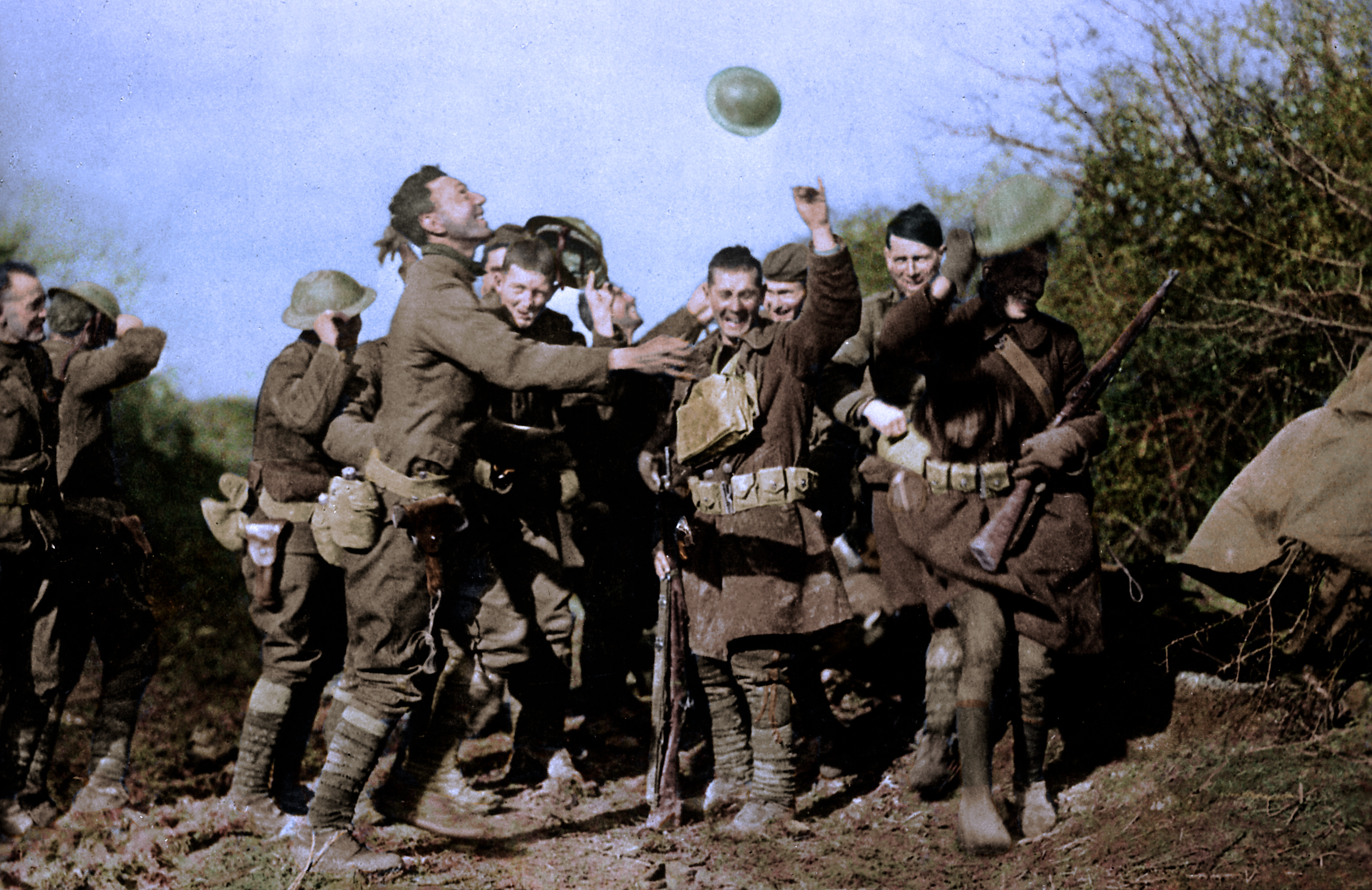
Doughboys of the 6th Infantry Regiment, 10th Brigade, 5th Division, stationed at Remoiville, rejoice as they receive news of the Armistice on the eleventh day of the eleventh hour of the eleventh month.

In December 1917, the 6th Regiment was assigned to the 10th Infantry Brigade, 5th Division, and began training stateside. In the latter part of May 1918, the 6th Infantry Regiment was declared ready for introduction to combat and was placed at the disposal of the French for service at the front. In July 1918, a strategic offensive plan was agreed upon by the Allied commanders, whose immediate purpose was to reduce the salients that interfered with further offensive operations. One of these was the Saint-Mihiel salient. The First U.S. Army was organized on 10 August and directed to launch an offensive on 12 September to reduce this salient. The 6th Regiment was destined to play an important role in this operation. On 1 December 1918, the 6th Regiment marched from Luxembourg to the city of Trier, Germany, becoming the first American troops to enter that ancient city.

=== Inter-war period ===
The 6th Infantry Regiment arrived at the port of New York on 13 July 1919 on the troopship USS America, and emergency period personnel were discharged from the service. The regiment was transferred on 28 July 1919 to Camp Gordon, Georgia, and subsequently to Camp Jackson, South Carolina. on 29 December 1920. It was relieved in August 1921 from the 5th Division and ordered on 2 September 1921 to transfer to Jefferson Barracks, Missouri. It conducted a 1,200-mile foot march from Camp Jackson, and arrived 3 November 1921 at Jefferson Barracks. The regiment was reviewed on 3 November 1921 by General John J. Pershing, the former commander of the American Expeditionary Force, and Marshal Ferdinand Foch of France upon its arrival in St. Louis, Missouri. It was assigned to the 6th Division on 24 March 1923. It participated in tornado relief duties at St. Louis from 3–7 October 1927. The 3rd Battalion was inactivated on 31 October 1929 and was subsequently reorganized as a "Regular Army Inactive" (RAI) unit with Organized Reserve personnel; Reserve officers assigned to the regiment conducted summer training at Jefferson Barracks.

In April 1933, the regiment assumed command and control of the Jefferson Barracks Civilian Conservation Corps (CCC) District (later redesignated the Missouri CCC District). Elements participated in the “Century of Progress” exposition in Chicago, Illinois, from May–November 1933. When the 6th Division was converted to a "triangular" division in 1939, the regiment was temporarily assigned to the 7th Division's 14th Infantry Brigade on 16 October 1939. The 3rd Battalion, less Reserve personnel, was activated in early 1940 at Jefferson Barracks. The entire regiment was transferred on 2 March 1940 to Fort Knox, Kentucky, and was relieved on 1 June 1940 from the 14th Infantry Brigade. The regiment returned to Jefferson Barracks on 1 July 1940, was reorganized and redesignated the 6th Infantry Regiment (Armored) on 15 July 1940, and assigned to the 1st Armored Division. It was transferred back to Fort Knox on 7 August 1940. In April, the regiment supplied a cadre for the 51st Infantry Regiment of the 4th Armored Division. In August, the regiment moved to Louisiana to conduct maneuvers, then returned to Fort Knox in November.

=== World War II ===
The 1st Armored Division was one of the first American units to sail across the Atlantic to do battle with the Axis. Leaving from Fort Dix, New Jersey on 11 April 1942, the Old Ironsides set foot on European soil in Northern Ireland on 16 May 1942. Here, they trained with a new intensity as they prepared to go into battle for the first time.

==== Algeria-French Morocco ====
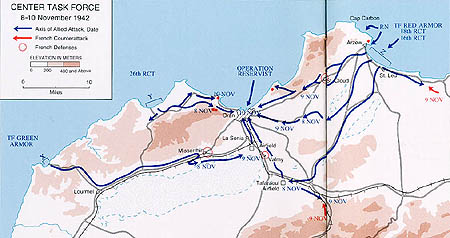
Map showing the movements of the Center Task Force in Operation Torch.

On 8 November 1942, almost a full year after the attack on Pearl Harbor, the Allied American, Free French, and British armies launched Operation Torch, the seaborne invasion of French North Africa. COL Claud E. Stadtman commanded the 6th Armored Infantry Regiment at this time, and his force was divided into different Combat Commands and Task Forces. 3rd Battalion-6th Infantry (3-6 IN), under the command of LTC George F. Marshall, was assigned to Operation Reservist with the mission of sailing directly into the Oran harbor and capturing valuable facilities and ships before the Vichy French could mount an effective resistance. The amphibious assault began shortly after 0200, but one landing craft's engine caught fire, alerting the defenders to their presence. They were met with a devastating volley from the French shore defenses, which also managed to destroy their Royal Navy escort ships, HMS Hartland and HMS Walney. Out of 393, 9 officers were killed (including LTC Marshall), 180 enlisted men were killed, and 5 officers and 152 enlisted men were wounded. Only 47 men survived unscathed. For their outstanding courage under fire in their first action of WWII, 3-6 IN was awarded the Distinguished Unit Citation, but ceased to exist as a fighting unit for the time being.

Despite this disaster, the other landings of Operation Torch were still scheduled to be underway in the morning. The vehicles and men of General Lunsford E. Oliver's Task Force Red (TF Red) began landing at Z Beach to the east of Oran in the Gulf of Arzew with the mission of seizing the Tafaraoui airfield. Attached to this TF was E Company, 2nd Battalion-6th Armored Infantry (2-6 IN) under CPT Donald A. Kersting. 1LT R. H. Leed's 1st Platoon, E/2-6 IN was the advance guard for the Task Force, and they managed to reach the airfield by 1100. Attacking alongside elements of the 1st Battalion-1st Armored Regiment, LT Leeb's Platoon rolled onto the airfield from the east. At the same time, 2nd and 3rd PLTs (under LTs J. F. Sullivan and Jesse E. Frank, respectively) blocked off approaches from Oran and managed to capture an enemy ammunition train. TF Red's initial objective had been accomplished.

To the west of Oran, 1st Battalion, 6th Armored Infantry (1-6 IN), under the command of LTC William B. Kern, was assigned to TF Green and quickly assaulted and captured Y Beach without opposition. B Company was detached from 1-6 IN and joined 1st Battalion-13th Armored Regiment in their push to secure La Senia airfield, but the flying column was delayed by French anti-tank guns, forcing TF Green to halt for the day. A platoon from E Co, to the east, was brought in to help secure the airfield on 9 November. On 10 November, TF Red and TF Green converged on Oran. In the initial push into Oran, A Company (under CPT Thomas Hoban), as well as the Battalion cannon platoon for 1-6 IN, supported TF Green's attack. Oran was secured by 1215 after French hold-outs and snipers were cleared from the city. At this point, many of the Vichy French soldiers joined the Free French and the Allied cause, and the Vichy government was dissolved by the Germans. The Vichy soldiers fought halfheartedly against an erstwhile enemy they didn't hate. Still, the 6th Armored Infantry Regiment's next enemy would not be so easy.

==== Tunisia ====
After the Vichy French forces were defeated in Algeria, Allied efforts moved east, toward Tunisia. In a series of rapid thrusts beginning on 24 November, elements of the 1st Armored Division and other Allied units began advancing on Tunis. Despite early American success, a German-Italian force under General Wolfgang Fischer counterattacked on 1 December, driving Allied units back. LTC McGinness' 2-6 Infantry arrived in the area that afternoon and began staging for an Allied counterattack. The next day, 2 December, Axis units began harassing Allied lines of communication along the Medjez-el-Bab-Tebourba road, so LTC Kern's 1-6 Infantry was sent to destroy them, which they did with the help of C Bty, 27th Armored Field Artillery Battalion. By 4 December, the enemy had retaken the town of Tebourba, and the Allied forces rushed to get into defensive positions after plans for a counterattack were abandoned. 1st and 2nd Battalions of the 6th Armored Infantry formed the main body of this defensive line, supported by elements of the 1st Armored Regiment, 13th Armored Regiment, 27th Field Artillery, and 701st Tank Destroyer Battalion.

LTC Kern's 1-6 Infantry, supported by B and C Bty, 27th Artillery, occupied the most exposed position of the Allied line at Djebel el Guessa and Djebel Bou Aoukaz. Between these two hill masses, there lies an east–west pass that enemy forces would need to seize if they were to pierce the Allied line. The Battalion was strung out over five miles, and the platoons were separated by deep ravines, making it difficult for them to support each other. On the morning of 5 December, a clear, cool day, 1-6 IN came under enemy observation and endured heavy mortar and artillery fire, a sign that the enemy was soon to attack. A Co, under CPT Hoban, spotted enemy digging in to the north of Djebel el Guessa, so LTC Kern moved B Co, under CPT Walter Geyer, onto the ridge behind A Co to gain depth in his defense. After a night of continual illumination from flares, the Germans attacked on the morning of 6 December at roughly 0800. A combined attack from Stuka dive-bombers, infantry, and tanks hit A Co. Seven Panzers attacked through a gap in the ridgeline, isolating 3rd Platoon and allowing German infantry to advance up the sheltered ravines. At 0900, another German armored attack, twice the size of the first, attacked C Co, under CPT George Miller, from multiple directions. This attack left C Co disorganized, and the Germans seemed likely to cut off 1-6 IN's route of escape. Allied armored elements began massing to counterattack elsewhere along the line. For hours, 1-6 IN held on to their positions. A Co was temporarily relieved when it pulled in its left flank by using the Battalion machine-gun platoon to pin down enemy infantry. After a counterattack by B Co's halftracks, A Co successfully withdrew to the ridge held by B Co. To the south, C Bty, 27th Artillery, fired support missions for C Co, 1-6 IN, temporarily checking the German advance and allowing CPT Miller's company to reorganize, but at the cost of the destruction of the Battery from German counterfire. Meanwhile, the Battalion Reconnaissance Platoon began seeking a ford in the Medjerda River to bring in armored reinforcements. 1-6 IN's one remaining assault gun fired and maneuvered against the German vehicles, and despite not destroying any of them, the crew delayed their advance long enough to allow arriving reinforcements to cross the river without being fired upon.

Finally, E Co, 2-6 IN arrived at 1117 and forded the Medjerda River but were forced to leave all their vehicles behind. The rest of LTC McGinness' Battalion arrived and forced the river at 1228. With the arrival of these fresh infantrymen and some tanks from 2-13 Armor, the Germans temporarily withdrew, allowing LTC Kern to reorganize his exhausted Battalion on the flat terrain behind the armor. The Americans then counterattacked but were severely defeated by German defensive positions and anti-tank guns, leaving many destroyed M3 Lee tanks behind, burning under the desert sky. The losses of the day had been severe. A Co and B Co had suffered heavily, and CPT Geyer had been wounded. C Co's Commander, CPT Miller, had been killed, and the company had lost many men and much of its equipment. Despite this, the 1st Battalion, 6th Armored Infantry Regiment, had performed bravely in its defense against superior enemy armored units, and its exploits would go down in 1st Armored Division history.

==== Italy ====
They landed in Italy on 28 October 1943. The regiment remained there until it was reorganized on 20 July 1944, and its elements were redesignated as elements of the 1st Armored Division as follows:

- 6th Armored Infantry Regiment (less 2d and 3d Battalions) as the 6th Armored Infantry Battalion
- 2d Battalion as the 11th Armored Infantry Battalion
- 3d Battalion as the 14th Armored Infantry Battalion

One soldier of the 6th Armored Infantry Regiment and its successor battalions received the Medal of Honor for service during World War II; Private Nicholas Minue, Company A, 6th Armored Infantry Regiment, 28 April 1943, near Medjez el Bab, Tunisia (posthumous)

After the war, the above units changed as follows:

- 6th Armored Infantry Battalion converted and redesignated 1 May 1946 as the 12th Constabulary Squadron; concurrently relieved from assignment to the 1st Armored Division and assigned to the 1st Constabulary Regiment. Inactivated 20 September 1947 in Germany. Converted and redesignated 10 October 1950 as the 6th Infantry (less 2d and 3d Battalions) and relieved from assignment to the 1st Constabulary Regiment
- 11th Armored Infantry Battalion converted and redesignated 1 May 1946 as the 11th Constabulary Squadron; concurrently relieved from assignment to the 1st Armored Division and assigned to the 1st Constabulary Regiment and inactivated 20 September 1947 in Germany. Converted and redesignated 7 April 1949 as the 11th Armored Infantry Battalion and relieved from assignment to the 1st Constabulary Regiment. Redesignated 10 October 1950 as the 2d Battalion, 6th Infantry
- 14th Armored Infantry Battalion converted and redesignated 1 May 1946 as the 14th Constabulary Squadron; concurrently relieved from assignment to the 1st Armored Division and assigned to the 15th Constabulary Regiment. Inactivated 20 December 1948 in Germany and relieved from assignment to the 15th Constabulary Regiment; concurrently converted and redesignated as the 14th Armored Infantry Battalion and assigned to the 1st Armored Division. Redesignated 10 December 1950 as the 3rd Battalion, 6th Infantry, and relieved from assignment to the 1st Armored Division

=== Post World War II ===
Lineage

The 6th Infantry was activated on 16 October 1950 in Germany.

Reorganized 1 June 1958 as a parent regiment under the Combat Arms Regimental System.

Withdrawn 16 June 1989 from the Combat Arms Regimental System and reorganized under the United States Army Regimental System.

Narrative

In October 1950, the 6th Infantry was reconstituted as a regular infantry regiment forming the U.S. garrison in West Berlin, designated as Berlin Command. The existing garrison units, the 16th Constabulary Squadron and the 3rd Battalion, 16th Infantry, were reflagged as the 1st and 3rd Battalions, 6th Infantry. The 2nd Battalion was assembled from troops in West Germany.

In 1958, the Berlin Command was reorganized as a Pentomic unit. The 6th Regiment was reorganized as the 2nd and 3rd Battle Groups, 6th Infantry. The 1st Battalion (1st Battle Group) was redesignated as the 1st Armored Rifle Battalion. On 1 December 1961, the occupation forces were designated Berlin Brigade. In 1964, the Berlin Brigade was reorganized again. The 2nd and 3rd Battle Groups were redesignated as the 2nd and 3rd Battalions, 6th Infantry, and the 4th Battalion was also formed from the cadre of the two battle groups.

=== Vietnam War ===
On 17 May 1967, the 1st Battalion, 6th Infantry was reorganized as a standard Infantry Battalion. It was assigned to the 198th Light Infantry Brigade, in the Americal (23rd Infantry) Division. The 1–6th Infantry was the division's first element ashore, arriving at Chu Lai in October to participate in its thirty-fifth campaign and ninth war. After a brief initial operation south of Đức Phổ, the battalion was assigned the mission of securing the installation at Chu Lai.

1–6th Infantry participated in Task Force Oregon, Task Force Miracle, Operation Wheeler/Wallowa, Operation Burlington Trail, and had the mission of protecting Americal Division Headquarters and Chu Lai Defense Command from enemy ground mortar and rocket attacks. The 1st Battalion, 6th Infantry was awarded the Valorous Unit Citation for its victory at the Battle of Lo Giang, 7–11 February 1968. Task Force Miracle was formed in February 1968 during the enemy's Tet Offensive when the city of Da Nang was threatened by the 60th Main Force Viet Cong Battalion. The 1st Battalion, 6th Infantry and 2nd Battalion, 1st Infantry assisted the Marines in the fighting. After four days of fierce fighting, the threat to Da Nang was obliterated, and the task force was deactivated and returned to the Americal area of operation. During the Vietnam War, the Sixth was awarded streamers – COUNTEROFFENSIVE PHASE III, TET COUNTEROFFENSIVE, COUNTEROFFENSIVE PHASE IV, COUNTEROFFENSIVE PHASE V, COUNTEROFFENSIVE PHASE VI, TET 69 / COUNTEROFFENSIVE, SUMMER-FALL 1969, WINTER-SPRING 1970, SANCTUARY COUNTEROFFENSIVE, COUNTEROFFENSIVE PHASE VII, and CONSOLIDATION I.

On 15 February 1969, the battalion was released from the 198th Light Infantry Brigade and assigned to the 23rd Infantry Division, Americal Division.

=== Cold War ===
On 13 September 1972, he was reassigned to the 1st Armored Division and posted at Stork Barracks in Illesheim, West Germany.

During the 1st Armored Division's closing months at Ft Hood, Texas, in 1970-71, before the division's assignment to Germany, the 5th Battalion, 6th Infantry, served as the 1st Brigade's mechanized infantry battalion.

In 1974, the regiment was split again, this time between Germany and the United States. The 1st Battalion was assigned to the 1st Brigade, 1st Armored Division in Illesheim, Germany. The 2nd Battalion was assigned to the 2nd Brigade, 1st Armored Division, in Erlangen, Germany, a three-tank-battalion brigade with 2nd Battalion, 6th Infantry, as the brigade's mechanized infantry.

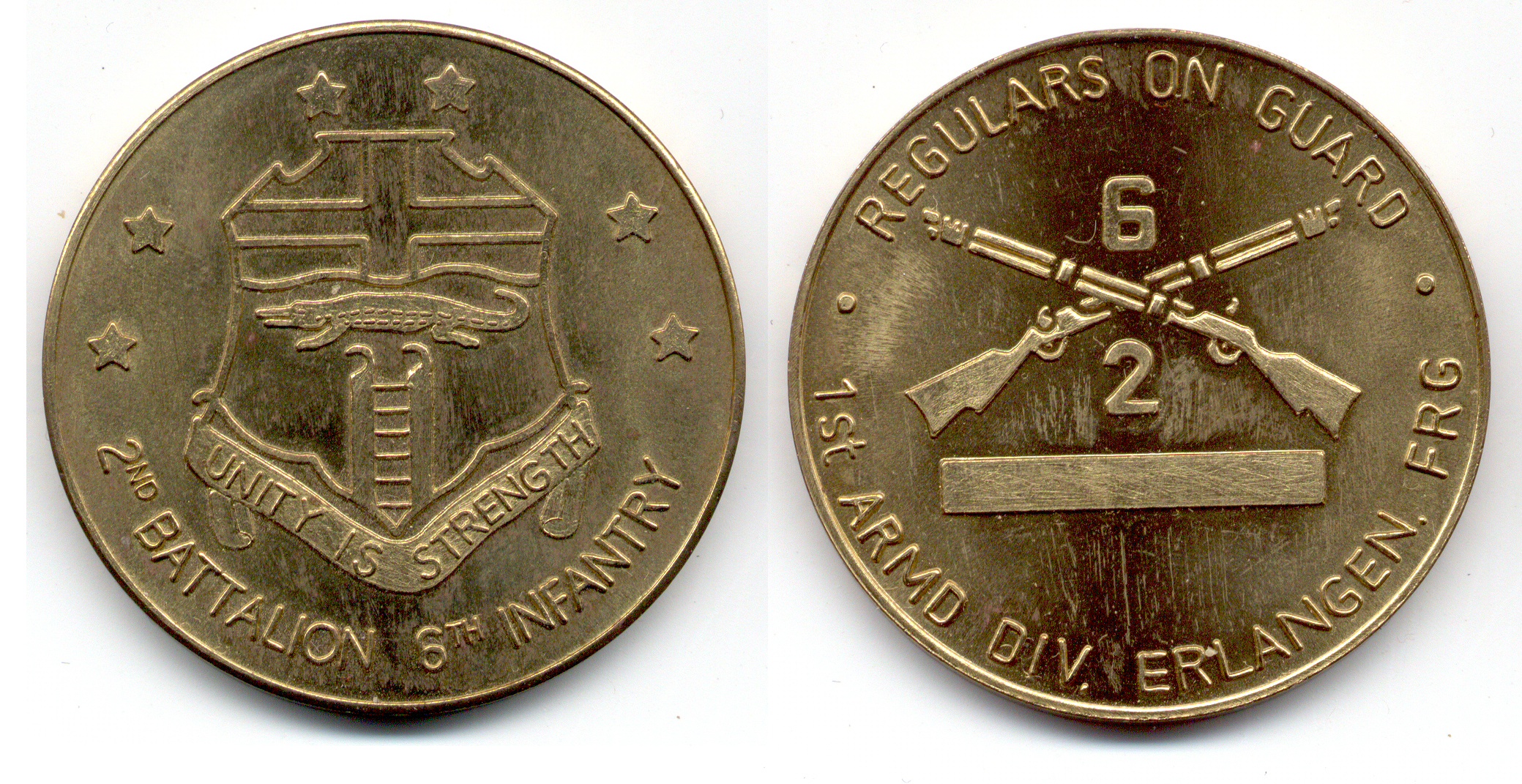
2nd Battalion, 6th Infantry Regiment Coin of Excellence, 1984–1992, Erlangen, Germany.

The three Berlin Brigade battalions were reflagged as the 4th, 5th, and 6th Battalions of the 502nd Infantry. The 3rd and 4th Battalions were assigned to the 2nd Brigade, 5th Infantry Division, at Fort Polk, Louisiana, where elements participated in Operation Just Cause in Panama in 1989, earning the campaign streamer – PANAMA - and the Valorous Unit Award for Panama. In 1989, the unit also received the Army Superior Unit Award. The 5th Battalion was assigned to the 3rd Brigade of the 5th Infantry Division. The 6th and 7th Battalions were assigned to the 3rd Brigade, 1st Armored Division, Bamberg, Germany.

=== Post-Cold War ===
In 1990, the 6th and 7th Battalions were called upon to participate in the regiment's tenth war, Operation Desert Shield/Desert Storm. During that war in the Persian Gulf, the regiment earned campaign streamers – DEFENSE OF SAUDI ARABIA, LIBERATION AND DEFENSE OF KUWAIT, and CEASE-FIRE, as well as Valorous Unit Citations for Iraq and Iraq-Kuwait.

In 1993, the 5th Infantry Division was deactivated, and the 3rd, 4th, and 5th Battalions were re-flagged under the 2nd Armored Division at Fort Hood. In early 1990, the 1st Battalion moved from Illesheim to Vilseck, Germany, as part of 1st Brigade, 1st Armored Division. In late 1990, as part of deployments for Desert Storm/Desert Shield, 1st Battalion became a component of the 3rd Brigade, 3rd Infantry Division, and the 6th and 7th Battalions were deactivated. The 4th Battalion was then reflagged again as 2/7 Cavalry under the 1st Cavalry Division (United States).

=== War on Terrorism ===
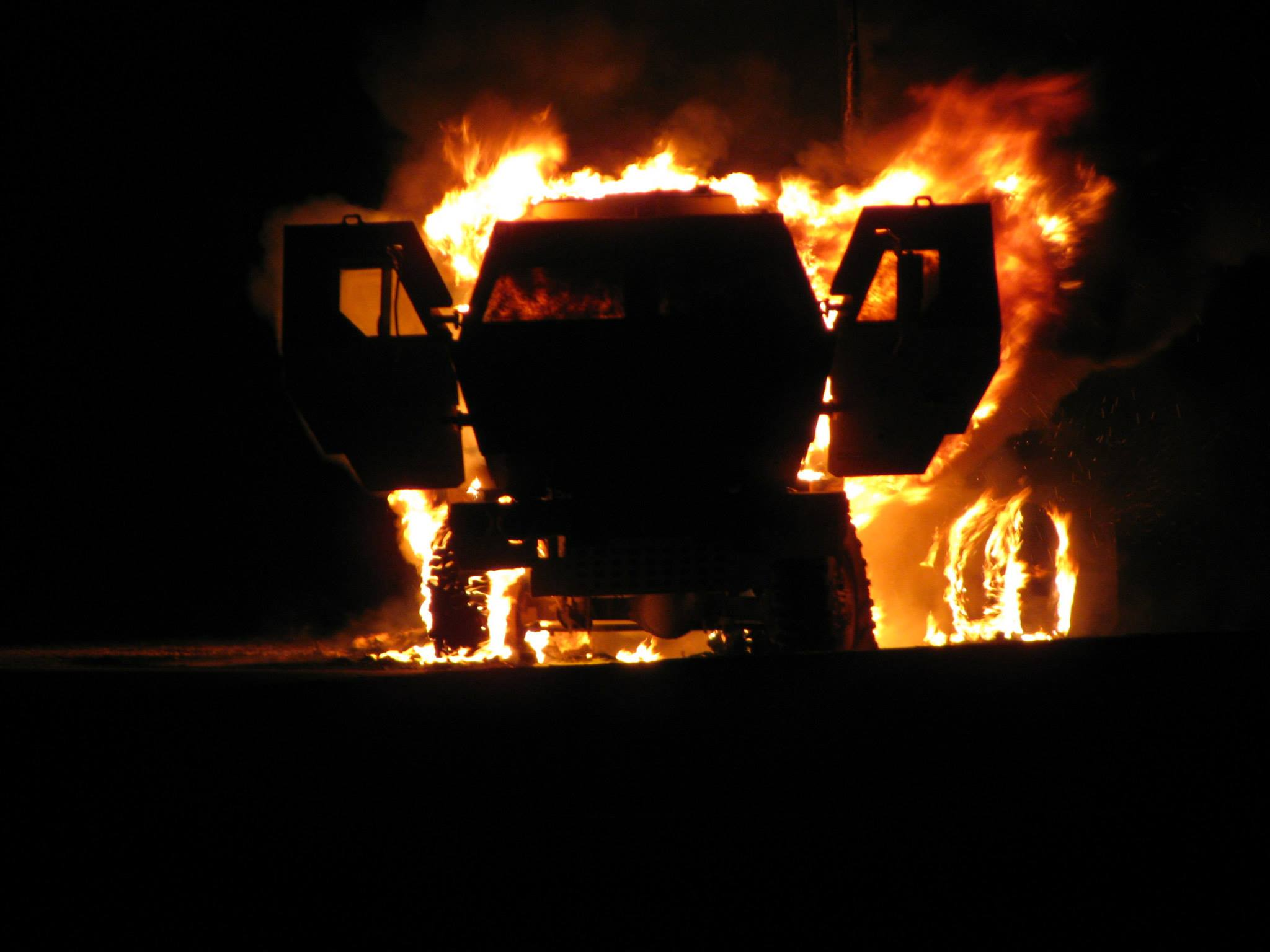
2-6 Infantry Regiment, 2BCT/1AD LMTV destroyed by an IED in Salman Pak Iraq 2008

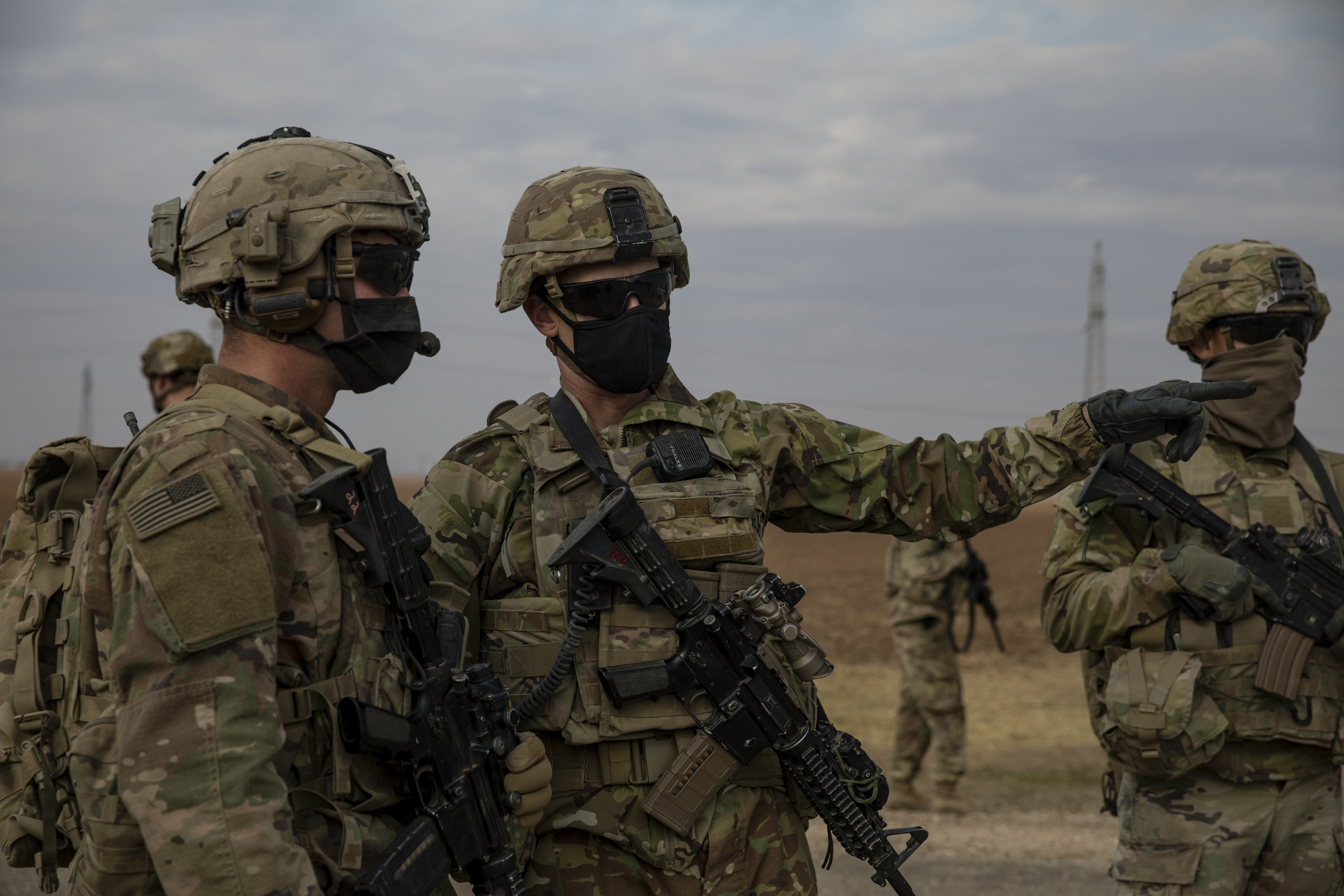
Soldiers from Alpha Company, 1-6 Infantry Regiment, 2nd ABCT in Syria during Operation Inherent Resolve, November 2020

In April 2003, the 1st Infantry Regiment deployed to Iraq for 17 months.

In November 2005, the 1st and 2nd Battalions, 6th Infantry Regiment, deployed to Kuwait, where they remained assigned to the 2nd Brigade Combat Team, 1AD, and served as part of the regional quick reaction force (QRF) stationed at Camp Buehring, Kuwait. By Spring 2006, the situation in Iraq had deteriorated, leading to the call forward of the regional force (QRF) in Kuwait. From there, Bravo Company, 2-6 IN "Death Dealers", was sent to Ramadi, Iraq (via TQ Air Base) and operationally assigned to Task Force 1-35 Armor, commanded by LTC Tony Deane. Bravo, 2-6 IN 'Death Dealers' or "Team Dealer" were assigned the hotly contested Al Tamim District of Ramadi's West side. Nearly a city unto itself, Tamim was 25 square miles of mostly AQI-controlled city. The Team Dealer Mission was to destroy enemy forces and recapture territory seized by the enemy (AQI, a precursor to ISIL), while securing the local population and helping to rebuild relationships with local leaders. Note: A Co 1/6 INF had been detached from the Battalion and assigned to assist Task Force 1/36 INF in Camp Hit and been in Iraq for most of the time the rest of the Battalion was serving as the QRF.

During that time, the Regulars operated out of the four main U.S. bases in the area: Camp Ramadi, Blue Diamond, Corregidor, and COP Dealer. These three bases provided the Regulars with a triangular perimeter from which to launch operations into the center of Ramadi. Instead of a Fallujah-style sweep, the combat outpost style of fighting was used, in which the Regulars created patrol bases deep inside various neighborhoods of the city from which to stage operations, pull security, and draw contact. The soldiers split their time between operating from the combat outposts and refitting and operating from the main bases.

B Company 2-6 IN "Team Dealer" owned and controlled its battlespace, Al-Taʾmīm. The regulars of Team Dealer were never attached to the command of other units. All units planning operations in Al-Taʾmīm, including NSW (SEALs) and other SOF or OGA units, always reported to Team Dealer before planning ops in Al-Taʾmīm. And Team Dealer leadership had command and control of all operations in Al-Taʾmīm. Team Dealer partnered with many other tactical units in Ramadi—Enablers such as NSW, Navy SEALs, EOD, Marine Anglico, and dog teams. Team Dealer ran its own separate Tactical Operations Center, separate from that of the Battalion Task Force. Al-Taʾmīm belonged to the Dealer because its soldiers patrolled it every day and knew the battlefield and their enemy well. It was precisely because Team Dealer brought so much firepower to the fight that they made all final operational decisions.

Time magazine called Ramadi the most dangerous place on the planet at that time. The Regulars served alongside the 1st Battalion, 506th Infantry, "Red Currahee," Seal Team Three, and many other units. One Navy SEAL, Michael Monsoor, was posthumously awarded the Medal of Honor for saving the lives of several of his team members during intense fighting in Ramadi. The Regulars were awarded a Meritorious Unit Commendation as part of the 2nd Brigade of the 1st Armored Division for their actions in Ramadi.

In 2009, the 4th Battalion, assigned to the 4th HBCT, 1st Armored Division, deployed in support of Operation Iraqi Freedom. Following a deployment to Maysan Province, the 4th Battalion was awarded the Meritorious Unit Commendation.

In August, 2011 4th Battalion, again with 4th HBCT 1st Armored, deployed to Iraq. Alpha, Delta, and Headquarters Company were assigned to Al Asad Air Base. Bravo and Charlie companies were sent to Forward Operating Base Hammer. The battalion returned home in December 2011, one of the last Army ground forces to leave Iraq at the end of Operation New Dawn.

Shortly after their return to Fort Bliss, Texas, members of the 4th Battalion were advised of an imminent deployment as security forces advise and assist teams (SFAAT) to Afghanistan. The first SFAAT teams were deployed in June 2012, only 10 months after their deployment to Iraq.

== Honors ==
=== Campaign participation credit ===
War of 1812

- Canada
- Chippawa
- Lundy's Lane

Mexican–American War

- Vera Cruz
- Cerro Gordo
- Churubusco
- Molino del Rey
- Chapultepec

Civil War

- Peninsula
- Manassas
- Antietam
- Fredericksburg
- Chancellorsville
- Gettysburg
- Virginia 1862

Indian Wars

- Seminoles
- Black Hawk
- Little Big Horn
- Cheyennes
- Utes
- South Dakota 1823
- Kansas 1829
- Nebraska 1855
- Kansas 1857
- North Dakota 1872
- North Dakota 1873
- Montana 1879

Spanish–American War

- Santiago

Philippine–American War

- Jolo
- Negros 1899
- Panay 1900

Mexican Expedition

- Mexico 1916–1917

World War I

- St. Mihiel
- Meuse-Argonne
- Alsace 1918
- Lorraine 1918

World War II

- Algeria-French Morocco (with arrowhead)
- Tunisia
- Naples-Foggia
- Anzio
- Rome-Arno
- North Apennines
- Po Valley

Vietnam

- Counteroffensive, Phase III
- Tet Counteroffensive
- Counteroffensive, Phase IV
- Counteroffensive, Phase V
- Counteroffensive, Phase VI
- Tet 69/Counteroffensive
- Summer-Fall 1969
- Winter-Spring 1970
- Sanctuary Counteroffensive
- Counteroffensive, Phase VII
- Consolidation I

Armed Forces Expeditions

- Panama

Southwest Asia

- Defense of Saudi Arabia
- Liberation and Defense of Kuwait
- Cease-Fire

=== Decorations ===
1. Presidential Unit Citation (Army) for ORAN, ALGERIA
2. Presidential Unit Citation (Army) for MT. PORCHIA
3. Valorous Unit Award for LO GIANG
4. Valorous Unit Award for PANAMA
5. Valorous Unit Award for IRAQ
6. Valorous Unit Award for IRAQ-KUWAIT
7. Army Superior Unit Award(5-6 INF) Operation Nimrod Dancer for 1989
8. Joint Meritorious Unit Award (1–6 INF) (Army) 1994 Macedonia for Operation Able Sentry
9. Presidential Unit Citation (Army) for Operation Iraqi Freedom
10. Meritorious Unit Commendation(1-6 INF) OIF 05-06
11. Meritorious Unit Commendation (2-6 INF) OIF 05-06
12. Navy Meritorious Unit Commendation(1-6 INF) OIF 06
13. Navy Meritorious Unit Commendation (A, B 2-6 INF) OIF 06
14. Meritorious Unit Commendation (2–6 INF, Company HHC, A, and C) OIF 08–09
15. Meritorious Unit Commendation (4–6 INF) OIF 09–10

== Notable members ==
- 2nd Lt. Richard B. Garnett
- Battalion Commander. Carter F. Ham
- Platoon Sgt. Finnis D. McCleery
- Regimental commander John Frank Morrison
- Battalion Commander. Norman Schwarzkopf

Battalion Commander. William " Bill" Patterson

== See also ==
- Grattan Massacre
- List of United States Regular Army Civil War units
