= Senator Brewster =

Senator Brewster may refer to:

== Members of the United States Senate ==
- Daniel Brewster (1923–2007), U.S. Senator from Maryland from 1963 to 1969
- Owen Brewster (1888–1961), U.S. Senator from Maine from 1941 to 1952

== United States state senate members ==
- Jim Brewster (fl. 2010s), Pennsylvania State Senate
- Sardius Mason Brewster (1870–1936), Kansas State Senate
