= USS General A. W. Brewster =

Transport ship

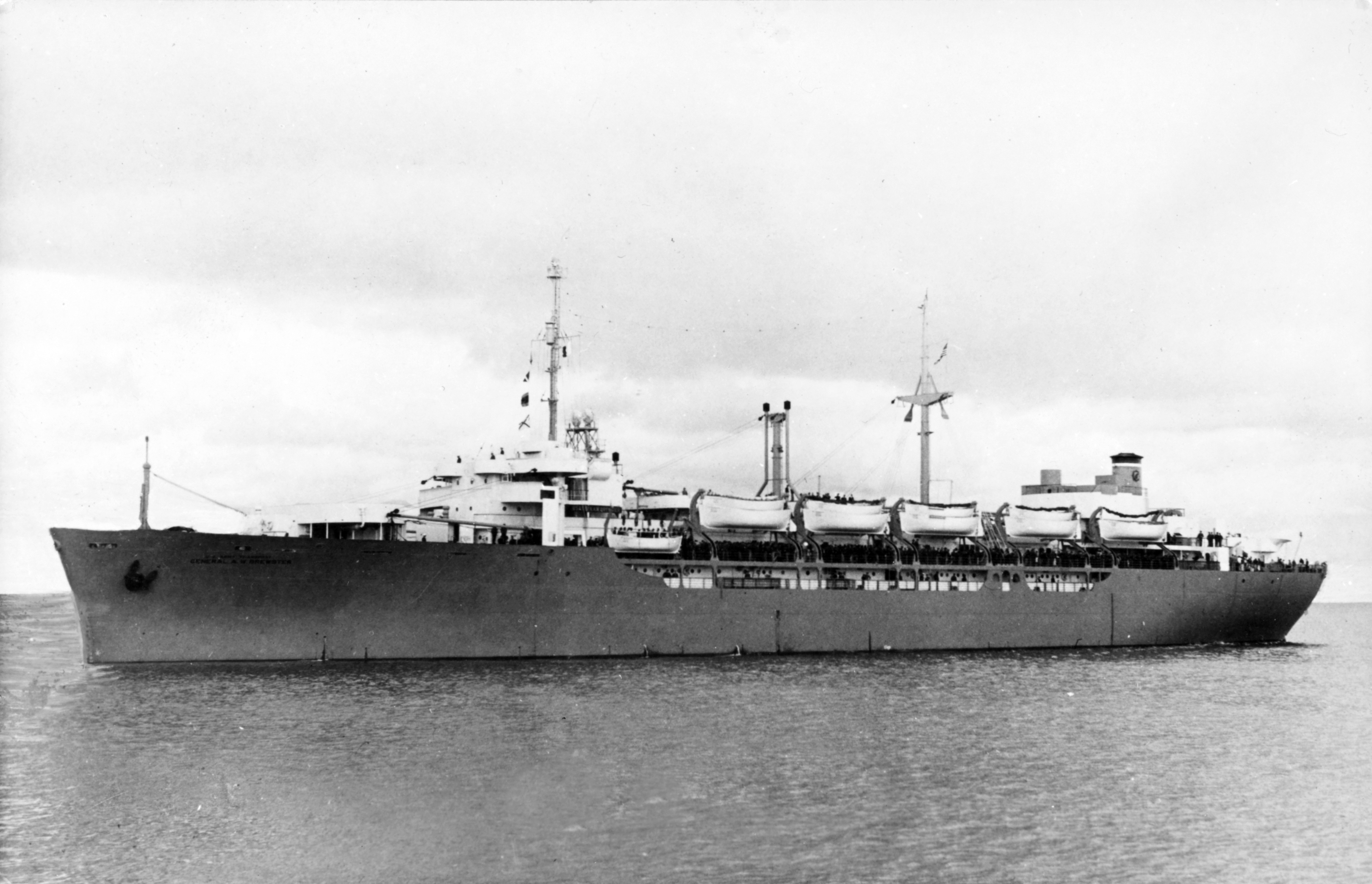
- General A. W. Brewster, circa 1946-1950

History

United States
- Name: General A. W. Brewster
- Namesake: Andre Walker Brewster
- Builder: Kaiser Co., Inc.; Richmond, California
- Laid down: 10 October 1944
- Launched: 21 January 1945
- Acquired: 23 April 1945
- Commissioned: 23 April 1945
- In service: after 10 April 1946 (Army); 1 March 1950 (MSTS)
- Out of service: 1 March 1950 (Army); December 1954 (MSTS)
- Renamed: SS Philadelphia, 1968
- Reclassified: T-AP-155, 1 March 1950
- Identification: IMO number: 6903204
- Fate: Sold for scrapping November 1987

General characteristics
- Class & type: General G. O. Squier-class transport ship
- Displacement: 9,950 tons (light), 17,250 tons (full)
- Length: 522 ft 10 in (159.36 m)
- Beam: 71 ft 6 in (21.79 m)
- Draft: 24 ft (7.32 m)
- Propulsion: single-screw steam turbine with 9,900 shp (7,400 kW)
- Speed: 17 knots (31 km/h)
- Capacity: 3,823 troops
- Complement: 356 (officers and enlisted)
- Armament: 4 × 5"/38 caliber gun mounts; 4 × 40 mm AA gun mounts; 16 × 20 mm AA gun mounts

USS General A. W. Brewster (AP-155) was a General G. O. Squier-class transport ship for the U.S. Navy in World War II. The ship was crewed by the U.S. Coast Guard throughout the war. She was named in honor of U.S. Army general Andre Walker Brewster. She was transferred to the U.S. Army as USAT General A. W. Brewster in 1946. On 1 March 1950 she was transferred to the Military Sea Transportation Service (MSTS) as USNS General A. W. Brewster (T-AP-155). She was later sold for commercial operation under the name SS Philadelphia, before being scrapped some time after November 1987.

== Operational history ==
General A. W. Brewster (AP-155) was laid down 10 October 1944 under Maritime Commission contract (MC #712) by Kaiser Co., Inc., Yard 3, Richmond, California; launched 21 January 1945; sponsored by Mrs. Bert Hotchkiss; acquired and commissioned 23 April 1945.

After shakedown out of San Diego, the transport sailed 28 May from San Pedro. Transiting the Panama Canal, she arrived Avonmouth, England, 20 June and embarked troops for Pacific ports. Sailing westward, General A. W. Brewster passed through the canal again and arrived Humboldt Bay, New Guinea, 27 July 1945. She then sailed to the Philippines, remaining there until after the capitulation of Japan. The ship embarked veterans and returned to San Francisco 1 September.

General A. W. Brewster made three additional voyages to the Far East in the immediate postwar period, bringing home thousands of servicemen. She decommissioned at San Francisco 10 April 1946 and was transferred to the Maritime Commission and later to Army Transportation Service for Pacific duty.

One journey made by USAT General A. W. Brewster left Manila in September 1946 with elements of the U.S. Thirteenth Air Force and arriving in Oakland the next month.

The ship was reacquired by the Navy 1 March 1950 and sailed for the Military Sea Transportation Service with a civilian crew. General A. W. Brewster made many voyages to Korea and Japan during the next 3 years, carrying more than 67,000 troops.

A typical voyage of this period was one that arrived in San Francisco on 25 May 1952 and was documented by photojournalists with the San Francisco News-Call Bulletin.

In 1954 the ship was diverted to the coast of Indochina for Operation Passage to Freedom. During September and November General A. W. Brewster and other navy ships brought thousands of refugees out of the northern sector of Vietnam as that country was partitioned. Returning to San Francisco, the transport was placed in Reduced Operational Status in December 1954, and was returned to the Maritime Administration 26 July 1955 . General A. W. Brewster was placed in the National Defense Reserve Fleet, Suisun Bay, California, where she remained until being sold for commercial service in 1968 under the MARAD Ship Exchange Program.

The ship was rebuilt in 1968 by Bethlehem Steel Corp, Baltimore, MD as the container ship SS Philadelphia, USCG ON 516541, IMO 6903204, for Sea Land Service. She was sold for scrapping in Taiwan in November 1987. Her propeller is on display at the Freedom Park. The exhibit’s identification plaque names USS General A. W. Brewster (AP-155) and lists the propeller’s diameter as 21 feet 8 inches and its weight as 43,800 pounds. General A. W. Brewster received five battle stars for Korean War service.
