= Judge Brewster =

Judge Brewster may refer to:

- Elisha Hume Brewster (1871–1946), judge of the United States District Court for the District of Massachusetts
- Leo Brewster (1903–1979), judge of the United States District Court for the Northern District of Texas
- Rudi M. Brewster (1932–2012), judge of the United States District Court for the Southern District of California
