= Camp Eagle =

US military base in Bosnia and Herzegovina

Camp Eagle was a US military base in Bosnia and Herzegovina, near Tuzla. Camp Eagle's construction began on January 14, 1996 and served as a base for US soldiers after the Bosnian War. The base was in use to help aid the country of Bosnia after the war. Within Camp Eagle there were many things inside such as a workout facility, a chapel, a basketball court and a movie theater. There was even a food court in the base that had Burger King as an option. The base was occupied up until 2004, and in 2007 it was handed over to the Armed Forces of Bosnia and Herzegovina.
