= Alpheus Dimmick =

American politician

- Born: March 22, 1787; Bloomingsburgh, New York, U.S.
- Died: January 17, 1865 (aged 77); Bloomingsburgh, New York, U.S.
- Occupation: Lawyer
- Children: Samuel E. Dimmick
- Relatives: Milo Melankthon Dimmick (nephew); William H. Dimmick (nephew)

Alpheus Dimmick (March 22, 1787 – January 17, 1865) was an American lawyer and politician.

Alpheus Dimmick graduated from Yale College in 1810. He commenced the practice of law in Bloomingburgh, Sullivan County, New York, where he continued to reside through life. In 1828 he was a member of the New York State Legislature, and was subsequently county judge and surrogate. He died in Bloomingburgh, aged 77 years. He was the father of Samuel E. Dimmick, Attorney General of Pennsylvania. His nephews Milo Melankthon Dimmick and WIlliam H. Dimmick were also notable in law and politics. He was mentor to another nephew, Oliver Smith Dimmick, who became a judge.
