= Peter H. Kostmayer =

American politician

Peter Kostmayer
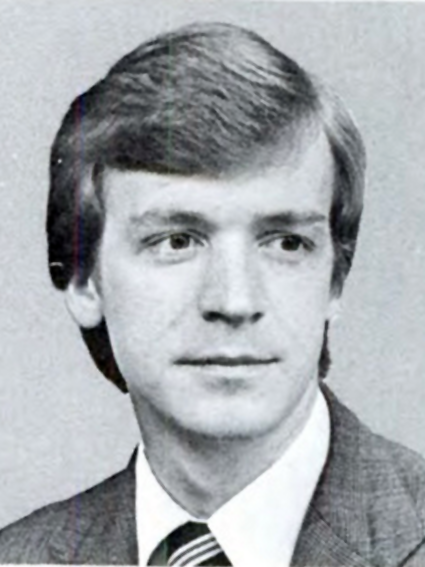

Member of the U.S. House of Representatives from Pennsylvania's 8th district
- In office January 3, 1983 – January 3, 1993
- Preceded by: James K. Coyne III
- Succeeded by: James C. Greenwood
- In office January 3, 1977 – January 3, 1981
- Preceded by: Edward G. Biester Jr.
- Succeeded by: James K. Coyne III

Personal details
- Born: Peter Houston Kostmayer; September 27, 1946 (age 80) New York City, New York
- Party: Democratic
- Spouse(s): Pamela Jones Rosenberg (m. 1982; div. 1991) Doug Hirn (m. 2021)
- Education: Columbia University (BA)

Peter Houston Kostmayer (born September 27, 1946) is a Democratic politician who served seven terms in the U.S. House of Representatives from Bucks County, Pennsylvania.

== Early life and career ==
Kostmayer was born in New York City, graduated from West Nottingham Academy in Colora, Maryland, in 1965, and received a B.A. from Columbia University in New York City in 1971.

Kostmayer worked as a reporter from 1971 to 1972. He served as press secretary to Pennsylvania Attorney General J. Shane Cramer from 1972 to 1973 and deputy press secretary to Governor Milton Shapp from 1973 to 1976.

== Congress ==
Following the retirement of U.S. Rep. Edward Biester in 1976, Kostmayer ran against State Representative John S. Renninger for the open seat in Pennsylvania's 8th congressional district. With Jimmy Carter winning Pennsylvania in the 1976 election, Kostmayer won by a 1,312 vote margin. He won re-election in 1978 against G. Roger Bowers with 61% of the vote. He lost in 1980 with Ronald Reagan sweeping to victory, Republican James Coyne narrowly defeated Kostmayer.

Kostmayer won back the seat in a 1982 rematch by 2,300 votes. Kostmayer won re-election in 1984 over David Christian by fewer than 4,000 votes. He then enjoyed victories in 1986 over David Christian again by a much larger margin and in 1988 over PA Republican State Senator Edward Howard and then again in 1990 over Bucks County Clerk of Courts, Audrey Zettick. In 1992, Kostmayer faced State Senator James C. Greenwood, who had been a legislative aide to Kostmayer's first opponent, John Renninger. Greenwood defeated Kostmayer with almost 52% of the vote.

== Later career ==
Kostmayer became the Administrator, Region III (Philadelphia) of the Environmental Protection Agency from 1994 to 1995. Later, he served as the President of Zero Population Growth. He entered the race for Pennsylvania State Senate in 2002 against incumbent Senator Tommy Tomlinson. Kostmayer was defeated, taking 47% in the general election. Kostmayer is a former CEO of the Citizens Committee for New York City.

== Personal life ==
In 1982, Kostmayer married Pamela Jones Rosenberg, a businesswoman with two children from her previous marriage. They divorced in 1991.

In 2004, Kostmayer began dating Douglas Hirn, a tax attorney and 30 years his junior. They married in 2021 and moved from Manhattan's West Village neighborhood to Brooklyn, and then to a three-bedroom condo in the Two Bridges neighborhood on the East Side of Manhattan.

U.S. House of Representatives
Preceded by Edward G. Biester Jr.	Member of the U.S. House of Representatives from Pennsylvania's 8th congressional district 1977–1981	Succeeded by James K. Coyne III
Preceded by James K. Coyne III	Member of the U.S. House of Representatives from Pennsylvania's 8th congressional district 1983–1993	Succeeded by James C. Greenwood
U.S. order of precedence (ceremonial)
Preceded by John Shadegg as Former U.S. Representative	Order of precedence of the United States as Former U.S. Representative	Succeeded by Doug Walgren as Former U.S. Representative
