= Samuel E. Dimmick =

American politician

Samuel Erskine Dimmick

Attorney General of Pennsylvania
- In office January 22, 1873 – October 11, 1875
- Governor: John F. Hartranft
- Preceded by: F. Carroll Brewster
- Succeeded by: George Lear

Personal details
- Born: December 24, 1822
- Died: October 18, 1875 (aged 52) Harrisburg, Pennsylvania, US
- Party: Republican
- Spouse: Lucretia M. Benjamin
- Children: 5
- Profession: Attorney

Samuel Erskine Dimmick (December 24, 1822 – October 11, 1875) was a Pennsylvania lawyer, active in Republican politics. He served as state Attorney General, and died in office.

== Biography and career ==
Dimmick was the son of Alpheus Dimmick, a New York lawyer, judge, and state legislator, and Maria Carr. He studied law (1844–1846) with his cousin William Harrison Dimmick. In 1846, Dimmick entered the bar and became partners with his cousin, until the latter's death in 1861. In 1856, the two Dimmicks ran for the same U. S. House seat, Samuel lost.

In addition to his regular practice, Dimmick was attorney for the Delaware and Hudson Canal Company, county commissioners, and the Honesdale Bank.

Dimmick was a state delegate to the national Republican conventions of 1860, 1864, and 1868. In 1872, Dimmick was an unaffiliated delegate at large to the state Constitutional Convention. In January 1873 he resigned upon being appointed state Attorney General. Despite falling ill, he continued to work until his death.

== Notable relatives ==
Alpheus was the son of Deacon Oliver Dimmick and Sarah Gurley. Several of Alpheus' brothers were also lawyers, including Dan, two of whose sons, Milo Melankthon and William Harrison, served in the U.S. House of Representatives from Pennsylvania. Oliver's mother was Ann Bradford, daughter of Joseph, son of William, son of William Bradford, of the Mayflower. The direct Dimmock line in the Americas dates to as early as 1635, and claims descent from the British Dymoke family of hereditary King's Champions.

After his death, first son Walter Erskine would marry Mary Scott Lord, daughter of the chief engineer of the Delaware and Hudson Canal Company, but die of typhoid three months later. Mary would later become former President Benjamin Harrison's second wife. His second son Joseph Benjamin would eventually be mayor of Scranton.

Legal offices
Preceded by F. Carroll Brewster	Attorney General of Pennsylvania; 1873–1875	Succeeded by George Lear
