= Jim Greenwood (American politician) =

American politician (born 1951)

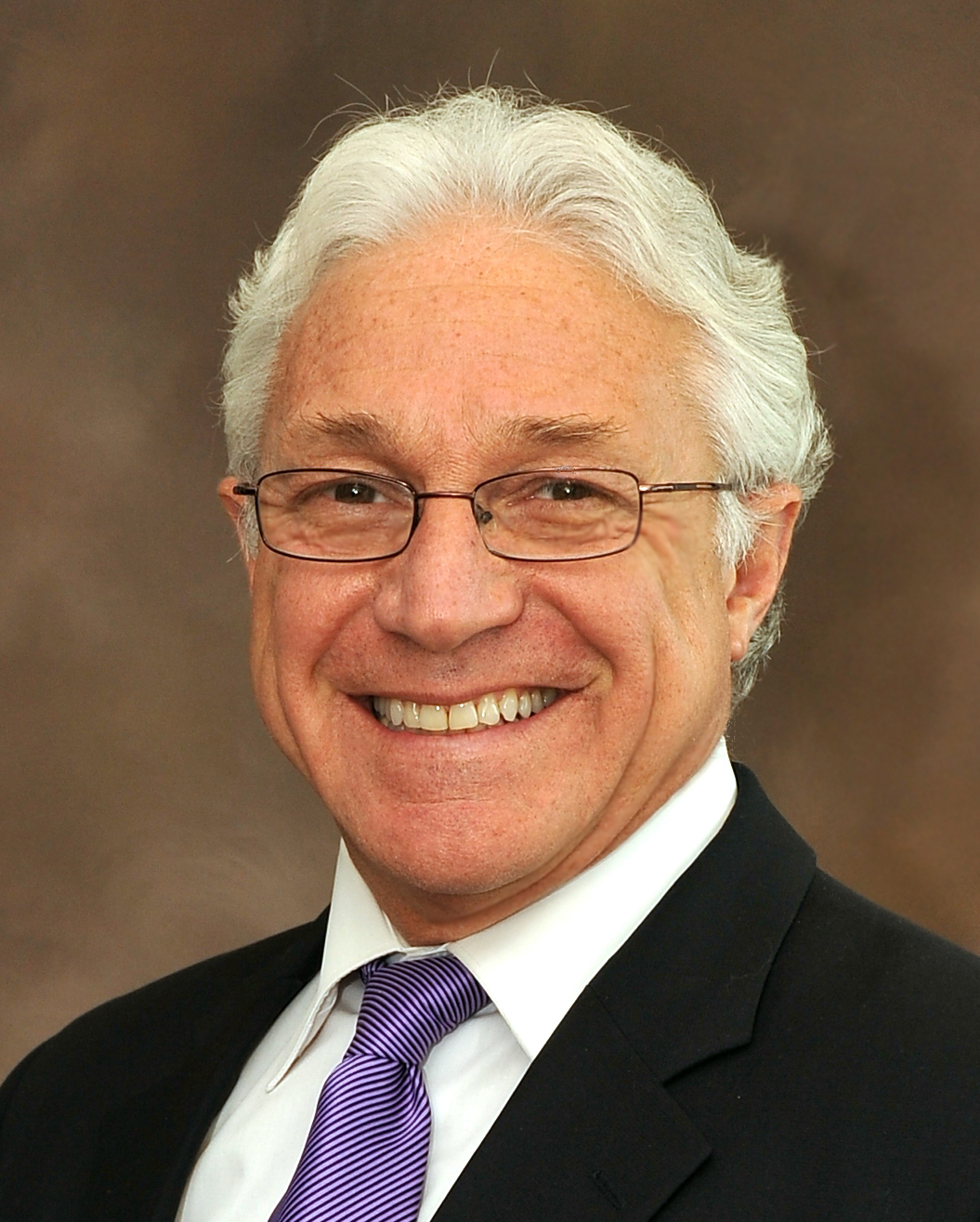

Member of the U.S. House of Representatives from Pennsylvania's 8th district
- In office January 3, 1993 – January 3, 2005
- Preceded by: Peter Kostmayer
- Succeeded by: Mike Fitzpatrick

Member of the Pennsylvania Senate from the 10th district
- In office January 6, 1987 – January 3, 1993
- Preceded by: Edward Howard
- Succeeded by: David Heckler

Member of the Pennsylvania House of Representatives from the 143rd district
- In office January 6, 1981 – November 30, 1986
- Preceded by: Margaret George
- Succeeded by: David Heckler

Personal details
- Born: James Charles Greenwood; May 4, 1951 (age 75) Philadelphia, Pennsylvania, U.S.
- Party: Republican
- Spouse: Tina Paugh
- Education: Dickinson College (BA)

James Charles Greenwood (born May 4, 1951) is an American politician. He represented Pennsylvania's eighth congressional district for six terms in the United States House of Representatives. He is a member of the Republican Party, and was a member of its moderate wing.

Greenwood became president and CEO of the Biotechnology Innovation Organization (BIO) in 2004.

== Personal life ==
Greenwood was born in Philadelphia, Pennsylvania, and grew up in Holland, Pennsylvania. He graduated from Dickinson College with a B.A. in sociology in 1973, served as an aide to state representative John S. Renninger and as a houseparent for children with intellectual disabilities and emotional disorders. From 1977 until 1980, he was a caseworker for the Bucks County Children and Youth Social Service Agency, working with abused and neglected children.

He and his wife, Tina, have four children.

== Political career ==
Greenwood served as a Republican member of the Pennsylvania House of Representatives for the 143rd district from 1981 to 1986 and the Pennsylvania Senate for the 10th district from 1987 to 1992. In 1992, Greenwood defeated Democratic Congressman Peter H. Kostmayer for a seat in the U.S. House of Representatives representing Pennsylvania's 8th district.

As a centrist with libertarian views on social issues and conservative stances on taxes and economic issues, Greenwood's overall voting record was moderate. He was known as an effective legislator. He voted against two of the four impeachment charges against President Bill Clinton in 1998, and sided with the House Democrats to oppose Partial-Birth Abortion Ban Act in 2003. He also served on the House Energy and Commerce Committee and was Chairman of the Subcommittee on Oversight and Investigations. In this role, he led investigations and held hearings on a variety of issues within the vast jurisdiction of the Committee including corporate governance, bioterrorism, port and border security, drug importation, and the safety of nuclear power plants.

A co-founder and co-chair of the House Oceans Caucus, Greenwood was the author of comprehensive, bipartisan legislation to preserve, protect, and research ocean resources. He also worked to increase communication among world leaders to address international environmental issues. As a member of the Education and Workforce Committee, he was a leading voice in the efforts to ensure that sufficient federal funds were appropriated to meet the needs of children in special education programs and to prevent school violence.

Greenwood announced in the midst of the 2004 congressional election that he would not seek re-election and retire. He had already won the 8th district's Republican primary, and his abrupt withdrawal raised many questions. Greenwood released a statement saying: "From time to time during my twenty four years of public service, I have been approached and offered other types of challenges and opportunities. Such has been the case in the last few days, and I am currently reviewing one of these opportunities. I will make my decision public in the very near future and will have no other statement until then." Bucks County Commissioner Mike Fitzpatrick was selected as the new Republican nominee in a special party convention, and went on to win the general election.

After serving six terms in Congress, Greenwood was appointed president and CEO of the Biotechnology Innovation Organization (BIO), a biotechnology trade association based in Washington, DC.

== After politics ==
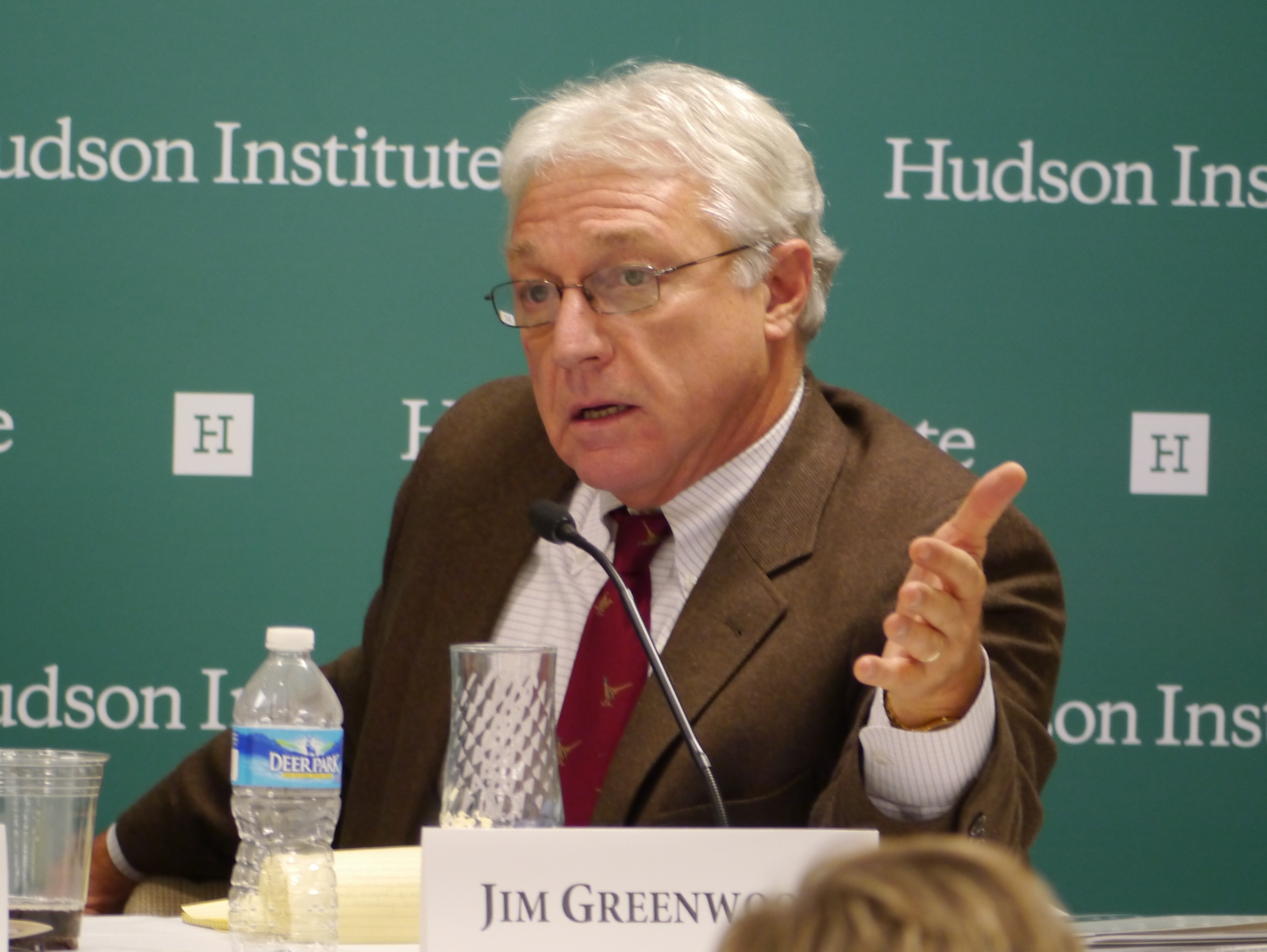
Greenwood speaking at the Hudson Institute

Greenwood was the president and CEO of the Biotechnology Innovation Organization (BIO) from 2005 to 2020. BIO represents more than 1,200 biotechnology companies, academic institutions, state biotechnology centers, and related organizations across the United States and in more than 30 other nations. BIO members are involved in the research and development of healthcare, agriculture, industrial and environmental biotechnology products. From 2020-2023 He served as the Chair of the Life Sciences Policy and Advicacy Group at the DLA Piper law firm.

In addition to his work with BIO, Greenwood is a member of the Bipartisan Commission on Biodefense, a group that advocates and encourages changes to U.S. policy to make national biodefense systems stronger. In order to address biological threats facing the nation, the Commission has conveened public hearings with panels of experts on a wide range of biodefense issies. In 2015 the Commission published a "Blueprint for Biodefense" warning of the inevitability of a global pandemic - a 33-step initiative for the U.S. Government to implement. Headed by former senator Joe Lieberman and former governor Tom Ridge, the study panel assembles in Washington, D.C., for meetings concerning current biodefense programs. Since the death of Senator Lieberman, former HHS Secretary of the Department of Health and Human Services has served as the Commission's co-chair. The study panel has repeatedly concluded that the federal government is not sufficiently prepared for a biological event. The National Blueprint for Biodefense, proposed a string of solutions and recommendations for the U.S. Government to take, including items such as giving the vice president authority over biodefense responsibilities and merging the entire biodefense budget. These solutions represent the panel's call to action in order to increase awareness and activity for pandemic related issues.

An avid bird photographer, Greenwood, In 2014, Greenwood joined the board of directors of the National Audubon Society. He also served on the board of directors of the James A. Michener Art Museum. Additionally, he is a member of the ReFormers Caucus of Issue One.

Greenwood serves on the board of directors of biotechnology companies, X-Therma and TheracosBio and on the boards of the Foundations Academy charter score and the Heritage Conservancy. He is an advisor to AI company Enterra Solutions and to Sigmapharm Laboratories.

While remaining a registered Republican, Greenwood has actively supported the campaigns of President Joe Biden, Vice President Kamala Harris and Pennsylvania Governor Josh Shapiro.

== Electoral history ==
Pennsylvania's 8th congressional district: Results 1992–2002
Year	Democrat	Votes	Pct	Republican	Votes	Pct		3rd Party	Party	Votes	Pct	3rd Party	Party	Votes	Pct	
1992	Peter H. Kostmayer	114,095	46%	James C. Greenwood	129,593	52%		William H. Magerman	Magerman for Congress	5,850	2%					
1994	John P. Murray	44,559	27%	James C. Greenwood	110,499	66%		Jay Russell	Libertarian	7,925	5%	Robert J. Cash	Cash for Congress	4,191	3%	
1996	John P. Murray	79,856	35%	James C. Greenwood	133,749	59%		Richard J. Piotrowski	Libertarian	6,991	3%	David A. Booth	Constitutional	5,714	3%	*
1998	Bill Tuthill	48,320	33%	James C. Greenwood	93,697	63%		Scott Wolfertz	Constitutional	3,917	3%	James R. Blair	Reform	1,229	1%	*
2000	Ronald L. Strouse	100,617	39%	James C. Greenwood	154,090	59%		Philip C. Holmen	Reform	5,394	2%					
2002	Timothy T. Reece	76,178	37%	James C. Greenwood	127,475	63%	*									

*Write-in and minor candidate notes: In 1996, write-ins received 12 votes. In 1998, Natural Law candidate Carolyn Boyce received 1,022 votes and write-ins received 15 votes. In 2002, write-ins received 34 votes.

U.S. House of Representatives
Preceded by Peter Kostmayer	Member of the U.S. House of Representatives from Pennsylvania's 8th congressional district 1993–2005	Succeeded by Mike Fitzpatrick
U.S. order of precedence (ceremonial)
Preceded by William J. Green III as Former U.S. Representative	Order of precedence of the United States as Former U.S. Representative	Succeeded by John E. Peterson as Former U.S. Representative
