= Senator Streeter =

Senator Streeter may refer to:

- Alson Streeter (1823–1901), Illinois State Senate
- Anne Streeter (1926–2023), Connecticut State Senate
- Farris B. Streeter (1819–1877), Pennsylvania State Senate

== See also ==
- Senator Street (disambiguation)
