= Marvin Keller =

Marvin Keller may refer to:

- Marvin Keller (politician) (1906–1976), American politician
- Marvin Keller (footballer) (born 2002), Swiss footballer
