= F. Carroll Brewster =

American politician

Frederick Carroll Brewster
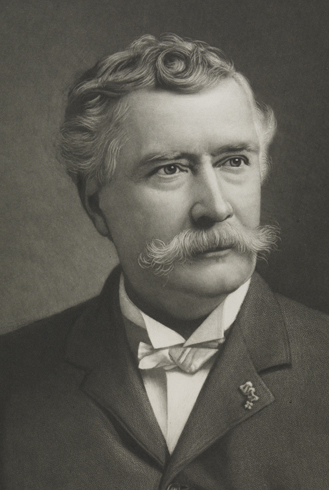
- 1873 mezzotint

Attorney General of Pennsylvania
- In office October 26, 1869 – January 22, 1873
- Governor: John W. Geary
- Preceded by: Benjamin H. Brewster
- Succeeded by: Samuel E. Dimmick

Personal details
- Born: May 15, 1825 Philadelphia, Pennsylvania
- Died: December 30, 1898 (aged 73) Charlotte, North Carolina
- Party: Republican
- Spouse: Emma Barton
- Children: 5
- Education: University of Pennsylvania
- Profession: Attorney, judge

Frederick Carroll Brewster (May 15, 1825 – December 30, 1898) was a prominent Philadelphia lawyer and judge, who served as state Attorney General. He wrote commentaries on law.

== Life and career ==
Brewster was born the son of Francis Enoch Brewster (a descendant of William Brewster, of the Mayflower) and his mistress, Isabella Anderson. The father mostly ignored his wife and legitimate children, who would become lawyer Benjamin H. Brewster and author Anne Hampton Brewster, and the half-siblings would grow up mutually estranged.

Brewster was graduated from the University of Pennsylvania in 1841, he studied law with his father, and was admitted to the bar in 1844.

In 1850, Brewster married Emma Barton, who descended from William Rittenhouse on both sides of her family and from Jonathan Dickinson Sergeant through her mother. His father's death left his estate to Brewster and his full brother, leaving out the legitimate children entirely. Benjamin negotiated a split of the estate without consulting Anne, she sued, and the matter would not be settled for several years.

In 1862, Brewster was elected City Solicitor. In 1866, he was elected Judge of the Court of Common Pleas. In 1867, his half-brother Benjamin was appointed state Attorney General. Benjamin proved to be too critical, and Governor Geary insultingly replaced him as Attorney General with F. Carroll, and then reappointed F. Carroll for a full term of his own.

He died in 1898, and his remains were buried in the St. James the Less cemetery, Philadelphia.

== Bibliography ==
=== Legal works ===
- A treatise on practice in the Pennsylvania courts. Philadelphia: Allen, Lane & Scott. 1889.

=== Non-legal works ===
- Molière in outline. Philadelphia: J. M. Goldy & Son. 1885.
- Disraeli in outline. Philadelphia: Allen, Lane & Scott. 1890.
- From Independence Hall around the world. Philadelphia: The Levytype company. 1895.

== Works cited ==
- In Memoriam: F. Carroll Brewster. Philadelphia: Allen, Lane & Scott. 1899.
- "Courts Honor F. C. Brewster". The Philadelphia Times. January 4, 1899. p. 6.
- Jenkins, Howard Malcolm; Seilhamer, George Oberkirsh (1898). Memorial History of the City of Philadelphia, from Its First Settlement to Year 1895. Philadelphia: New York History Company. ISBN 9785871274941.
- Larrabee, Denise M. (1992). Anne Hampton Brewster: 19th-century Author and "social Outlaw". The Library Company of Philadelphia. ISBN 9780914076865.
- McClure, Alexander Kelly (1905). Old time notes of Pennsylvania. Vol. 2. Philadelphia: The J. C. Winston Company.
- Morris, Charles (1896). Men of the Century. Philadelphia: L. R. Hamersly & Co.

Legal offices
Preceded by Benjamin H. Brewster	Attorney General of Pennsylvania; 1869–1873	Succeeded by Samuel E. Dimmick
