= Ethel Hillyer Harris =

American author (1859–1931)

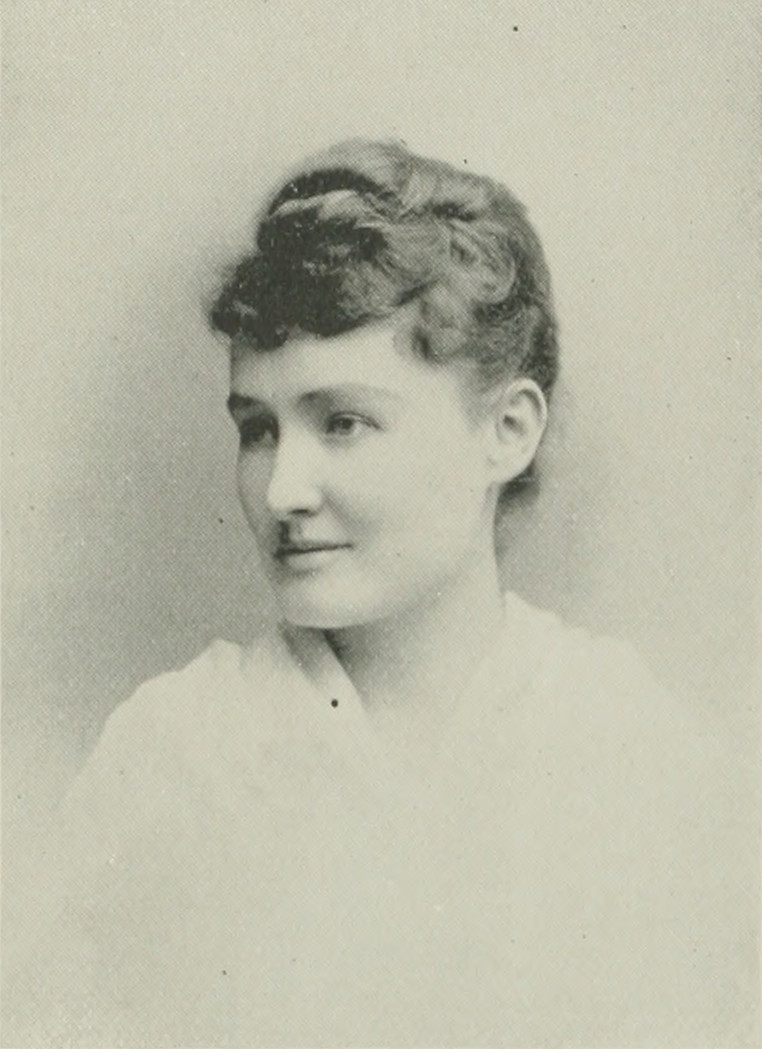
Photo in A Woman of the Century, 1897

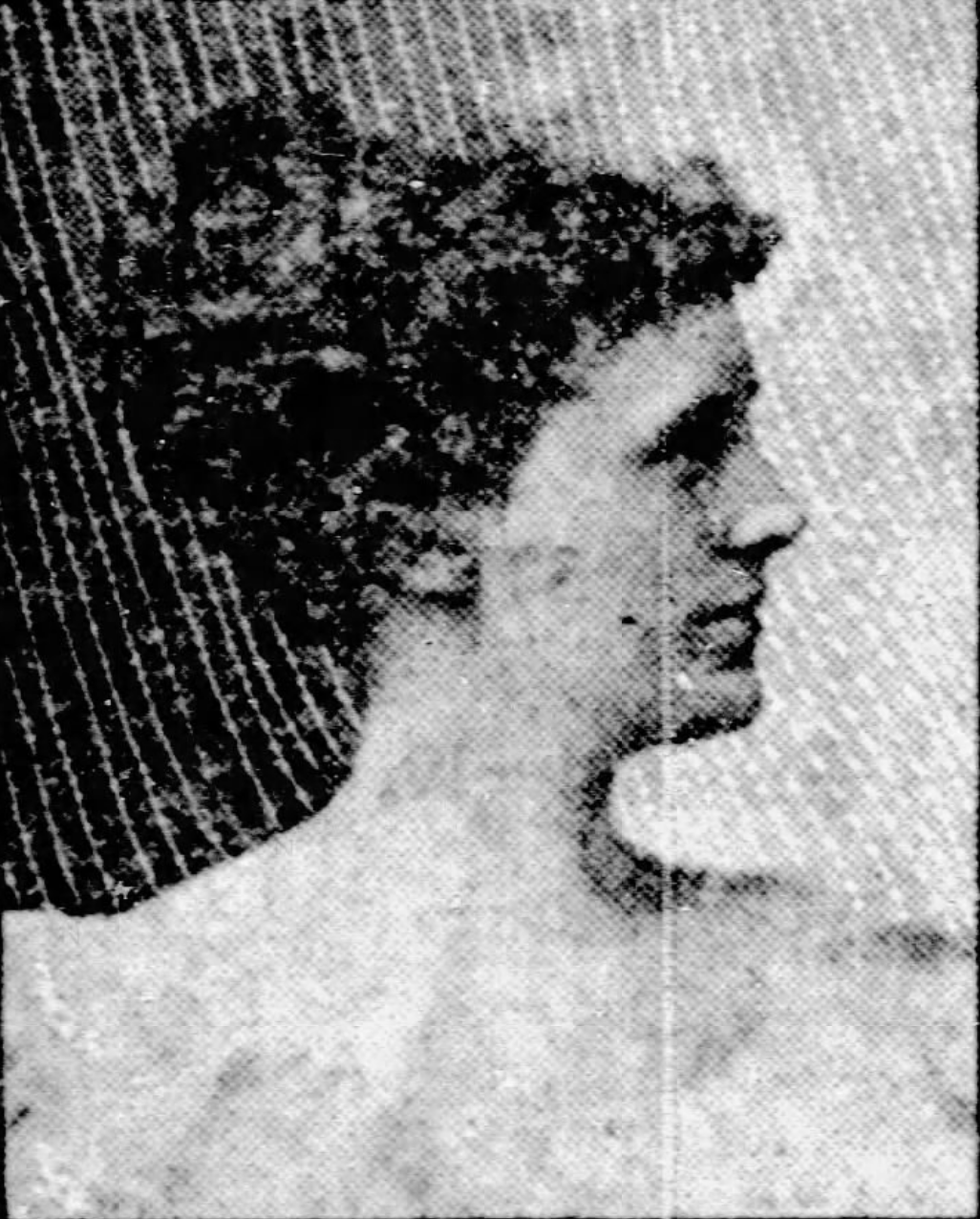
Photo in The Atlanta Journal, 1900

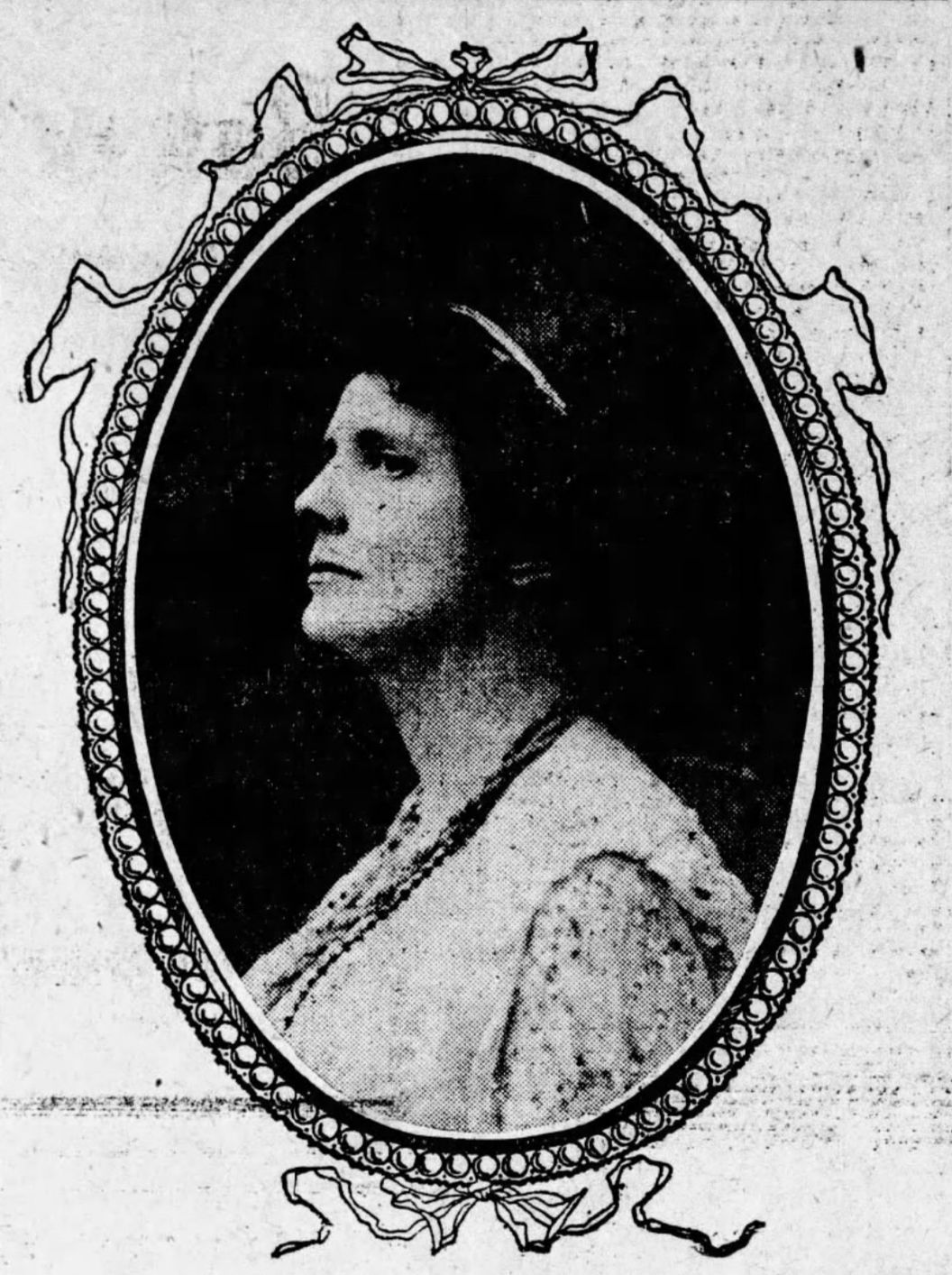
Photo in The Atlanta Journal, 1914

Ethel Hillyer Harris (née Hillyer; after first marriage, Harris; after second marriage, Brown; January 29, 1859 – September 24, 1931) was an American author from Georgia. A descendant of two signers of the Declaration of Independence, she was educated at Shorter College where she was recognized for her writing talent. She was known for her Southern literature, including negro dialect and pathetic sketches, which were praised by critics. She was a member of the United Daughters of the Confederacy (UDC) and the Daughters of the American Revolution (DAR).

== Early life and education ==
Ethel Hillyer was born and reared in Rome, Georgia. A daughter of Dr. Eben Hillyer and a granddaughter of Judge Junius Hillyer, she comes from one of the best known families in Georgia. Her grandfather served five years in Congress and was the friend of such men as Stephens, Toombs, Hill and Cobb. She was a niece of Judge George Hillyer, of Atlanta, a prominent member of the Georgia bar. On her grandmother's side, she was a lineal descendant of Lyman Hall and George Walton, two of the signers of the Declaration of Independence, and consequently, she was a member of the DAR.

She was educated in Shorter College (now Shorter University), and while still a student, was regarded as a bright and original writer. She graduated after taking the full course, including music, Latin and French.

== Career ==
Harris contributed to some of the leading papers of the country. Many of her negro dialect and pathetic sketches were praised by literary critics.

She was a member of the UDC.

== Personal life ==
First, she married Thomas Willis Hamilton Harris (1856-1892), a lawyer, of Cartersville, Georgia. They had two children, a son, and a daughter. Mr. Harris died of consumption in Cartersville, on January 12, 1893.

Secondly, on January 13, 1915, she married Perrin Brown, of Birmingham, Alabama.

Ethel Brown died in Rome, Georgia, on September 24, 1931.
