= Benjamin H. Brewster =

37th U.S. Attorney General

Benjamin Brewster
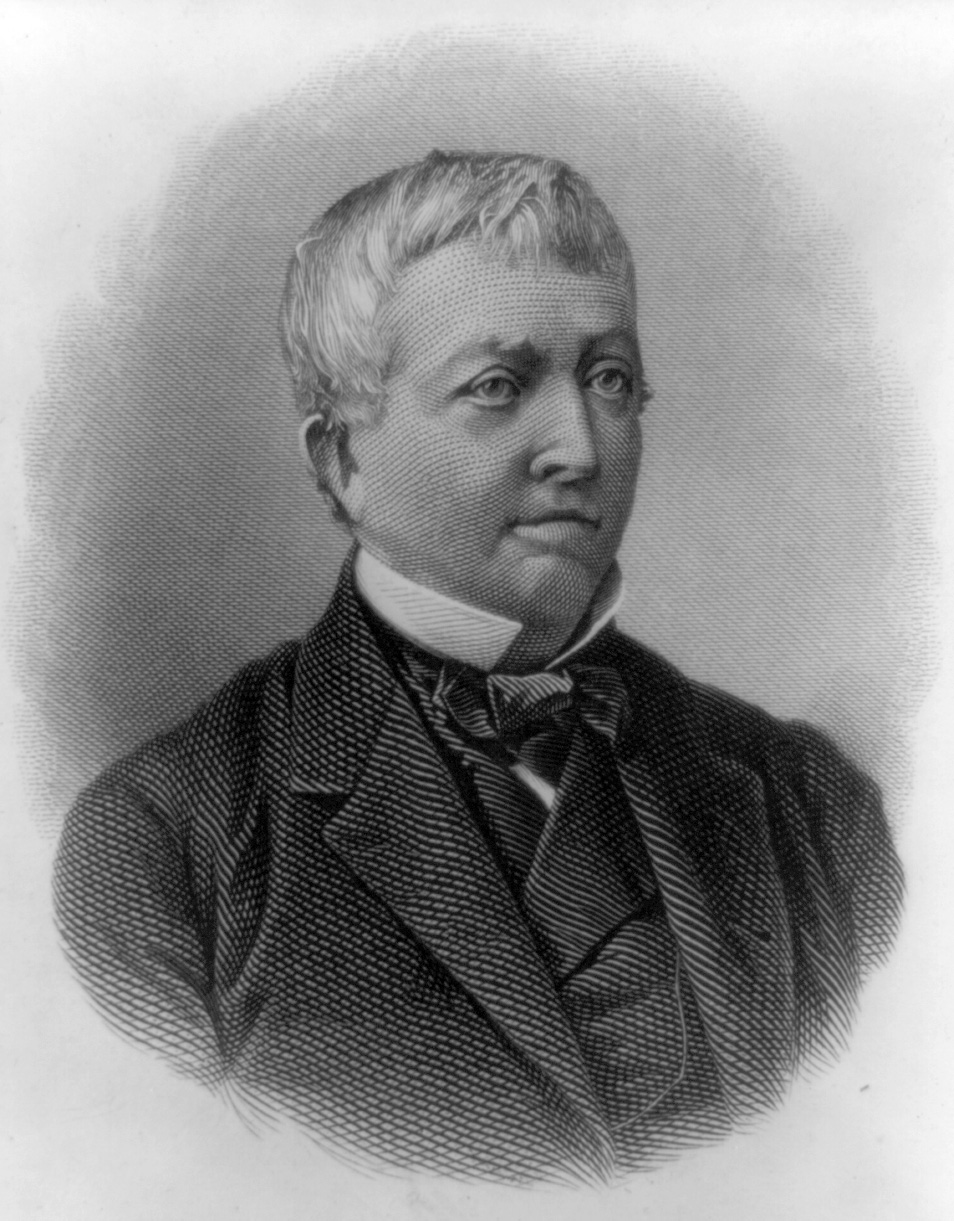

37th United States Attorney General
- In office December 16, 1881 – March 4, 1885
- President: Chester A. Arthur
- Preceded by: Wayne MacVeagh
- Succeeded by: Augustus Garland

Attorney General of Pennsylvania
- In office January 16, 1867 – October 25, 1869
- Governor: John W. Geary
- Preceded by: William M. Meredith
- Succeeded by: F. Carroll Brewster

Personal details
- Born: Benjamin Harris Brewster; October 13, 1816 Salem, New Jersey, U.S.
- Died: April 4, 1888 (aged 71) Philadelphia, Pennsylvania, U.S.
- Party: Republican
- Spouse(s): Elizabeth von Myerbach de Reinfeldts-Shulte (m. 1857; died 1868) Mary Walker-Deslonde (m. 1870; died 1886)
- Children: 1
- Education: Princeton University (BA, MA)

Benjamin Harris Brewster (October 13, 1816 – April 4, 1888) was an attorney and politician from New Jersey, who served as United States Attorney General from 1881 to 1885.

== Biography ==
=== Early life ===
He was born on October 13, 1816, in Salem, New Jersey, and grew up in Philadelphia, Pennsylvania. He was the son of Maria Hampton, a daughter of Dr. John Thomas Hampton, a soldier of the American Revolutionary War and a close friend of Thomas Jefferson. His grandmother, Mercy Harris-Hampton, was the daughter of Benjamin Harris, the "fighting Quaker" of the American Revolutionary War. Benjamin Harris Brewster was named after him.

Benjamin's father was Francis Enoch Brewster, a descendant of William Brewster, a passenger on the Mayflower. The elder Brewster was a successful and well-known attorney in Philadelphia who had abandoned Benjamin's mother, Maria Hampton, for her companion Isabella Anderson, by whom he had two children out of wedlock. His step-brothers were Frederick Carroll Brewster (1825–1898), who became Attorney General of Pennsylvania, and Enoch Carroll Brewster (1828–1863).

Benjamin's sister, Anne Hampton Brewster (1818–1892), was one of America's first female foreign correspondents, publishing primarily in Philadelphia, New York and Boston newspapers. She was a "social outlaw" (as a friend described her) by refusing to marry, by converting to Catholicism, by moving out of her older brother Benjamin's house in order to live alone, by moving to Rome, and, foremost, by continuing to write through it all, first as a dilettante and then as a self-supporting professional.

In their father's will he had named his two sons Frederick and Enoch Carroll Brewster as his sole beneficiaries. Benjamin fought on behalf of his sister for her share of the estate and for the destruction of the will, which he eventually won.

=== Education ===
He graduated from Princeton College in 1834, and was conferred upon the degrees of A.B., A.M., and LL.D. He studied law in the office of Eli Kirk Price, a noted Philadelphia lawyer and legal reformer and who was head of the Philadelphia Bar, and he was admitted to practice on January 5, 1838.

=== Marriages ===
In 1857, he married as his first wife, Elizabeth von Myerbach de Reinfeldts, the widow of Dr. Shulte of Paris, France. Elizabeth died in 1868; however, Benjamin continued to spend many vacations with his wife's parents in Germany near Cologne. There were no children from his first marriage.

He was remarried on July 12, 1870. His second wife, Mary Walker, was born in Mississippi on December 13, 1839, and died on March 9, 1886, in Philadelphia, Pennsylvania. She was the daughter of Robert John Walker, Secretary of the Treasury under President James Knox Polk and Mary Blechenden Bache. Mary Bache was the daughter of Sophia Durrell Dallas and Richard Bache Jr., who served in the Republic of Texas Navy and was elected as a Representative to the Second Texas Legislature in 1847. Sophia was the daughter of Arabella Maria Smith and Alexander J. Dallas an American statesman who served as the U.S. Treasury Secretary under President James Madison. She was a great-granddaughter of Sarah Franklin Bache and Richard Bache, and a great-great-granddaughter of Benjamin Franklin. In addition she was a niece of George Mifflin Dallas, the 11th Vice President of the United States, who served under James K. Polk.

Mary Walker married Adrien Deslonde on May 25, 1858. He was the son of André Deslonde, a sugar planter from St. James Parish, Louisiana. Deslonde's sister Caroline was the wife of P.G.T. Beauregard and his sister Mathilde was the wife of John Slidell. Walker and Deslonde later divorced, after which Mary Walker married Benjamin Brewster. The children of Mary Walker and Adrien Deslonde included Andre W. Brewster, who was raised by Brewster and took his name.

=== Family ===
Benjamin and Mary had one child, Benjamin Harris Brewster, Jr., born on October 22, 1872, in Philadelphia, Pennsylvania.

Benjamin, Sr.'s great-grandson was Daniel Baugh Brewster (November 23, 1923 – August 19, 2007), a Democratic member of the United States Senate, who represented the State of Maryland from 1963 until 1969. He was also a member of the Maryland House of Delegates from 1950 to 1958, and a representative from the 2nd congressional district of Maryland in the United States House of Representatives from 1959 to 1963.

== Career ==
In 1846 Brewster was appointed commissioner by President James K. Polk to adjudicate the claims of the Cherokee against the U.S. federal government. He was appointed Attorney General of Pennsylvania in 1867 by Governor John W. Geary.

He was chief prosecutor in the case of the U.S. Postal Service's Star Route Frauds.

In 1881, Chester A. Arthur appointed Brewster Attorney General of the United States, an office he held for the duration of Arthur's term.

== Death ==
He died on April 4, 1888, at Philadelphia, Pennsylvania, where he is buried in Woodlands Cemetery.

Legal offices
Preceded by William M. Meredith	Attorney General of Pennsylvania; 1867–1869	Succeeded by F. Carroll Brewster
Preceded by Wayne MacVeagh	U.S. Attorney General; Served under: Chester A. Arthur; December 16, 1881 – March 4, 1885	Succeeded by Augustus Hill Garland
