= Pennsylvania's 10th Senate district =

American legislative district

Pennsylvania's 10th State Senate district
Senator
Steve Santarsiero; D–Lower Makefield Township
- Population (2021): 269,925

Pennsylvania State Senate District 10 includes parts of Bucks County. It is currently represented by Democrat Steve Santarsiero.

== District profile ==
The district includes the following areas:

- Bristol
- Bristol Township
- Buckingham Township
- Chalfont
- Doylestown
- Doylestown Township
- Falls Township
- Lower Makefield Township
- Morrisville
- New Britain
- New Britain Township
- New Hope
- Newtown
- Newtown Township
- Plumstead Township
- Solebury Township
- Tullytown
- Upper Makefield Township
- Yardley

== Senators ==
Representative	Party	Years	District home	Note
Henry Welles	Democratic-Republican	1815 – 1820		
John McMeens	Republican	1819 – 1822		
Redmond Conyngham	Federalist	1823 – 1824		Pennsylvania State Senator for the 9th district from 1819 to 1822
Robert Moore	Democratic	1825 – 1828		
Jacob Drumheller	Democratic	1827 – 1832		
Uzal Hopkins	Democratic	1833 – 1836		
Peter S. Michler	Whig	1837 – 1838		Pennsylvania State Senator for the 12th district from 1835 to 1836
Abraham Shortz	Democratic	1839 – 1840		
John S. Gibbons	Democratic	1841 – 1842		
William Harrison Dimmick	Democratic	1845 – 1846		U.S. Representative from Pennsylvania's 13th congressional district from 1857 to 1861
Farris B. Streeter	Democratic	1847 – 1850		Solicitor of the United States Treasury from 1853 to 1858
Ephriam W. Hamlin	Democratic	1851 – 1854		
James H. Walton	Democratic	1855 – 1858		
Winthrop W. Ketcham	Republican	1859 – 1862		U.S. Representative for Pennsylvania's 12th congressional district from 1875 to 1876. Pennsylvania State Representative in 1858
Howkin B. Beardslee	Democratic	1863 – 1866		
Jasper Billings Stark	Democratic	1863 – 1864		Pennsylvania State Senator for the 12th district from 1865 to 1866
Charlton Burnett	Democratic	1867 – 1868		Pennsylvania State Senator for the 22nd district from 1877 to 1878
Albert Gallatin Brodhead	Democratic	1869 – 1870		Pennsylvania State Senator for the 13th district from 1871 to 1872
Joseph Thomas	Republican	1879 – 1886		
Charles Souders Vandegrift, Jr.	Democratic	1883 – 1886		
George Ross	Democratic	1887 – 1894		
Henry G. Moyer	Republican	1895 – 1898		
Hampton W. Rice	Republican	1899 – 1902		
Issac Webster Grim	Democratic	1903 – 1910		
Clarence J. Buckman	Republican	1911 – 1938		
Howard I. James	Republican	1939 – 1946		
Edward B. Watson	Republican	1947 – 1958		
Marvin V. Keller	Republican	1959 – 1970		Pennsylvania State Representative for the Bucks County district from 1949 to 1958
Edward L. Howard	Republican	1971 – 1986		
James C. Greenwood	Republican	1987 – 1993		U.S. Representative for Pennsylvania's 8th congressional district from 1993 to 2005. Pennsylvania State Representative for the 143rd district from 1981 to 1986
David W. Heckler	Republican	1993 – 1997		Pennsylvania State Representative for the 143rd district from 1987 to 1993
Joe Conti	Republican	1997 – 2006		Pennsylvania State Representative for the 143rd district from 1993 to 1996
Charles T. McIlhinney, Jr.	Republican	2007 – 2019		Pennsylvania State Representative for the 143rd district from 1997 to 2006
Steve Santarsiero	Democratic	2019–present		Pennsylvania State Representative for the 31st district from 2009 to 2017

== Recent election results ==
PA Senate election, 2022
Party	Candidate	Votes	%
Democratic	Steve Santarsiero (incumbent)	77,720	58.6
Republican	Matthew McCullough	54,975	41.4
Total votes		132,695	100.0
Democratic hold			

PA Senate election, 2018
Party	Candidate	Votes	%
Democratic	Steve Santarsiero	67,438	52.5
Republican	Marguerite Quinn	60,935	47.5
Total votes		128,373	100.0
Democratic gain from Republican			

PA Senate election, 2014
Party	Candidate	Votes	%
Republican	Chuck McIlhinney (incumbent)	49,605	58.7
Democratic	Stephen Cickay	34,967	41.3
Total votes		84,572	100.0
Republican hold			

PA Senate election, 2010
Party	Candidate	Votes	%
Republican	Chuck McIlhinney (incumbent)	57,349	59.8
Democratic	Cynthia Philo	38,509	40.2
Total votes		95,858	100.0
Republican hold			
