= David Heckler =

American politician & judge (born 1947)

David W. Heckler

District Attorney of Bucks County
- In office January 4, 2010 – September 2, 2016
- Preceded by: Michelle Henry
- Succeeded by: Matthew Weintraub

Member of the Pennsylvania Senate from the 10th district
- In office November 22, 1993 – August 31, 1997
- Preceded by: Jim Greenwood
- Succeeded by: Joe Conti

Member of the Pennsylvania House of Representatives from the 143rd district
- In office January 6, 1987 – November 22, 1993
- Preceded by: Jim Greenwood
- Succeeded by: Joe Conti

Personal details
- Born: March 7, 1947 (age 79) Abington, Pennsylvania
- Party: Republican
- Education: Yale University (BA); University of Virginia (LLB)

David W. Heckler (born March 7, 1947) is an American politician and judge from Pennsylvania who served as a Republican member of the Pennsylvania State Senate for the 10th district from 1993 to 1997.

== Early life and education ==
Heckler was born in Abington, Pennsylvania and graduated from Yale University and the University of Virginia Law School.

== Career ==
Heckler served as a member of the Pennsylvania House of Representatives for the 143rd district from 1987 to 1993. He served as a member of the Pennsylvania Senate for the 10th district from 1993 to 1997.

After leaving the state senate, he was elected Judge of the Pennsylvania Court of Common Pleas for Bucks County including as President Judge from 2004 to 2008.

In 2009, Heckler left the court and was elected District Attorney of Bucks County, and re-elected in 2013. Heckler resigned in 2016, and was succeeded by then Chief of Prosecution Matt Weintraub.

Pennsylvania House of Representatives
Preceded by James C. Greenwood	Member of the Pennsylvania House of Representatives from the 143rd district 1987–1993	Succeeded by Joe Conti
Pennsylvania State Senate
Preceded by James C. Greenwood	Member of the Pennsylvania State Senate from the 10th district 1993–1997	Succeeded by Joe Conti
Legal offices
Preceded by Michelle Henry	District Attorney of Bucks County; 2010–2016	Succeeded by Matthew Weintraub
