= Chuck McIlhinney =

American politician (born 1967)

Charles T. McIlhinney Jr.
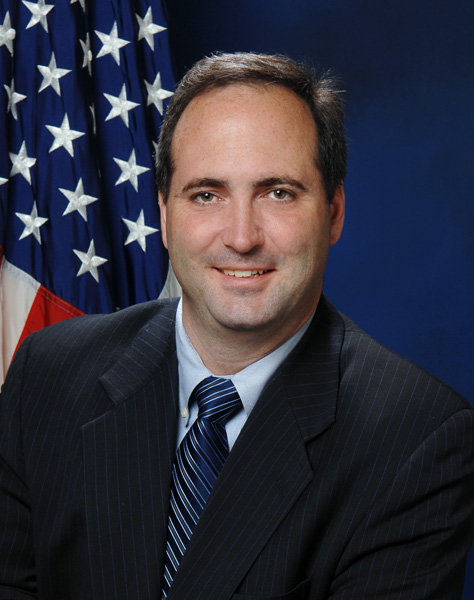

Member of the Pennsylvania Senate from the 10th district
- In office January 2, 2007 – 2019
- Preceded by: Joe Conti
- Succeeded by: Steve Santarsiero

Member of the Pennsylvania House of Representatives from the 143rd district
- In office January 7, 1997 – November 30, 2006
- Preceded by: Joe Conti
- Succeeded by: Marguerite Quinn

Personal details
- Born: May 19, 1967 (age 59)
- Party: Republican
- Spouse: Jennifer McIlhinney
- Education: University of Phoenix, Bryant College

Charles T. McIlhinney Jr. (born May 19, 1967) is a Republican former member of the Pennsylvania State Senate, representing the 10th District from 2007 to 2019. Previously, he was a member of the Pennsylvania House of Representatives from 1998 through 2006.

== Biography ==
McIlhinney attended La Salle College High School, graduating in 1985, before earning a degree in finance from Bryant College in 1989. He is working towards an MBA from the University of Phoenix.

He was on the borough council of Doylestown, Pennsylvania from 1994 to 1996. He also served as Director of the Bucks County Office of Employment and Training.

He won election to the Pennsylvania House of Representatives in a special election on February 3, 1998.

McIlhinney announced in January 2018 that he would retire from the state senate when his term expired in early 2019.
