= Eben Hillyer =

American southern doctor

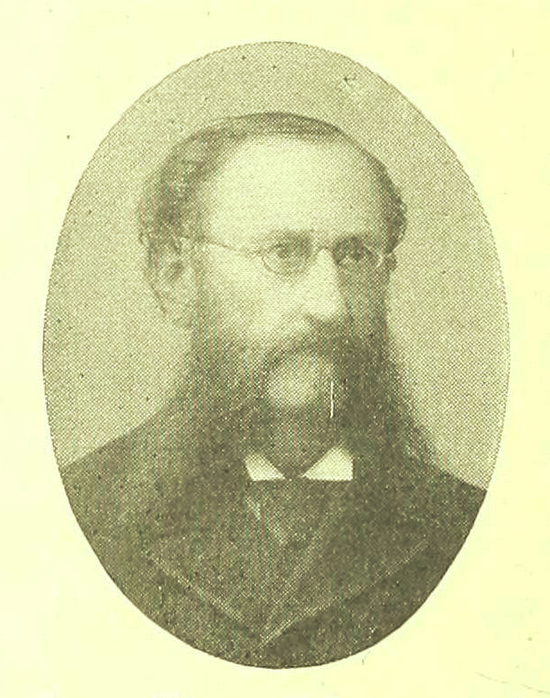
Eben Hillyer

Eben Hillyer (August 12, 1832 – December 20, 1910) was a physician of the American South. Born during the Antebellum period, he was a representative of one of the old and influential families of Georgia, which state was always his home. He served as professor in the institutes of medicine at the Atlanta Medical College (now Emory University School of Medicine) and was also president of the Rome Railroad.

== Early life and education ==
Eben Hillyer was born in Athens, Georgia, August 12, 1832. His parents were Junius and Jane Selina (Watkins) Hillyer, the former born in Wilkes County, Georgia, April 23, 1807, and the latter in Greene County, Georgia, May 17, 1807. All four great-grandfathers of Eben were patriot soldiers in the American Revolutionary War, namely: Dr. Asa Hillyer, Thomas Watkins, Joel Early and Capt. John Freeman. George Walton, a great-uncle of Eben, was one of the signers of the Declaration of Independence, and Peter Early, governor of Georgia during the War of 1812, was also a great-uncle, as was Robert Watkins, one of the prime factors in formulating the state government of Georgia and in the writing of its first constitution. Junius Hillyer was a man of distinction in his day and generation and honored the state of Georgia by his life and service. He served on the bench of the superior court, was a member of Congress two terms and was solicitor of the United States treasury in Buchanan's Administration.

Eben secured his preliminary or literary education in Athens and Penfield, Georgia, and was graduated in Jefferson Medical College (now Thomas Jefferson University), of Philadelphia, as a member of the class of 1854.

== Career ==
=== American Civil War ===
When the Civil War started, Hillyer promptly entered the service of the Confederacy, becoming surgeon with the rank of Major. He was assigned to duty as surgeon of the Eighth and Thirty-second Mississippi regiments, Lowery's brigade, Cleburne's division, and was present at the Battle of Resaca, Battle of Cass Station, Battle of New Hope Church, Battle of Dallas, the siege of Atlanta, the battles of July 21 and 22, 1864, at that point, and also the engagements at Jonesboro and Dalton, Georgia ; Decatur and Selma, Alabama, and Spring Hill and Franklin, Tennessee. He was made president of the army medical board in the Tennessee campaign of the Western Army, and retired from the service only when the cause of the Confederacy was finally lost. He remained in service until after the last of the wounded from the battle of Selma, Alabama, had received proper attention, and was thus on active duty until June, 1865.

=== Post-war career ===
After the close of the war, Hillyer resumed the active practice of his profession in the city of Atlanta, where for a number of years, he served as professor of institutes of medicine in the Atlanta Medical College. In 1867, he returned to Rome, where he engaged in the practice of his profession and also identified himself with agricultural interests.

In 1875, he was made president of the Rome Railroad, which position he retained for thirteen years, in connection with which he was identified with the executive control of other railroad systems to which the Rome line was attached.

For a number of years, he was retired from active professional and business associations.

== Personal life ==
Hillyer was a stanch supporter of the cause of the Democratic party, but he never permitted his name to be used in connection with a candidacy for political office.

He became a member of the Baptist church in June, 1855, and was zealous in its work and support.

On July 29, 1857, he married Miss Georgia E. Cooley, daughter of Hollis Cooley. They had two daughters: Ethel and Mabel.

He was a member of the Georgia Historical Society, and of the Veterans of the Confederate war. When the reunion met in his town, he opened up his home and prepared for fifteen old soldiers.

Eben Hillyer died in Rome, Georgia, December 20, 1910.
