= Joe Conti =

American politician (born 1954)

Joseph Conti

Chief Executive Officer of the Pennsylvania Liquor Control Board
- In office December 13, 2006 – February 2, 2013

Member of the Pennsylvania Senate from the 10th district
- In office November 24, 1997 – November 30, 2006
- Preceded by: David Heckler
- Succeeded by: Charles McIlhinney

Member of the Pennsylvania House of Representatives from the 143rd district
- In office November 22, 1993 – November 30, 1996
- Preceded by: David Heckler
- Succeeded by: Charles McIlhinney

Personal details
- Born: May 13, 1954 (age 72) Doylestown, Pennsylvania, U.S.
- Party: Republican
- Spouse: Molli
- Education: Penn State University

Joseph Conti (born May 13, 1954) is an American politician from Pennsylvania who served as a Republican member of the Pennsylvania House of Representatives for the 143rd district from 1993 to 1996 and the Pennsylvania Senate for the 10th district from 1997 to 2006. He was formerly the chief executive officer of the Pennsylvania Liquor Control Board and was appointed to that newly created position on December 13, 2006. He currently works as the President of the Pennsylvania Association of Broadcasters.

== Early life and education ==
Conti was born in Philadelphia to Walter and Patricia Conti. He graduated from Central Bucks West High School in 1972. He received a B.A. from Pennsylvania State University in 1976 and a M.A. in 2000.

== Career ==
He was elected township supervisor of Doylestown Township, Pennsylvania in 1984 and served until 1993. He was first elected to represent the 143rd district in the Pennsylvania House of Representatives on November 2, 1993. On November 4, 1997, he was elected to the Senate in a special election. He represented the 10th senatorial district in the Pennsylvania State Senate from 1997 through 2006. He was Republican Caucus Chairman and chaired the Senate Law and Justice Committee, which was oversaw the PLCB.

He owned two Bucks County, Pennsylvania restaurants from 1976 through 1999. Conti is now a faculty member of the Fels Institute of Government.
