= Ner Middleswarth =

American politician (1783–1865)

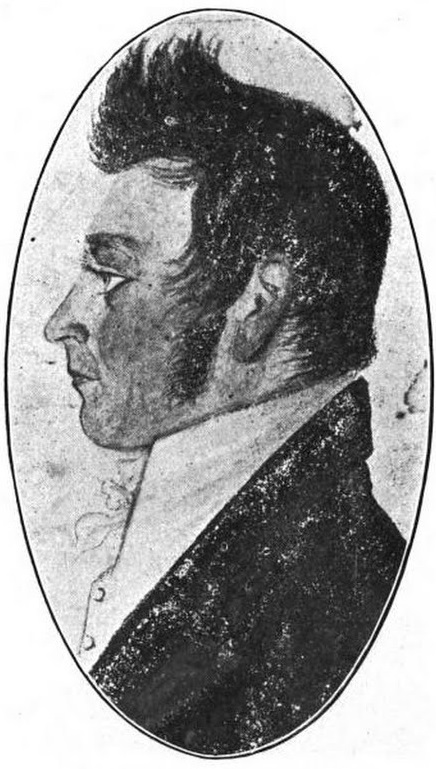
Middleswarth as a captain in the War of 1812. From 1906's History of Beaver Springs, Penn'a and Centennial Souvenir Book.

Ner Middleswarth (December 12, 1783 – June 2, 1865) was an American politician from New Jersey who served as a Whig member of the U.S. House of Representatives for Pennsylvania's 10th congressional district from 1853 to 1855. He served as a member of the Pennsylvania State House of Representatives from 1815 to 1841 including two terms as speaker of the house. He also served as a member of the Pennsylvania Senate for the 15th district from 1853 to 1854.

== Early life ==
Middleswarth was born on December 12, 1783, in New Jersey, of Dutch ancestry, the son of John and Martha (Reed) Middleswarth. He was baptized 12 April 1745 in Somerset County, New Jersey. John Middleswarth served as a Quartermaster Sergeant for Colonel Sylvanus Seely's regiment in the New Jersey militia during the American Revolution. John Middleswarth was from the Van Middleswaert family, who came from the Netherlands to New Amsterdam to Flatbush and then moved to Somerset, New Jersey in the 1690s. The Dutch used a Patronymic naming system and took the first name of the father, and made it the last name. Teunis Nyssen, the ancestor who came to America from Ultrecht, Binnick, Netherlands, used Nyssen or DeNys. His son Jan Teunis Nyssen baptized 1654 used a last name of Teunison and eventually the surname Van Middleswart.

In 1792, Middleswarth moved with his parents to Northumberland County, Pennsylvania. He grew up on this farm with his brother Abraham, and his four sisters-Mary, Martha, Rachel and Rebecca. Indians would visit the spring near their home to cure their meat and game. Ner had only three months of formal schooling. He was self-taught in both the English and Pennsylvania German languages and spoke both fluently. He grew up to be a strong 200-pound man, filled with a strong sense of duty to his friends and neighbors. He married Christine Schwartzkop and raised a family of twelve children.

== Public service ==
In 1812, Ner Middleswarth raised a company of Volunteers and entered the war of 1812 as captain, attached to the Pennsylvania Riflemen. Again in 1814, he raised another company which was attached to General Thomas McCall Cadwalader's Division, commanded by Colonel Uhl during the Niagara campaign.

At the completion of his military service in 1815, Middleswarth was elected to the Pennsylvania House of Representatives. He was re-elected for thirteen terms during the period of 1815-1842 in the Legislature. During his tenure, he was named as Speaker of the House in 1828 and 1836. He was elected to the Pennsylvania State Senate, for one term, and from 1853 to 1855 he was a member of the United States House of Representatives from Pennsylvania's 10th congressional district. He was a Whig, and later a Republican.

In 1858, he served as an Associate Judge of the county. This was his final role as a public servant.

== Final years ==
Ner was quite successful in business outside of government. He lost a great deal of his wealth, however, on a failed iron business called "Beaver Furnace" near Paxtonville, Pennsylvania. Middleswarth died at the age of 81 on June 2, 1865. He is buried with his wife Christina Schwartzkop at Beavertown Cemetery in Beavertown, Snyder County, Pennsylvania.

== See also ==
- Speaker of the Pennsylvania House of Representatives

== Notes ==
- Snyder County Pa Historical Society, volume I, page 81 and 82
- "Hon. Ner Middleswarth, written by his grandson Ner B Middleswarth

== Sources ==
- United States Congress. "Ner Middleswarth (id: M000695)". Biographical Directory of the United States Congress.
- The Political Graveyard

Pennsylvania House of Representatives
Preceded by	Member of the Pennsylvania House of Representatives; 1815-1841	Succeeded by
Political offices
Preceded by Joseph Ritner	Speaker of the Pennsylvania House of Representatives; 1828-1829	Succeeded by Frederick Smith
Preceded by James Thompson	Speaker of the Pennsylvania House of Representatives; 1836	Succeeded by Lewis Dewart
Pennsylvania State Senate
Preceded by Robert Allison McMurtrie	Member of the Pennsylvania Senate, 15th district 1853-1855	Succeeded by John Creswell, Jr.
U.S. House of Representatives
Preceded by Milo M. Dimmick	Member of the U.S. House of Representatives from Pennsylvania's 10th congressional district 1853–1855	Succeeded by John Christian Kunkel
