= Anne Hampton Brewster =

American journalist

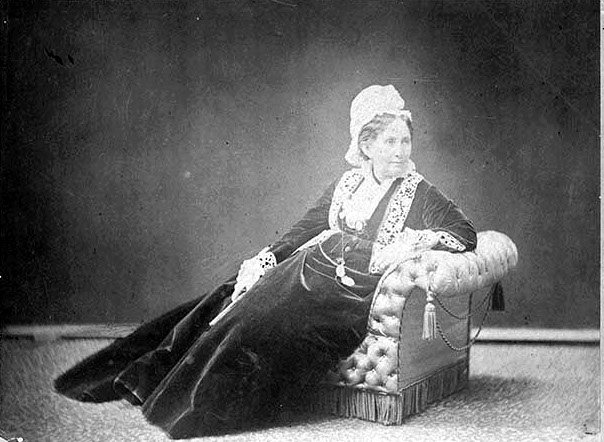
- in 1874
- Born: October 29, 1818; Philadelphia, Pennsylvania, U.S.
- Died: April 1, 1892 (aged 73); Siena, Kingdom of Italy
- Occupations: Writer, poet
- Partner: Charlotte Cushman

Anne Maria Hampton Brewster (October 29, 1818 – April 1, 1892) was one of America's first female foreign correspondents, publishing primarily in Philadelphia, New York and Boston newspapers. She also published novels, poems, and numerous short stories.

She was a "social outlaw" (as a friend described her) by refusing to marry; converting to Catholicism; moving out of the house of her older brother Benjamin H. Brewster (who later served as United States Attorney General in the 1880s) in order to live alone; moving to Rome; and by continuing to write through it all, first as a dilettante and then as a self-supporting professional. Brewster had a very close relationship with Charlotte Cushman but she forced herself to break away, although she regretted it years later.

Brewster died in Siena, Italy on April 1, 1892, and left her writings and books to the Library Company of Philadelphia.

She also used the pen name of Enna Duval (Enna being Anne in reverse) for work published between 1845 and 1860.

== Early and family life ==
Brewster was born in Philadelphia, Pennsylvania, on October 29, 1818, to Maria Hampton and Francis Enoch Brewster, the second child of three. She was known to be a feminist and social outlaw because she was an independent woman who did not want to marry. Instead of getting married and having a family, she preferred to write in order to support herself. She later left to go to Rome, Italy and wrote on many Italian topics such as: Art, architecture, archaeology, political events, and social gossip for many different American newspapers. All throughout her life, Anne continued to write having published a total of three novels, seven pieces of nonfiction, 52 short stories, and four poems, along with many newspaper articles. Anne had wishes to leave all of her works to the Library Company of Philadelphia, but she had a special wish that her "Library and everything appertaining to it... Be kept intact and called The Maria Hampton Brewster Library... In Honour of the memory of my beloved Mother." Anne died in 1893 and The Library Company has recognized her wishes and kept all of her works intact through a special accessioning procedure.

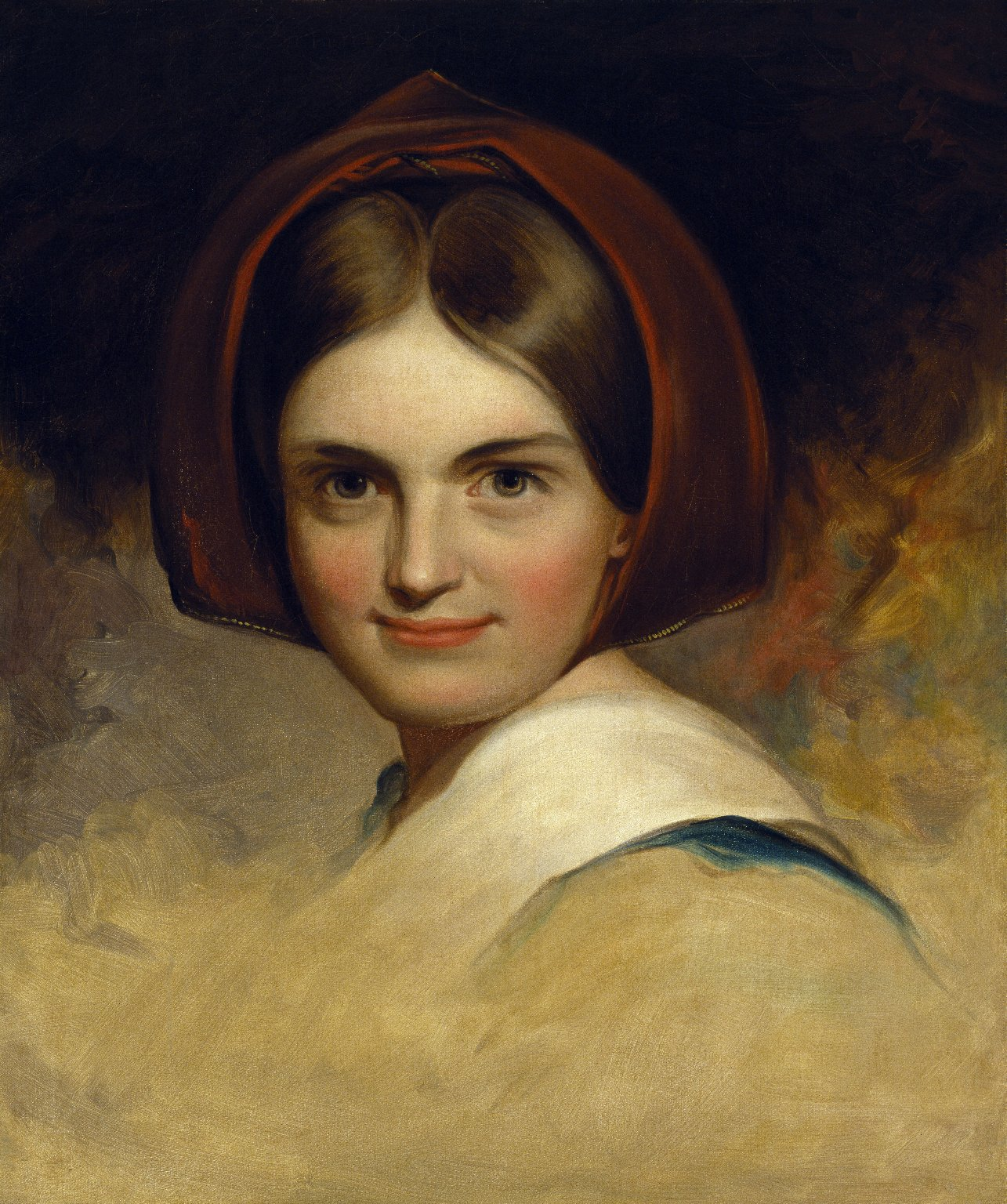
Brewsters very close friend Charlotte Cushman who her brother prevented her from seeing. Brewster kept this painting of her by Thomas Sully and left it in her will.

Anne was the daughter of Maria and Francis Brewster. They had three children together; Benjamin, Anne, and Carroll. At the age of five, older brother Benjamin was caught in a fire and severely burned in the face and hands. People around Philadelphia knew him as "Burnt Face" Brewster. Although Benjamin faced tragedy early on in his life, he still was a very successful individual. He became the most prominent Attorney General in the Cabinet of President Arthur. Third and youngest child to Maria and Francis Brewster was F. Carroll Brewster. She also became a very prominent lawyer well known for criminal cases. Aside from being an outstanding lawyer, she had many constitutional authority, author of some important treaties on law and equity, a common pleas judge, and Attorney General of the Commonwealth. Carroll was also a very successful individual. Francis, her father, was a deputy sheriff of the county and also an outstanding lawyer. Anne's father was not faithful to her mother. He had a mistress by the name of Isabella Anderson, whom he left Maria for in 1834. Francis and Isabella had two sons together, which are named Frederick and Enoch Brewster. Due to Anne's father leaving and not continuing to support Anne and her mother Maria, they had to depend on the support of Anne's older brother Benjamin. Benjamin controlled her close friends. She was very close to the writer Charlotte Cushman around 1844 but social pressure meant that they had to part. Brewster reminisced about this idyllic time together in letters in 1849. She eventually left a portrait of Cushman as a bequest to the Library of Philadelphia.

When Anne's mother, Maria, died in 1853, Maria left her entire estate to Anne in agreement with Anne's father that she could give away any pre-marriage items as she pleased. Anne's father died a year later in 1854 and broke the agreement that was made by leaving his entire estate and Maria's belongings to his sons that he had with Isabella. Benjamin eventually convinced the two sons to share the belongings with him. This left Anne's share in the hands of Benjamin. Anne tried to fight her brother for years in court but in the end she lost and her inheritance was kept by Benjamin. Her 1860 novel involves a close relationship between the narrator and another woman.

== Career ==
Anne Hampton Brewster's work consisted of books, diaries, notes/letters, articles, and journals. Many of her articles come from the time she spent in Rome writing for American Newspapers. They were published in American newspapers such as the Philadelphia Evening Bulletin, the Bother Advertiser, and the New York World. Her short stories, such as St. Martins Summer and others, were written for magazines such as Blackwood's. Her letter recipients consisted mainly of Thomas Buchanan Read (painter/poet), Amelia B. Edwards (author and archaeologist), Grace Greenwood (pseudonym), and Benjamin Brewster (her brother). The diaries on file go from 1845 to 1892. Annes published papers include a section with documents signed by Abraham Lincoln, W. T. Sherman, James Madison, and others.

During her twenty-four years in Rome, Brewster witnessed the gradual unification of Italy and the influx of thousands of American artists, who sought inspiration from Italy's storied sites and landscapes. The record of her publications proves that, as a tireless correspondent, the reach of her curiosity was extensive. She wrote about the worlds of art and culture, including around-the-clock, detailed accounts of the latest productions and lives of artists, as well as the performances of musicians. She wrote exhaustively for a wide variety of American newspapers, including the Philadelphia Evening Bulletin, the Daily Evening Telegraph (Philadelphia), the Boston Daily Advertiser, the Chicago Daily News, the New York World, and the Newark Courier. She also befriended archaeologies, including Rodolfo Lanciani (1845-1929), who alerted her to discoveries before they were officially made public. As a result, she became one of the first people in the modern era to see the newly discovered Hellenistic Seated Boxer, which may have been displayed at the Baths of Constantine but was carefully buried in late antiquity. She was also one of the first to study the Sarcophagus of Larthia Sciantia (3rd century BCE), a masterpiece of Etruscan art, shortly after it had been found in Chiusi and brought to Rome for analysis. Brewster conveyed not only the facts of her discoveries to the American public but also her unvarnished excitement at seeing these masterpieces with her own eyes.

Poetry was also something that Anne was a fan and writer of, although her poems aren't as well known as her other works. The Saturday Gazette was filled with many poems written by Anne but published under many different pen names. The various poems have no manuscript copies that can be found. The only proof of a poem that the Library Company owns is the poem "Up The Nile" by Joaquin Miller that has another version written by Anne Brewster. The poem illustrates a man fixation on earthly endeavors and shortfall of spirituality.

== Partial bibliography ==
- Spirit Sculpture; Or, the Year Before Confirmation (1849) (novel) (as Enna Duval)
- Compensation; Or, Always a Future (1860) (novel) (2nd edition 1870)
- Saint Martin's Summer (1866) (novel)
