= Emma Crow =

American writer

Emma Crow (April 3, 1839 – September 15, 1920) was an American author, notable for her lesbian relationship with actress Charlotte Cushman, whose nephew she was persuaded to marry in order to camouflage their relationship.

== Early life ==
Crow was born April 3, 1839, in St. Louis, Missouri. She was the daughter of Wayman Crow, a businessman, politician, philanthropist, and founder of Washington University in St. Louis, and Isabella Buck Conn. She had three sisters: Cornelia Carr, Mary Emmons, and Isabella Kealhofer as well as one brother, Wayman Crow Jr.

== Career ==
Emma Crow did not pursue her career until later in life when she wrote two books. The first, Insight; a Record of Psychic Experiences: a Series of Questions and Answers Dealing with the World of Facts, and the World of Ideas and the World of Realities Among Death, was published in 1918 and the second, Shadows in the Glass, was published in 1920.

== Personal life ==
Emma Crow met actress Charlotte Cushman in St. Louis, Missouri in 1858. Cushman had come to St. Louis for a two week engagement where she planned to meet Emma’s father, her friend Harriet Hosmer's patron, in order to receive financial advice. Emma saw Cushman as Romeo in Romeo and Juliet and wrote in her diary that she was the “incarnation of the ideal lover”, even though Cushman was twenty-two years her senior. Emma’s father introduced the two women shortly after and for the remainder of Cushman’s engagement Emma stayed in her company. Together they took long rides in the afternoons along the Mississippi and visited in Cushman’s dressing room before her performances. By the time the two weeks were up Cushman was calling Emma her “little lover”. However, Cushman was already “married” to another woman with the same first name, Emma Stebbins. In order to keep Emma (Crow) close to her and her “wife’s” jealousy at bay, Cushman encouraged Emma (Crow) to marry her nephew and adopted son, Ned Cushman. Although Emma’s father was initially hesitant, Cushman convinced him of Ned’s competence and Emma and Ned were married on April 3, 1861. Emma had five boys with Ned: Wayman Crow Cushman, Allerton Seward Cushman, Edwin Charles Cushman, Victor N. Cushman, and Guy Cushman. However, their marriage couldn’t compete with the passion Emma felt for Cushman as they continued to exchange loving letters until Cushman’s death.

== Death ==
Emma Crow Cushman died of pneumonia on September 15, 1920 in Bar Harbor, Maine. She is buried at the Mount Auburn Cemetery in Cambridge, Massachusetts along with her husband and two of her sons.
