= Senator Street =

Senator Street may refer to:

- Milton Street (1939–2022), Pennsylvania State Senate
- Sharif Street (born 1974), Pennsylvania State Senate
- William C. Street (1816–1893), Connecticut State Senate

== See also ==
- Senator Streeter (disambiguation)
