= George Lear =

American politician (1818–1884)

- Aged 60

Attorney General of Pennsylvania
- In office December 7, 1875 – February 26, 1879
- Governor: John F. Hartranft
- Preceded by: Samuel E. Dimmick
- Succeeded by: Henry Wilbur Palmer

Personal details
- Born: February 16, 1818 Warwick Township, Bucks County, Pennsylvania
- Died: May 23, 1884 (aged 66) Doylestown, Pennsylvania
- Spouse: Sydney White
- Children: 3
- Profession: Attorney, banker

George Lear (February 16, 1818 – May 23, 1884) was a Doylestown, Pennsylvania lawyer and banker, who served as state attorney general.

== Life and career ==
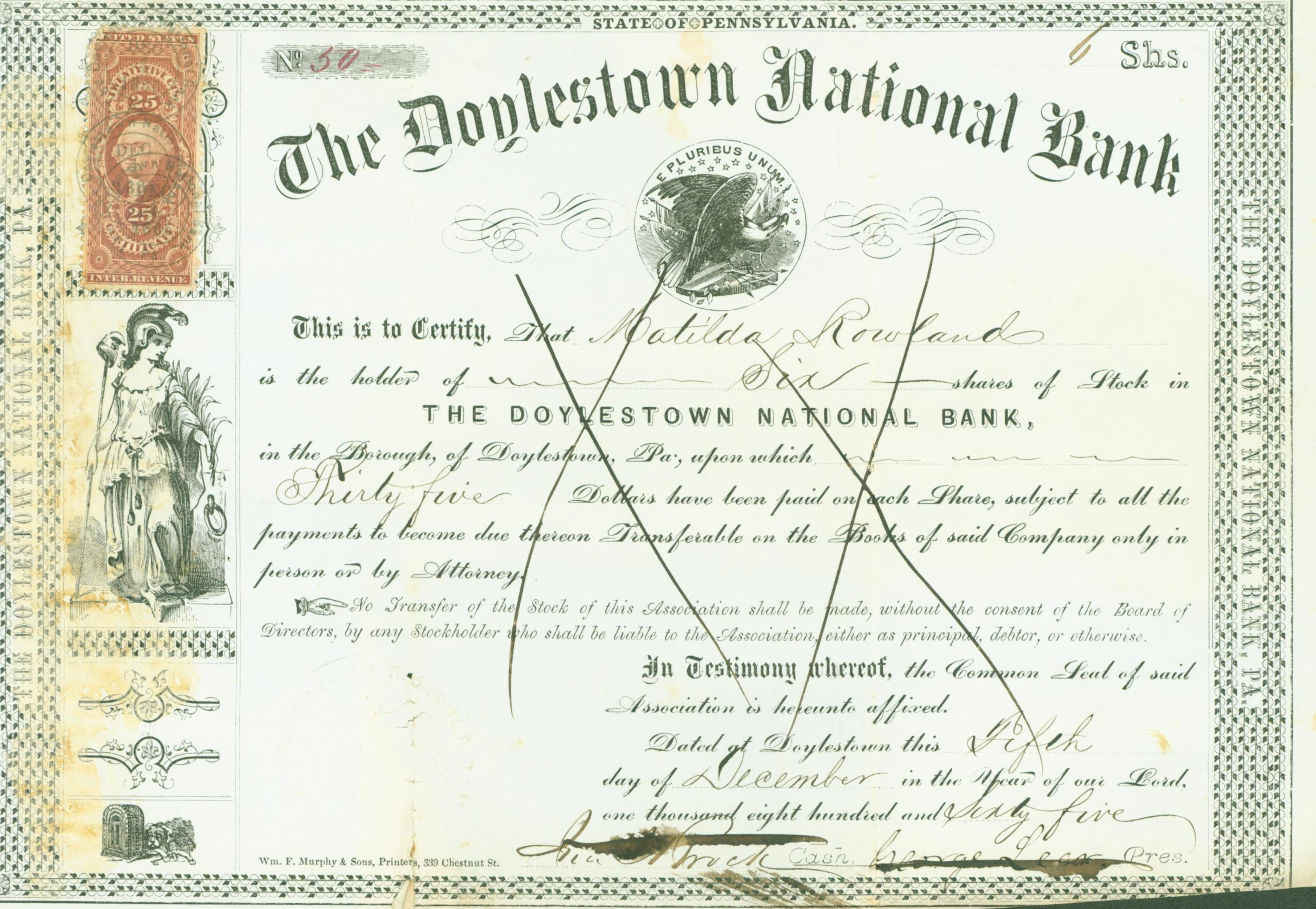
Share of the Doylestown National Bank, issued 5. December 1865, signed by George Lear

Lear was the son of Robert Lear, a farmer, and his wife Mary (Meloy) Lear, both from Bucks County. He initially worked as a teacher and store clerk, but also studied law, mostly on his own, and was admitted to Bucks County bar in 1844. He stumped for Polk-Dallas in the 1844 election. He was appointed the county's Deputy Attorney General in 1848, which he stayed at until the position was superseded by an elected District Attorney.

In 1845 Lear married Sydney White. They had three children, Henry, Cordelia and Mary. Henry would become a lawyer.

In 1865, Lear was appointed president of the Doylestown National Bank, which position he kept until his death. His son Henry was his successor.

Lear was a leading participant in the state's 1872–73 constitutional convention. In 1875, he was appointed state attorney general, which he served until 1879.

Lear died at home in 1884, and was buried in the Doylestown cemetery.

Legal offices
Preceded by Samuel E. Dimmick	Attorney General of Pennsylvania; 1875–1879	Succeeded by Henry Wilbur Palmer
