= Margaret H. George =

American politician (1928–2021)

Member of the Pennsylvania House of Representatives from the 143rd district
- In office January 4, 1977 – November 30, 1980
- Preceded by: John Renninger
- Succeeded by: Jim Greenwood

Personal details
- Born: April 5, 1928 Chester, Pennsylvania
- Died: July 2, 2021 (aged 93) Doylestown, Pennsylvania
- Party: Democratic

Margaret ('Peg') Hewitt George (April 5, 1928 – July 2, 2021) was an American author and Democratic member of the Pennsylvania House of Representatives.

== Early life and education ==
Born in Chester, Pennsylvania on April 5, 1928, Margaret Hewitt was a daughter of Charles H.S. Hewitt and Margaret Wright. She graduated from Prospect Park High School in 1945 and earned her Bachelor of Arts degree from Ursinus College in 1949.

On August 26, 1950, she married Glenn Franklin George (1927–2005); they had two sons, one daughter, and four granddaughters, and lived in Doylestown, Bucks County, Pennsylvania.

== Political life ==
George was the first woman and first Democrat on the local school board, being named as the director of the Pennsylvania Department of Education's Office of State and Federal Relations.

From 1977 until 1980, George served in the Pennsylvania House of Representatives as the first woman and only Democrat to have represented her legislative district (Bucks County, 143rd District).

== Writing career ==
George was the author or editor of several books including:

- 2004: Never use your dim lights; not even in the fog: a political journey. Writers Room. 2004. ISBN 978-0-9747191-1-5. - a fictional account of George's life in politics.
- 2006 We knew we were at war: women remember World War II. M.H. George. 2006. ISBN 978-0-9777944-0-9. - A compilation of 42 stories told to George by women who lived through World War II.

== Death ==
Preceded in death by her husband in 2005, George died at the age of ninety-three in Doylestown on July 2, 2021.
