= Rome Railroad =

Overview
- Headquarters: Rome, Georgia
- Locale: Georgia
- Dates of operation: 1848–1896
- Successor: Nashville, Chattanooga and St. Louis Railway

Technical
- Track gauge: 4 ft 8 1/2 in (1,435 mm) standard gauge
- Previous gauge: 5 ft (1,524 mm), converted to 4 ft 9 in (1,448 mm) in 1886

This 5 ft (1,524 mm) gauge railroad was first chartered as the Memphis Branch Railroad and Steamboat Company of Georgia in 1839. This company built a 20-mile (32 km) line between Rome, Georgia and Kingston where it connected with the Western and Atlantic Railroad. The name was changed to the Rome Railroad in 1850.

In spite of this, the railroad was often referred to as the Rome and Kingston Railroad in both the 1860 Census and during the Civil War. This railroad was acquired by the Nashville, Chattanooga and St. Louis Railway in 1896 who finally abandoned it in 1943.

== Notable people ==
- Eben Hillyer (1832-1910), physician; president, Rome Railroad
