= Junius Hillyer =

American politician (1807–1886)

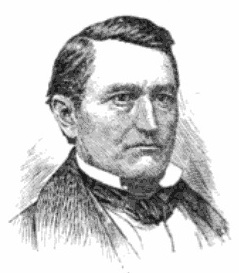

Member of the U.S. House of Representatives from Georgia's 6th district
- In office March 4, 1851 – March 3, 1855
- Preceded by: Howell Cobb
- Succeeded by: Howell Cobb

Solicitor of the United States Treasury
- In office 1857 – February 13, 1861 (resigned)

Judge of the Superior Courts of Georgia's Western Circuit
- In office 1841–1845

Solicitor General of the Western Judicial Circuit of Georgia
- In office 1834–1841

Personal details
- Born: April 23, 1807 Wilkes County, Georgia, U.S.
- Died: June 21, 1886 (aged 79) Decatur, Georgia, U.S.
- Party: Union (1850); Democratic (1852)
- Spouse: Jane Selina (Watkins) Hillyer
- Relations: Ethel Hillyer Harris (granddaughter)
- Children: five sons (including Eben Hillyer and George Hillyer); three or four daughters
- Education: Franklin College
- Occupation: Lawyer and Judge

Junius Hillyer (April 23, 1807 – June 21, 1886) was an American lawyer, judge, and politician who served two terms in the United States Congress.

== Early years and education ==
Junius Hillyer was born in Wilkes County, Georgia, on April 23, 1807, the second son of Shaler and Rebecca (Freeman) Hillyer. His father died when Junius was fourteen, prompting his mother to move the family to Athens, Georgia. Junius attended Franklin College (later the University of Georgia) in Athens, graduating in 1828. He had studied the law during his senior year, and was admitted to the bar, one month after graduation from college. Hillyer began a law practice in Lawrenceville, Georgia, but returned to Athens after one year. It was a judicial circuit containing some of the best legal minds of antebellum Georgia, including T.R.R. Cobb and William Hope Hull (founders of the University of Georgia School of Law), Alexander H. Stephens (later Vice President of the Confederate States of America), as well as Robert Toombs (first Confederate States Secretary of State and Brigadier general). Hillyer maintained his law practice in Athens for nearly 20 years, before moving to Monroe, Georgia in 1848. After the Civil War, Hillyer moved to Decatur, Georgia, where he maintained a residence for the rest of his life.

== Judicial service ==
In 1834, at age 27, Hillyer was elected as the Solicitor General of the Western Judicial Circuit of Georgia. In 1836 and again in 1838 he was an unsuccessful candidate for Congress. In 1841 he became Judge of the Superior Courts of Georgia's Western Circuit. From 1841 to 1845, he presided as a circuit judge.

== United States House of Representatives ==
Initially elected to U.S. House of Representatives in 1850 as a Unionist, Hillyer was re-elected in 1852 as a Democrat, and he served from March 4, 1851, to March 3, 1855. In his second term Hillyer was chairman of the Committee on Private Land Claims.

== Later years and legacy ==
After his congressional career, Hillyer was appointed by President James Buchanan as Solicitor of the United States Treasury, and served from 1857 until February 13, 1861, when, as a result of Georgia's secession from the Union, he resigned his post and returned to Georgia. This marked the end of Hillyer's career in public service. For his remaining years he concentrated on the private law practice.

Hillyer served as a Trustee for the University of Georgia from 1844 to 1858; he also served as a Trustee for Mercer University.

Hillyer died at his home in Decatur, Georgia, on June 21, 1886 and was buried in Oakland Cemetery in Atlanta.

Junius Hillyer married the former Jane Selina Watkins in 1831. They had five sons, one of whom died at age 30 or 31 while the other four, including Eben Hillyer, obtained success in their respective fields, and either three or four daughters. One of his sons, George Hillyer, was a prominent Georgia politician who led a regiment in the Confederate States Army at the Battle of Gettysburg and later served in the state legislature, as a Judge, and as Mayor of Atlanta.

Junius Hillyer's interest in the economic growth of his boyhood home of Athens prompted him to invest, at an early age, in the Georgia Railroad and Banking Company, which was first chartered in 1833. It was the first railroad built in the state. The railroad eventually extended a line to a spot near the old Creek Indian village of Standing Peachtree.Because it was the end of the line, the community took on the name "Terminus". Several name changes later, Terminus became Atlanta.

U.S. House of Representatives
Preceded by Howell Cobb	Member of the U.S. House of Representatives from Georgia's 6th congressional district March 4, 1851 – March 3, 1855	Succeeded by Howell Cobb
Legal offices
Preceded by Farris B. Streeter	Solicitor of the United States Treasury; 1853-1858	Succeeded by Benjamin F. Pleasants
