= Wayman Crow =

American politician

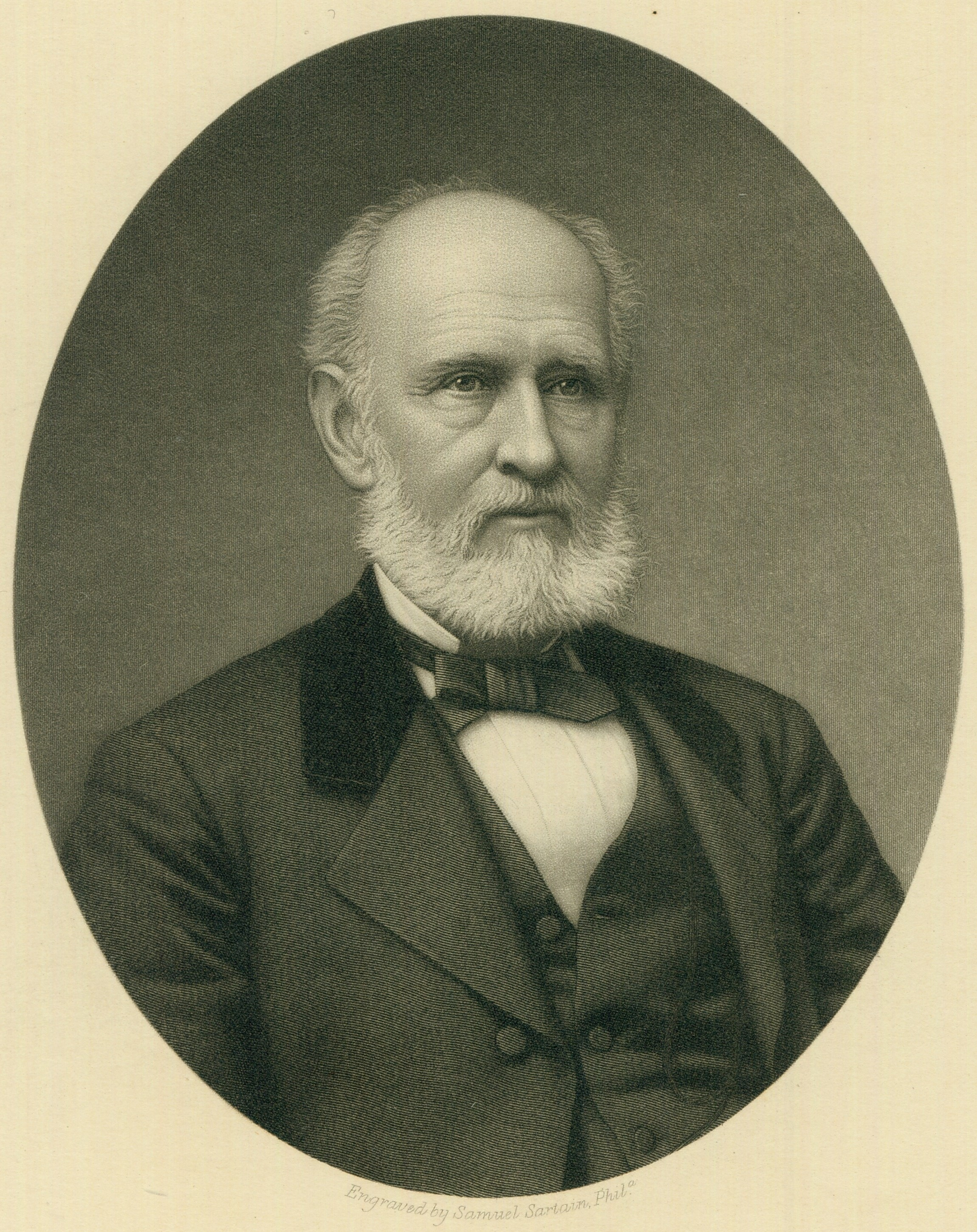
- Born: March 7, 1808; Hartford, Kentucky, U.S.
- Died: May 10, 1885 (aged 77); St. Louis, Missouri, U.S.
- Known for: Founder of Washington University

Signature
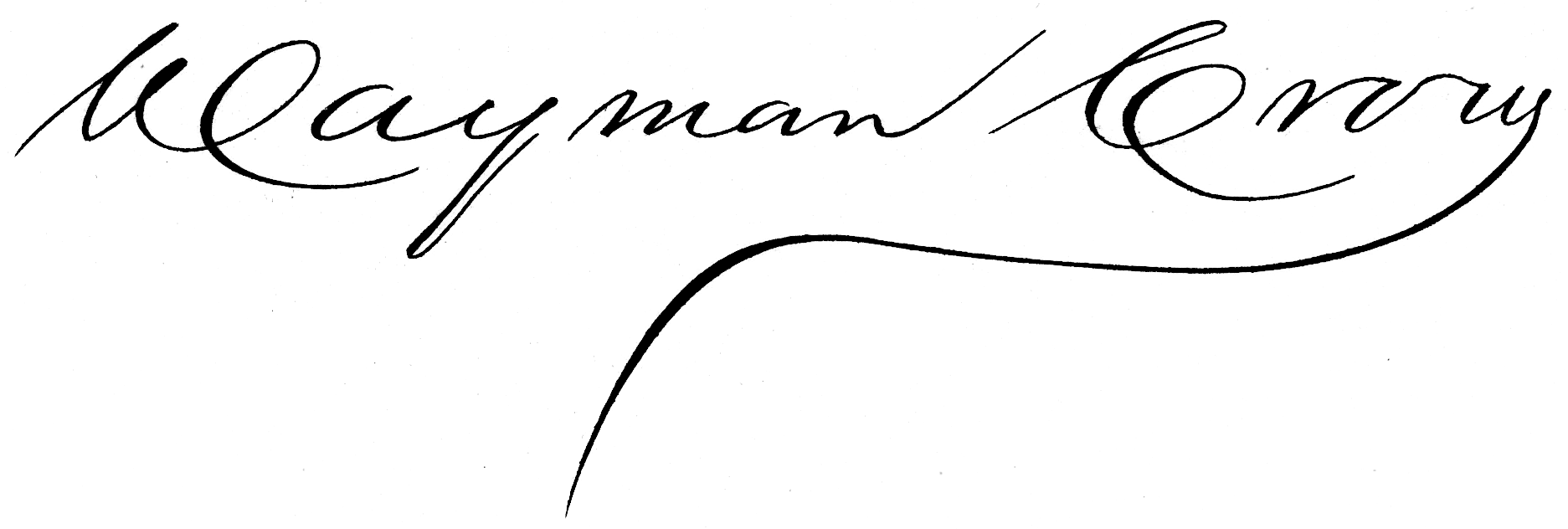

Wayman Crow (March 7, 1808 – May 10, 1885) was one of the founders of Washington University, a St. Louis businessman, and a politician.

== Early life ==
Born in Hartford, Kentucky, on March 7, 1808, Crow was the youngest of eight children. His parents, Joshua and Mary Wayman Crow, came to Kentucky from Maryland. Joshua practiced law until his death in 1830. Until Wayman was twelve, he attended the Hopkinsville, Kentucky country school. At that point, he became an apprentice to a dry goods storekeeper, Strother J. Hawkins.

== Business career ==
At Hawkins' store, Wayman learned bookkeeping and how to run a business while working at the store and sleeping on a cot there. Hawkins retired when Crow was fifteen and he moved to an apprenticeship at another firm, Anderson and Atterbury. After completing his apprenticeship, Crow was given responsibility for an entire store in Cadiz, Kentucky. Crow was given the opportunity to buy this business when Anderson and Atterbury moved to Pittsburgh. Crow then sold the business in 1835, amassing what was then a fortune of twenty thousand dollars.

Crow began looking for a place to settle farther north. However, he fell ill in St. Louis, Missouri, and was detained there. Crow decided to settle in the city, where, in 1835, he partnered with his cousin, Joshua Tevis in a business, Crow and Tevis. The business later became Crow, McCreery, and Company and was eventually called Crow, Hagardine, and Company. Crow was the head of this firm until he died.

== Political career ==
Crow became interested in local politics in St. Louis. In 1840, Crow was elected president of the Chamber of Commerce. In 1840, he was elected as a Whig to the Missouri State Senate and again in 1850. Crow helped in getting charters for the Hannibal and St. Joseph and Missouri Pacific Railroads. In 1846 he secured the charter for the St. Louis Mercantile Library Association, the oldest library west of the Mississippi River. Crow also helped in attaining a charter for the St. Louis Asylum for the Blind.

== Founding of Washington University ==
In 1853, while attending a legislative session in Jefferson City, Missouri, Crow drafted an act of incorporation for an institution of higher education that would eventually become Washington University in St. Louis. Crow initially called the school Eliot Seminary to honor his friend William Greenleaf Eliot. Eliot had no knowledge of this plan and was surprised to be named one of the incorporators, along with Crow and fifteen members of their Unitarian congregation. In 1854, the school was renamed Washington Institute, and three years later, the state legislature incorporated the school as Washington University. Crow donated a substantial amount of money to the school for scholarships, a chair of physics, and more than two hundred thousand dollars' worth of real estate.

In 1881, Crow also deeded the memorial he built upon the death of his son to the school as a fine arts school and museum. The building was dedicated as St. Louis School and Museum of Fine Arts and also called the Crow Memorial. The school educated two generations of St. Louis artists and craftspeople.

He continued his activities with the university and continued to be a member of the board of trustees until his death in 1885.

== Personal life ==
Crow married Isabella Conn in 1829. Isabella came from Union County, Kentucky. Isabella's sister married Crow's brother, Phillips Crow. Five of Wayman and Isabella's children lived to adulthood: Cornelia Carr, Mary Emmons, Emma Cushman, Wayman Crow Jr., and Isabella Kealhofer.

Emma Conn Crow was born in 1839 and died in 1920. Cornelia Louisa Crow Carr, was born in 1833 and died in 1922.

The couple's son, Wayman Crow Jr., died in England in 1878. Wayman built a memorial in downtown St. Louis to honor his son when he died. Crow employed Boston architects Peabody and Stearns to design the three-story Renaissance/Romanesque building located at 19th and Lucas Place (now Locust Street). The building was razed in 1919.

== Later life and death ==
Wayman Crow died on May 10, 1885, and Isabella died in 1892.
