= Edward L. Howard =

American politician

Member of the Pennsylvania Senate from the 10th district
- In office January 5, 1971 – November 30, 1986
- Preceded by: Martin Keller
- Succeeded by: Jim Greenwood

Personal details
- Born: November 25, 1926 Jacksonville, Florida, US
- Died: 4 January 2011 (aged 84) Doylestown, Pennsylvania, US
- Party: Republican
- Education: University of Minnesota

Edward Louis Howard (November 25, 1926 – January 4, 2011) was an American politician who served as a Republican member of the Pennsylvania State Senate for the 10th district from 1971 to 1986.

== Early life and education ==
Howard was born in Jacksonville, Florida. Soon after his birth, the family moved to Excelsior, Minnesota where he completed high school.

In 1944, he joined the U.S. Army. He worked as a military policeman in a unit preparing for the invasion of Japan until 1945. After his discharge from the military, he received a B.A. in History from the University of Minnesota.

In 1959, he moved to Doylestown, Pennsylvania to run the National Fiberstok Corporation. He eventually purchased the corporation and worked as president and CEO until 1986.

== Career ==
Howard was elected to the Pennsylvania Senate for the 10th district and served from 1971 to 1986. He served as chairman of the Senate Finance Committee.

He died in Doylestown, Pennsylvania.
