= Farris B. Streeter =

American politician

Member of the Pennsylvania Senate for the 10th district
- In office 1847–1850
- Preceded by: William Harrison Dimmick
- Succeeded by: Ephriam W. Hamlin

Solicitor of the United States Treasury
- In office 1853–1858
- Preceded by: Albert Constable
- Succeeded by: Junius Hillyer

Personal details
- Born: September 24, 1819 Harford Township, Pennsylvania, US
- Died: August 19, 1877 (aged 57)
- Party: Democratic

Farris B. Streeter (September 24, 1819 – August 19, 1877) was an American attorney, legislator and jurist from Pennsylvania who served as a Democratic member of the Pennsylvania Senate for the 10th district from 1847 to 1850 and as Solicitor of the United States Treasury from 1853 to 1858.

== Early life ==
Ferris B. Streeter was born in Harford Township, Pennsylvania on September 24, 1819. He attended Harford Academy and the Clinton Liberal Institute in Clinton, New York, afterwards becoming a teacher at Harford Academy.

== Post teaching career ==
Streeter studied law and was admitted to the bar in 1841, afterwards establishing a practice in Susquehanna County, Pennsylvania.

From 1843 to 1847 Streeter served as a deputy prosecuting attorney for Susquehanna County.

A Democrat, Streeter served in the Pennsylvania Senate for the 10th district from 1847 to 1850.

Streeter was appointed Solicitor of the United States Treasury in 1853, and served until 1858, resigning over disagreement with Franklin Pierce's policy on the admission of Kansas to the Union.

In 1859 Streeter was a Delegate to the Pennsylvania State Democratic Convention.

Having joined the Republican Party, in March, 1865 Streeter was appointed a Judge of the Pennsylvania District Court. He won successive reelections and served until his death in 1877.

Streeter died on August 19, 1877. He was buried at Montrose Cemetery in Montrose, Pennsylvania.

Pennsylvania State Senate
Preceded by William Harrison Dimmick	Member of the Pennsylvania Senate, 10th district 1847-1850	Succeeded by Ephriam W. Hamlin
Legal offices
Preceded by Albert Constable	Solicitor of the United States Treasury; 1853-1858	Succeeded by Junius Hillyer
