= William H. Dimmick =

American politician

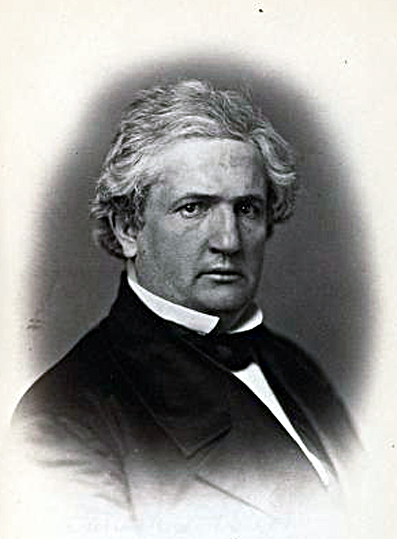
- William Harrison Dimmick, US Representative from Pennsylvania

Member of the U.S. House of Representatives from Pennsylvania's 13th district
- In office March 4, 1857 – March 3, 1861
- Preceded by: Asa Packer
- Succeeded by: Philip Johnson

Member of the Pennsylvania Senate for the 10th district
- In office 1845–1846
- Preceded by: John S. Gibbons
- Succeeded by: Farris B. Streeter

Personal details
- Born: December 20, 1815 Milford, Pennsylvania
- Died: August 2, 1861 (aged 45) Honesdale, Pennsylvania
- Party: Democratic

William Harrison Dimmick (December 20, 1815 – August 2, 1861) was an American politician from Pennsylvania who served as a Democratic member of the U.S. House of Representatives for Pennsylvania's 13th congressional district from 1857 to 1861.

== Biography ==
William H. Dimmick (brother of Milo Melankthon Dimmick) was born in Milford, Pennsylvania, the son of Dan Dimmick, a lawyer and Jane, daughter of Jacobus Josephus Aerts, also known as Dr. Francis J. Smith. He studied law, was admitted to the bar in 1835 and commenced practice in Bethany, Pennsylvania. He moved to Honesdale, Pennsylvania, in 1842 and continued the practice of law. He served as prosecuting attorney of Wayne County, Pennsylvania, in 1836 and 1837. He was a member of the Pennsylvania State Senate for the 10th district from 1845 to 1846.

Dimmick was elected as a Democrat to the Thirty-fifth and Thirty-sixth Congresses. He resumed the practice of law and died in Honesdale in 1861. Interment in Glen Dyberry Cemetery.

Dimmick's law partner was his younger cousin Samuel E. Dimmick, whom he trained in law. The two cousins ran as opponents in the 1856 election.

== Sources ==
- United States Congress. "William H. Dimmick (id: D000351)". Biographical Directory of the United States Congress.
- The Political Graveyard
- Another bio

Pennsylvania State Senate
| Preceded by John S. Gibbons | Member of the Pennsylvania Senate, 10th district 1845-1846 | Succeeded by Farris B. Streeter |
U.S. House of Representatives
| Preceded by Asa Packer | Member of the U.S. House of Representatives from Pennsylvania's 13th congressional district 1857–1861 | Succeeded by Philip Johnson |
