= Marvin Keller (politician) =

American politician (1906–1976)

Member of the Pennsylvania Senate from the 10th district
- In office January 6, 1959 – November 30, 1970
- Preceded by: Frank Ruth
- Succeeded by: Edward L. Howard

Member of the Pennsylvania House of Representatives from the Bucks County district
- In office 1949–1958

Personal details
- Born: Marvin V. Keller; September 19, 1906 Langhorne, Pennsylvania, US
- Died: October 19, 1976 (aged 70) Doylestown, Pennsylvania, US
- Party: Republican

Marvin V. Keller (September 19, 1906 – October 19, 1976) was an American politician from Pennsylvania who served as a Republican member of the Pennsylvania Senate for the 10th district from 1959 to 1970. He also served in the Pennsylvania House of Representatives for the Bucks County district from 1948 to 1957.

== Early life and education ==
Keller was born in Langhorne, Pennsylvania, to Walter H. and Bertha V. Keller. He was educated in the public schools and graduated from Rider College.

== Business career ==
He was a building contractor. He also worked as a director of the Newtown Title & Trust Company and as a director for the Langhorne Federal Saving and Loan Association.

== Political career ==
In 1943, he was elected Register of Wills. He served in the Pennsylvania House of Representatives for the Bucks County district from 1948 to 1957 and the Pennsylvania Senate for the 10th district from 1959 to 1970.

He died after a long illness in 1976.
