= Milo Melankthon Dimmick =

American politician

Milo M. Dimmick

Member of the U.S. House of Representatives from Pennsylvania's 10th district
- In office March 4, 1849 – March 3, 1853
- Preceded by: Richard Brodhead
- Succeeded by: Ner Middleswarth

Personal details
- Born: October 30, 1811 Milford, Pennsylvania, U.S.
- Died: November 22, 1872 (aged 61) Mauch Chunk, Pennsylvania, U.S.
- Party: Democratic

Milo Melankthon Dimmick (October 30, 1811 – November 22, 1872) was a Democratic member of the U.S. House of Representatives from Pennsylvania.

== Biography ==
Milo Melankthon Dimmick (brother of William Harrison Dimmick) was born in Milford, Pennsylvania. He pursued classical studies, studied law, was admitted to the bar in 1834 and commenced practice in Stroudsburg, Pennsylvania.

Dimmick was elected as a Democrat to the Thirty-first and Thirty-second Congresses. While a member of congress, he served a chairman of the United States House Committee on Expenditures in the Department of War during the Thirty-first and Thirty-second Congresses. He was not a candidate for renomination in 1852. He resumed the practice of law. He was an unsuccessful candidate for president judge of the twenty-second judicial district of Pennsylvania in 1853. He moved to Mauch Chunk, Pennsylvania in present-day Jim Thorpe, Pennsylvania, in 1853 where he continued the practice of law and also engaged in the banking business. He died there in 1872, and was buried in Mauch Chunk Cemetery.

== Sources ==
- United States Congress. "Milo Melankthon Dimmick (id: D000350)". Biographical Directory of the United States Congress.
- The Political Graveyard

U.S. House of Representatives
Preceded by Richard Brodhead	Member of the U.S. House of Representatives from Pennsylvania's 10th congressional district 1849–1853	Succeeded by Ner Middleswarth
