= John Renninger =

American politician

John S. Renninger

Member of the Pennsylvania House of Representatives from the 143rd district
- In office January 7, 1969 – November 30, 1976
- Preceded by: District Created
- Succeeded by: Margaret George

Member of the Pennsylvania House of Representatives from the Bucks County district
- In office 1965–1968

Personal details
- Born: October 10, 1924 Philadelphia, Pennsylvania
- Died: April 2, 2005 (aged 80) Newtown, Pennsylvania
- Party: Republican

John S. Renninger (October 10, 1924 – April 2, 2005) was a Republican member of the Pennsylvania House of Representatives.
