= John Gilmore (politician) =

American politician (1780–1845)

Member of the U.S. House of Representatives from Pennsylvania's 16th district
- In office March 4, 1829 – March 3, 1833
- Preceded by: See below
- Succeeded by: Joseph Biles Anthony

Member of the Pennsylvania House of Representatives
- In office 1816-1821

15th Treasurer of Pennsylvania
- In office 1841–1842

Personal details
- Born: February 18, 1780 Somerset County, Pennsylvania
- Died: May 11, 1845 (aged 65) Butler, Pennsylvania
- Party: Jacksonian

John Gilmore (February 18, 1780 – May 11, 1845) was a Jacksonian member of the U.S. House of Representatives from Pennsylvania.

== Biography ==
John Gilmore (father of Alfred Gilmore) born in Somerset County, Pennsylvania. He moved with his parents to Washington, Pennsylvania, in 1780. He studied law, was admitted to the bar in 1801 and commenced practice in Washington. He moved to Butler, Pennsylvania, in 1803. He was appointed deputy district attorney for Butler County, Pennsylvania, in 1803. He was a member of the Pennsylvania House of Representatives from 1816 to 1821 and served as speaker in 1821.

Gilmore was elected as a Jacksonian to the Twenty-first and Twenty-second Congresses. He was elected State treasurer by the legislature of Pennsylvania in 1841. He died in Butler in 1845. Interment in North Cemetery.

== See also ==
- Speaker of the Pennsylvania House of Representatives

== Sources ==
- United States Congress. "John Gilmore (id: G000222)". Biographical Directory of the United States Congress.
- The Political Graveyard

U.S. House of Representatives
Preceded by James S. Stevenson; Robert Orr, Jr.	Member of the U.S. House of Representatives from Pennsylvania's 16th congressional district 1829–1833 1829 alongside : William Wilkins; 1829–1833 alongside: Harmar Denny	Succeeded by Joseph B. Anthony
Political offices
Preceded by Almon H. Reed	Treasurer of Pennsylvania; 1845–1847	Succeeded by James Ross Snowden
