= Samuel Stout =

Samuel Stout may refer to:

- Sam Stout (born 1984), Canadian mixed martial artist
- Samuel Hollingsworth Stout (1822–1903), American farmer, slaveholder, teacher and surgeon
- Samuel Van Dyke Stout (1786–1850), American politician, mayor of Nashville, Tennessee
