= Magnus Miller Murray =

American politician

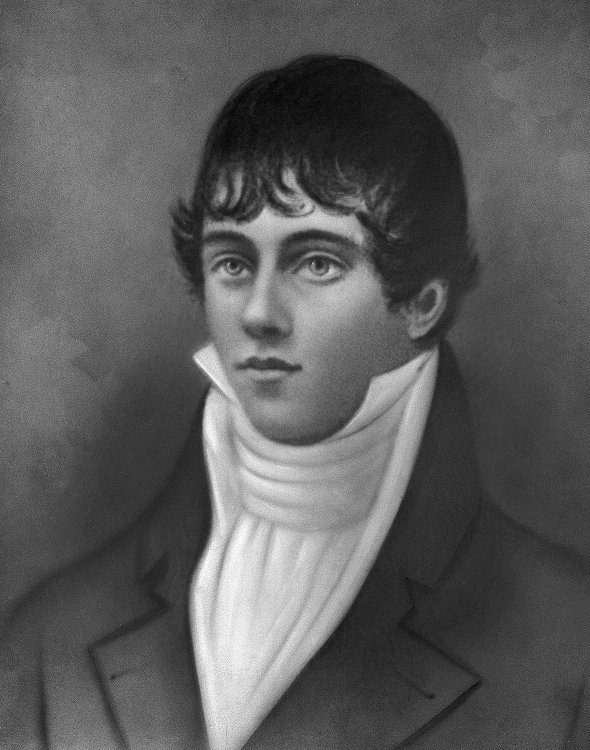
- Portrait of Magnus Miller Murray, c. 1828–1832

4th & 6th Mayor of Pittsburgh
- In office 1831–1832
- Preceded by: Matthew B. Lowrie
- Succeeded by: Samuel Pettigrew
- In office 1828–1830
- Preceded by: John M. Snowden
- Succeeded by: Matthew B. Lowrie

Personal details
- Born: February 22, 1787 Philadelphia, Pennsylvania
- Died: March 4, 1838 (aged 51)
- Resting place: Allegheny Cemetery
- Spouse: Mary Wilkins
- Relations: Alexander Murray (father); William Wilkins (uncle)
- Children: James Butler Murray

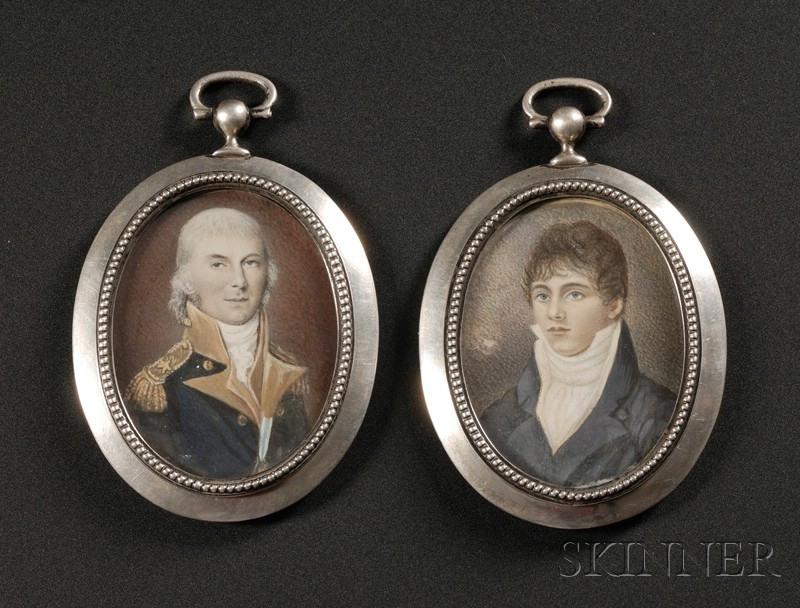
Magnus Miller Murphy (R) with his father (L)

Magnus Miller Murray (February 22, 1787 – March 4, 1838), served as the mayor of Pittsburgh, Pennsylvania, from 1828 to 1830 and again from 1831 to 1832. Mayor Murray now rests in Section 19, Lot 29 of Allegheny Cemetery.

== Early life ==
Murray was born in Philadelphia, to Commodore Alexander Murray and Mary Miller Murray. He was named after his maternal grandfather, Magnus Miller, a local merchant. He attended the University of Pennsylvania, earning both bachelor's and master's degrees. On January 6, 1806 he was admitted to the Philadelphia Bar. He married Mary Wilkens, daughter of John Wilkins, Jr. and Catherine Reagan Murray, on February 23, 1810.

== Pittsburgh politics ==
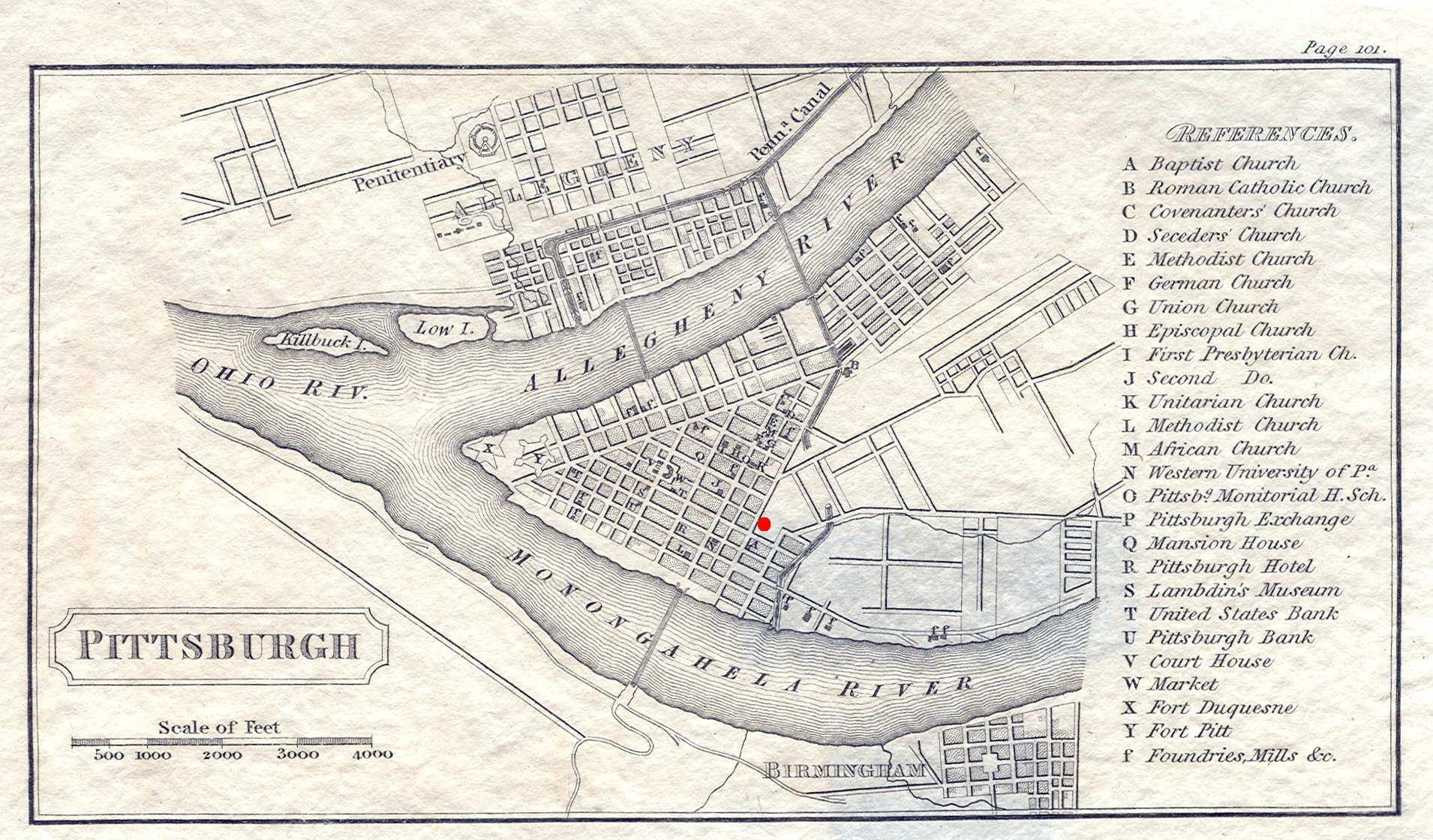
Pittsburgh in 1828

Murray began politics as an understudy to his uncle, area judge and political insider William Wilkins.

Under Murray's mayoral administration, the Western Terminus of the Pennsylvania Canal was completed along the Grant Street corridor of the city. Murray was the first of a handful of Pittsburgh mayors to serve two non-consecutive terms in office, having to cede control of the mayor's office to Matthew B. Lowrie from 1830 to 1831, before regaining his mayoral powers.

== Honors ==
Murray's son, James Butler Murray, President of the First Exchange Bank of Pittsburgh is remembered in the naming of Murray Avenue in Pittsburgh's Squirrel Hill neighborhood.

== Membership ==
Member of The Society of the Cincinnati as the oldest male heir of Commodore Alexander Murray.

== Other ==
His daughter, Julia N. Murray, married politician John V. Le Moyne. Murray is an ancestor of actress Julie Bowen.

== See also ==
- List of mayors of Pittsburgh

Preceded by John M. Snowden	Mayor of Pittsburgh; 1828–1830	Succeeded by Matthew Lowrie
Preceded by Matthew Lowrie	Mayor of Pittsburgh; 1831–1832	Succeeded by Samuel Pettigrew
