= Walter Lowrie =

Walter Lowrie may refer to:

- Walter Lowrie (politician) (1784–1868), teacher, farmer, and politician from Butler County, Pennsylvania
- Walter H. Lowrie (1807–1876), Pennsylvania jurist
- Walter Lowrie (author) (1868–1959), Episcopal clergyman, author, and biographer
