= USS Norfolk (1798) =

Brig in the United States Navy

History

United States
- Name: USS Norfolk
- Laid down: 1798
- Commissioned: 9 September 1798
- Fate: Sold, November 1800

General characteristics
- Type: Brig
- Displacement: 200 long tons (203 t)
- Propulsion: Sails
- Complement: 140 officers and enlisted
- Armament: 18 × 6-pounder guns

The first USS Norfolk was a brig in the United States Navy during the Quasi-War with France.

Norfolk was built by the city of Norfolk, Virginia for the public service at the beginning of the Quasi-War with France in 1798. Captain Thomas Williams was appointed to the command and she was reported ready for sea, except for her other officers, on 9 September 1798.

== Service history ==
Captain Alexander Murray, commanding Montezuma, was advised that Norfolk was to be included in the little squadron under his command. Ordered to sail for the West Indies for the purpose of destroying French armed vessels and protecting American commerce, Montezuma, Norfolk, and Retaliation (Lt. William Bainbridge in command), sailed from Norfolk 25 October.

On the cruise south Retaliation was captured by two French frigates. Montezuma and Norfolk, after recapturing a large schooner off Guadalupe, which had been captured by the French, put in at Antigua. Thereafter Norfolk cruised near St. Kitts.

Norfolk joined Commodore Truxtun's squadron and 20 January 1799 the Commodore ordered Captain Williams to join him at Basseterre, St. Kitts. Norfolk sailed northward with a convoy of merchant ships 6 March, and proceeded to Philadelphia.

Master Commandant William Bainbridge was ordered to relieve Captain Williams 29 March and to refit the ship for sea as soon as possible. Norfolk then sailed to St. Kitts to join Truxtun's squadron; she arrived Basse-terre Roads 17 May and was subsequently ordered to Commodore Thomas Tingey's Squadron. In company with Ganges 16 June Norfolk captured the French privateer Vainqueur off Guadeloupe.

Norfolk arrived New York 14 August with French prisoners. After extensive repairs, she was ordered to the West Indies again 16 September, cruising on the San Domingo Station and later in the vicinity of Havana, actively protecting American commerce and opening island ports to American trade. On 7 November she captured a French sloop/cutter "Le Garda Le Pelican" that had just been captured by a French flagged barge, of piratical nature, the barge was captured by Boston. About 22 February, 1800 she forced ashore the French privateer schooner "Beauty" at Point Jaco, Cuba with her side shelled to pieces. She sailed from Havana 3 April 1800 with a number of merchant ships under convoy, arriving Philadelphia 12 April.

Lt. Thomas Calvert took command of Norfolk 29 April, and on 20 May she was ordered to convoy vessels to Cartagena and then to take up station with the squadron at San Domingo. Norfolk sailed in June and en route encountered two French privateers, but both escaped, one after a half hour's fight in which Lt. Calvert was seriously wounded. On 19 July she fought a battle with one of the privateers, a schooner, 8 Leagues south east of St Maartens. Later, in company with Boston, Norfolk captured a small cutter sloop. Lt. Calvert was ordered by Commodore Murray 2 August to take under convoy vessels from Cartagena and Cape St. Nicole Mole and proceed with them to the coast of North America, after which, due to Norfolk's poor condition, he sailed to Baltimore.

Benjamin Stoddert, the Secretary of the Navy, ordered Lt. Calvert to pay off the crew of Norfolk 21 October, to remove her stores and furnishings, and to prepare her for sale. Norfolk was subsequently sold, probably in November 1800.
