= William Marks =

William Marks may refer to:

- William Marks (politician) (1778–1858), American lawyer, U.S. Senator for Pennsylvania
- William Marks (Latter Day Saints) (1792–1872), American early religious leader in the Latter Day Saint movement
- William J. Marks, spokesperson for the U.S. Defense Intelligence Agency
