= Matthew B. Lowrie =

American mayor

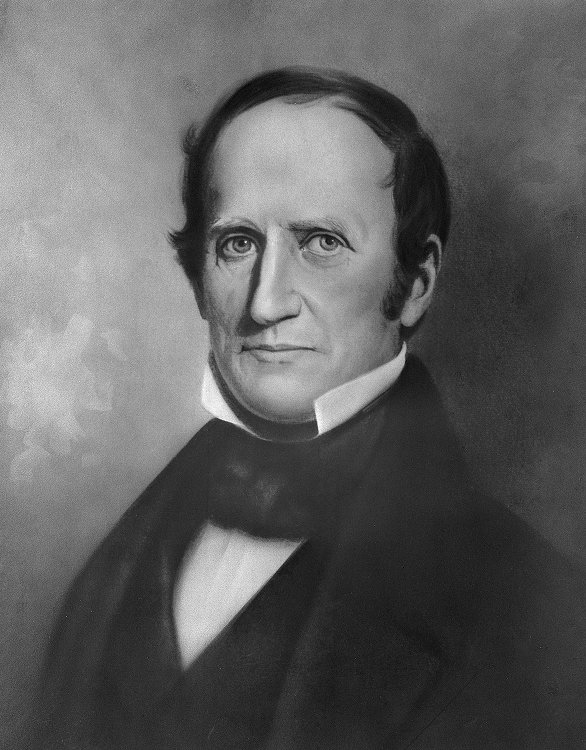
- Portrait of Matthew B. Lowrie, c. 1830–1831

5th Mayor of Pittsburgh
- In office 1830–1831
- Preceded by: Magnus Miller Murray
- Succeeded by: Magnus Miller Murray

Personal details
- Born: May 12, 1773 Edinburgh, Scotland
- Died: July 28, 1850 (aged 77)
- Party: Anti-Masonic
- Relations: Walter Lowrie (brother)
- Children: Walter H. Lowrie

Mathew B. Lowrie (May 12, 1773 – July 28, 1850), served as the Mayor of Pittsburgh from 1830 to 1831.

== Early life ==
Lowrie was born in Edinburgh, Scotland, from where he emigrated with his parents the U.S. state of to Pennsylvania. As a young man he came to Pittsburgh and started a thriving grocery business. Lowrie was also active in religion, serving many years as a Sunday school teacher at the First Presbyterian Church. His brother, Walter Lowrie, served in the United States Senate, and his son, Walter H. Lowrie, went on to become Chief Justice of the Pennsylvania Supreme Court.

== Pittsburgh politics ==
Mathew Lowrie was elected mayor in 1830 and is credited with "modernizing" the fire department.

The city bought its very first steam powered fire engine and named it the "citizen". Lowrie was also instrumental in managing the city's rapid growth by adopting the "ward" system of governance for the first time in western Pennsylvania.

== Later life ==
Lowrie died in 1850 after a bout with cholera, he is buried in Allegheny Cemetery and the site is marked by an obelisk.

== See also ==
- List of mayors of Pittsburgh

| Preceded by Magnus Miller Murray | Mayor of Pittsburgh; 1830–1831 | Succeeded by Magnus Miller Murray |
