= Battle of Fort Anderson =

Battle of the American Civil War

Coordinates: 35.1383°N 77.0358°W

- Part of the American Civil War
Date	March 13, 1863 – March 15, 1863
Location	Craven County, North Carolina
Result	Union victory

Belligerents
United States (Union)	(Confederate States of America) CSA (Confederacy)

Commanders and leaders
Hiram Anderson; Alexander Murray	Daniel H. Hill

Units involved
1st Division, XVIII Corps	Hill's Division

Strength
45,000	12,000

Casualties and losses
2 killed 4 wounded	2 killed 21 wounded

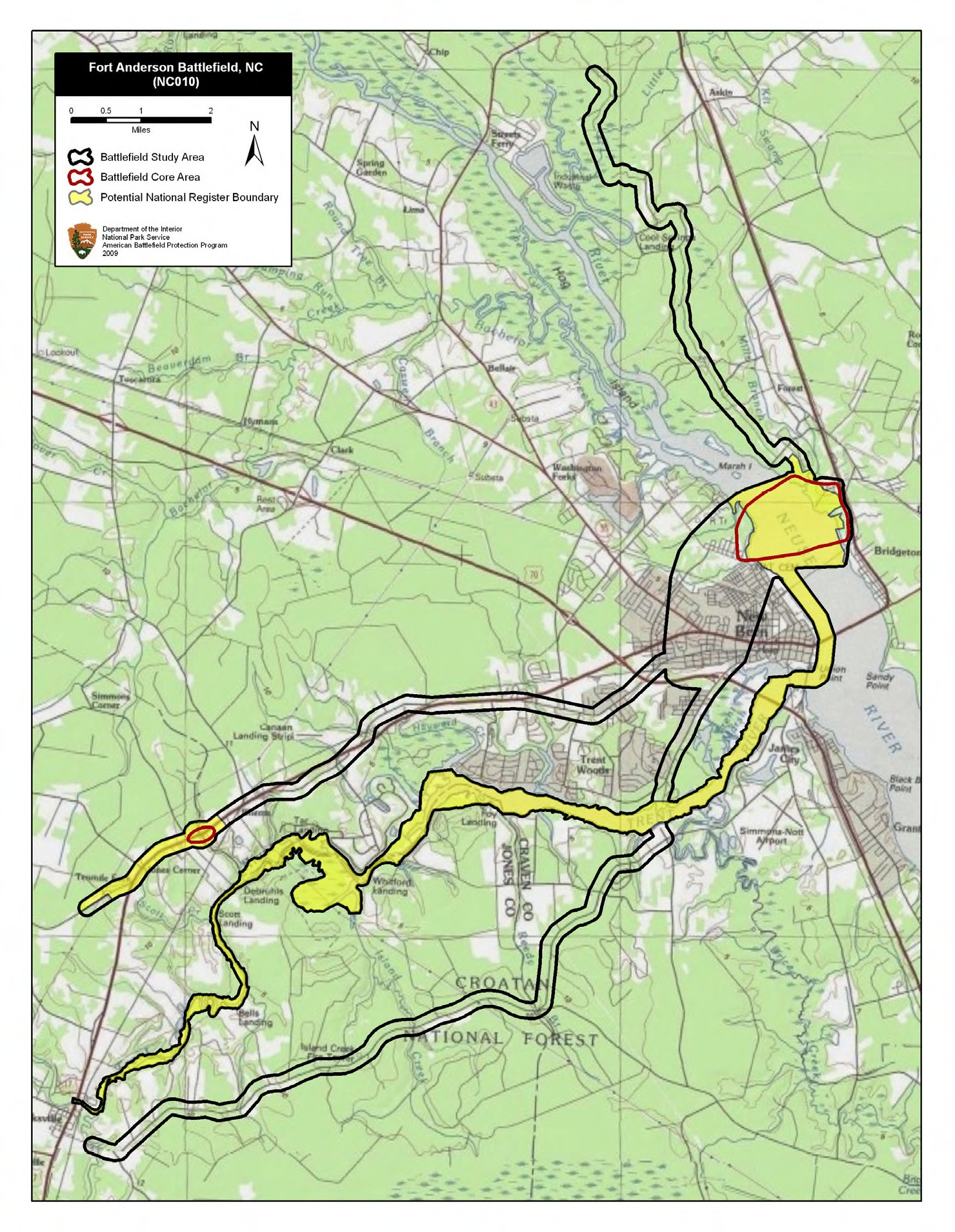
Map of Fort Anderson Battlefield core and study areas by the American Battlefield Protection Program.

The Battle of Fort Anderson, also known as the Battle of Deep Gully, took place March 13–15, 1863, in Craven County, North Carolina, as part of Confederate Lt. Gen. James Longstreet's Tidewater operations during the American Civil War.

Lt. Gen. Longstreet took charge of the Department of Virginia and North Carolina on February 25 and initiated his Tidewater Operations. He directed Maj. Gen. D.H. Hill, commander of the North Carolina District, to advance on the Union stronghold of New Bern with about 12,000 men. Maj. Gen. William H. C. Whiting, who commanded the Wilmington garrison, refused to cooperate. After initial success at Deep Gully on March 13, Hill sent Brig. Gen. J. Johnston Pettigrew against the well-entrenched Federals at Fort Anderson on March 14–15, the opposite side of the river from New Bern. Pettigrew was forced to retire upon the arrival of Union gunboats. The city's garrison was heavily reinforced, and Hill withdrew to threaten Washington, North Carolina.

After Gen. Pettigrew’s withdrawal, General Hill was forced to remove his troops from New Bern and head to Washington, NC. The mission was not a complete failure; General Hill was able to fill wagons with food supplies for the troops from areas that were not guarded by Union forces.
