= Samuel Hollingsworth Stout =

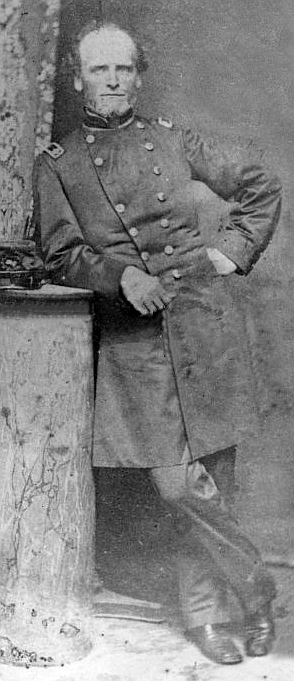
- Born: March 3, 1822; Nashville, Tennessee, U.S.
- Died: September 18, 1903 (aged 81); Clarendon, Texas, U.S.
- Education: Classical and Mathematical Seminary
- Alma mater: University of Nashville; University of Pennsylvania Medical School
- Occupations: Farmer, slaveholder, surgeon, teacher
- Spouse: Martha Moore Abernathy
- Children: 7
- Parent(s): Samuel Van Dyke Stout; Catherine Tannehill
- Relatives: John Wilkins, Jr. (maternal great-uncle); William Wilkins (maternal great-uncle); Wilkins F. Tannehill (maternal uncle)

Major Samuel Hollingsworth Stout (March 3, 1822 – September 18, 1903) was an American farmer, slaveholder, teacher and surgeon. In the Antebellum era, he was the owner of a farm with slaves in Giles County, Tennessee. During the American Civil War, he was a surgeon to the Army of Tennessee and later in charge of sixty hospitals for the Confederate States Army in Georgia, Alabama, and Mississippi. He later taught at the Atlanta Medical College (now known as the Emory University School of Medicine), and he practiced medicine in Texas.

== Early life ==
Samuel Hollingsworth Stout was born on March 3, 1822, in Nashville, Tennessee. His father, Samuel Van Dyke Stout, was the owner of a carriage factory and the mayor of Nashville. He had three brothers and one sister. He was raised as a Presbyterian.

Stout was educated at the Classical and Mathematical Seminary in Nashville. He graduated from the University of Nashville in 1839 with an A.B., and he earned an M.D. from the University of Pennsylvania's medical school in 1848.

== Career ==
Stout became a surgeon for the United States Navy but resigned as the American-Mexican War was coming to an end. Instead, he practiced medicine in Giles County, Tennessee, where he owned a farm with slaves. He also became an early member of the Tennessee Historical Society.

At the outset of the American Civil War, on May 17, 1861, Stout became a major of cavalry in the Confederate States Army. He was a surgeon to the Third Tennessee Infantry from May to November 1861, and to Gordon Hospital in Nashville from November 1861 to February 1862. He subsequently moved to Chattanooga, where he was in charge of hospitals for the Army of Tennessee. By the summer of 1864, his responsibilities had expanded to sixty Confederate hospitals in the Southern states of Georgia, Alabama, and Mississippi. By the end of the war, he had lost his Giles County farm.

Stout was a professor of surgery at the Atlanta Medical College, later known as the Emory University School of Medicine, from 1866 to 1867. He practised medicine in Georgia until 1882, when he moved to Cisco, Texas; he taught and practiced medicine in Dallas.

== Personal life and death ==
Stout married Martha Moore Abernathy in 1848. They had seven children. He died on September 18, 1903, in Clarendon, Texas.
