= Grand Master (Freemasonry) =

Masonic leader

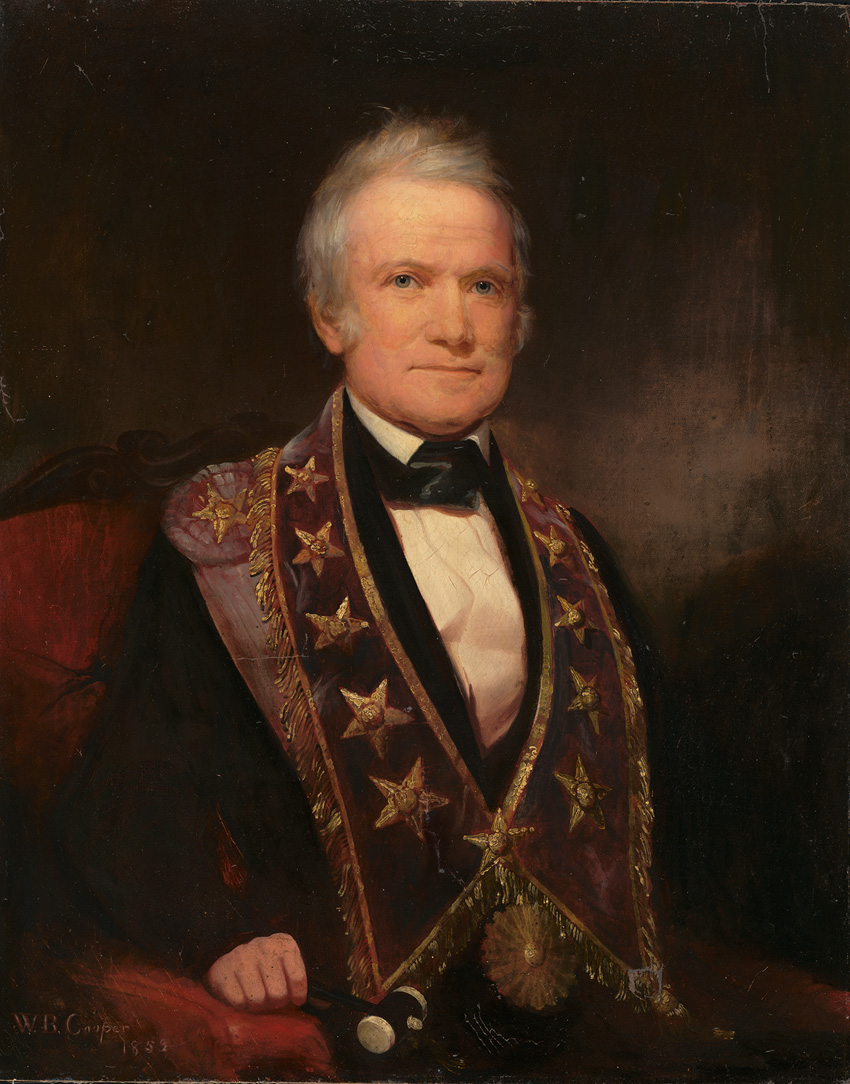
Wilkins F. Tannehill, Masonic Grand Master of Tennessee, in his regalia

Grand Master is a title of honour as well as an office in Freemasonry, given to a freemason elected to oversee a Masonic jurisdiction, derived from the office of Grand Masters in chivalric orders. He presides over a Grand Lodge and has certain rights in the constituent lodges that form his jurisdiction. In most cases, the Grand Master is styled "Most Worshipful Grand Master."

== Traditions ==
There are two distinct traditions in connection with the office of Grand Master. Generally speaking, the European practice is for the same Grand Master to be re-elected for several consecutive years, maybe even several decades, whilst in other countries, a Grand Master serves a set term of only one to three years and then retires.

In several European countries, the position of Grand Master has often been held by members of royal families or the high nobility. In Denmark, both Christian VIII and Frederik VII served as Grand Master while also serving as king. Such was also the case with Oscar II in Sweden.

=== United Grand Lodge of England ===
In the United Grand Lodge of England, which covers England and Wales, if the Grand Master is traditionally a Prince of the Blood Royal, that is a member of the Royal Family, he may appoint a 'Pro Grand Master' ('Pro' is from the Latin for 'for') to be "his principal adviser, and to act for him on those occasions when, due to royal engagements, he is unable to be present". The Pro Grand Master is distinct from the Deputy Grand Master.

Prince Edward, Duke of Kent was first elected Grand Master in 1967 and has been re-elected each year since.

=== Variants ===
Examples where a different title is used for Grand Master are the Grand Lodge of Pennsylvania, where the Grand Master is titled "Right Worshipful" as well as the Grand Lodge of Scotland, the role is titled "Grand Master Mason".

== Deputies ==
Just as the Worshipful Master of a Lodge annually appoints lodge officers to assist him, so the Grand Master of each Grand Lodge annually appoints Grand Lodge officers to assist him in his work. Grand Lodges often elect or appoint Deputy Grand Masters, sometimes also known as District Deputy Grand Masters, who can act on behalf of the Grand Master when he is unable to do so.

In the United Grand Lodge of England, the head of a Provincial Grand Lodge is titled as Provincial Grand Master.

== See also ==
- Grand Master (order)
