= DM-2 =

DM-2 may refer to:

- Blok D (Russian: Блок Д), an upper stage used on Soviet and later Russian expendable launch systems
- Crew Dragon Demo-2, the second demonstration flight—and first crewed flight—of Crew Dragon
- USS Murray (DD-97), a United States Destroyer later converted into a minelayer, DM-2
