= John M. Snowden =

American mayor (1776–1845)

- John Maugeridge Snowden

3rd Mayor of Pittsburgh
- In office 1825–1828
- Preceded by: John Darragh
- Succeeded by: Magnus Miller Murray

Personal details
- Born: January 13, 1776 Philadelphia, Province of Pennsylvania, British America
- Died: April 1, 1845 (aged 69) Pittsburgh, Pennsylvania, U.S.
- Party: Democratic-Republican, Democratic
- Spouse: Elizabeth Moor
- Relations: William Snowden (father)

John Maugridge Snowden (January 13, 1776 – April 1, 1845) served as Mayor of Pittsburgh City from 1825 to 1828.

== Early life ==
Snowden was born in Philadelphia, in the colonial-era Province of Pennsylvania, to a family of Revolutionary-era Patriots. His father, William Snowden, was a hero of the war, being imprisoned by the British forces and dying in their custody. His wife Elizabeth Moor, was a major advisor to General Washington during his Pennsylvania campaigns. In 1811 Snowden began a printing and book business in Pittsburgh. He eventually bought and edited his own newspaper, the Pittsburgh Mercury. Like his predecessor as mayor, John Darragh, he used his appointment as president of the Bank of Pittsburgh to launch his mayoral candidacy.

== Pittsburgh politics ==
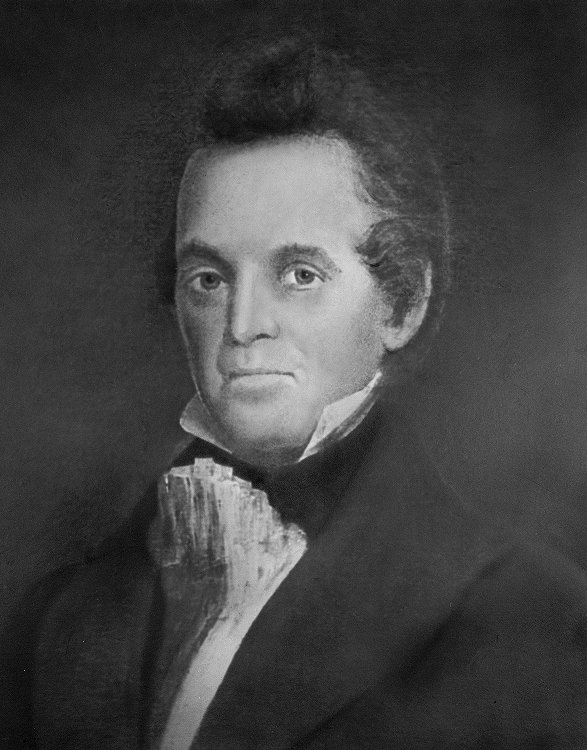
Portrait of John M. Snowden, c. 1825–1828

Snowden served terms as Allegheny County Recorder and Treasurer before being elected mayor of Pittsburgh in 1825. He served until 1828.

== Later life ==
Snowden died suddenly of heart disease on April 1, 1845, at his residence in Allegheny City, now Pittsburgh's North Side. He was buried at Concord Presbyterian Church on Brownsville Road, near his home there.

== Honors ==
Allegheny County's community Snowden (part of present-day South Park Township) was named for John Snowden.

== See also ==
- List of mayors of Pittsburgh

Preceded by John Darragh	Mayor of Pittsburgh; 1825–1828	Succeeded by Magnus Miller Murray
