= John Randolph Clay =

American diplomat (1808–1885)

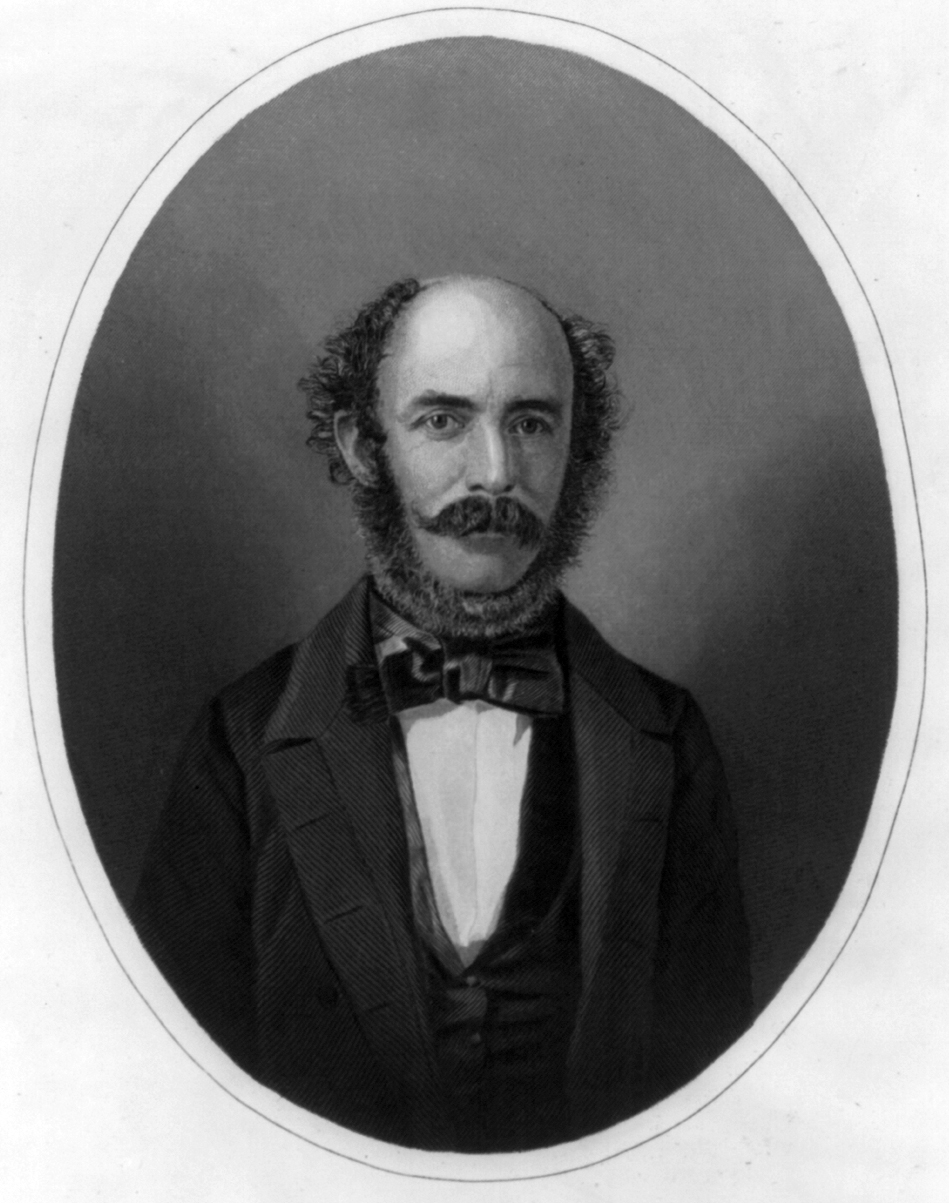
John Randolph Clay

John Randolph Clay (September 29, 1808 – August 15, 1885) was an American diplomat.

== Biography ==
Clay was born in Philadelphia, Pennsylvania in 1808, the second child of parents Joseph (1769–1811) and Mary Ashmead Clay (1782–1871) and younger brother of Joseph Ashmead Clay (1806–1881). He also had a younger sister Ann Eliza Clay (1810–1872). Clay was orphaned as a child, and was both brought up and taught by John Randolph of Roanoke. In May 1830 Randolph was appointed U.S. ambassador to Russia, and brought Clay along as his secretary. Still in Russia, he subsequently served as secretary to James Buchanan and William Wilkins. He would later serve in Austria as Henry A. P. Muhlenberg's secretary and then chargé d'affaires. From 1836 to 1837 he served as Chargé d'Affaires in Russia.

Afterwards, John Randolph Clay served in Lima, Peru as American Chargé d'Affaires from December 15, 1847 through August 22, 1853 and then as Envoy Extraordinary and Minister Plenipotentiary until October 27, 1860.

One of his accomplishments there is shown in the following that was written by William Lewis Herndon in his Exploration of the Valley of the Amazon, vol. I, (1852), chapter 19:

Independently of the action of the Spanish American republics concerning the free navigation of their tributaries of the Amazon, we have a special treaty with Peru, negotiated by J. Randolph Clay, our present minister, in July, 1851, which entitles us, under the present circumstances, to the navigation of the Peruvian Amazon. The second article of that treaty declares that, 'The two high-contracting parties hereby bind and engage themselves not to grant any favor, privilege, or immunity whatever, in matters of commerce and navigation, to other nations, which shall not be also immediately extended to the citizens of the other contracting party, who shall enjoy the same gratuitously, or on giving a compensation as nearly as possible of proportionate value and effect, to be adjusted by mutual agreement, if the concession shall have been conditional.
