= Joseph B. Anthony =

American politician (1795–1851)

Joseph Biles Anthony

Member of the U.S. House of Representatives from Pennsylvania's 16th district
- In office March 4, 1833 – March 4, 1837
- Preceded by: Harmar Denny; John Gilmore
- Succeeded by: Robert Hanna Hammond

Member of the Pennsylvania Senate for the 13th district
- In office 1830-1833
- Preceded by: Robert McClure
- Succeeded by: Henry Petrikin

Personal details
- Born: June 19, 1795 Philadelphia, Pennsylvania, U.S.
- Died: January 10, 1851 (aged 55) Williamsport, Pennsylvania, U.S.
- Party: Democratic

Joseph Biles Anthony (June 19, 1795 – January 10, 1851) was an American lawyer and politician from Pennsylvania who served as a Democratic member of the U.S. House of Representatives for two terms, representing Pennsylvania's 16th congressional district from 1833 to 1837.

== Life and career ==
Anthony was born in Philadelphia, Pennsylvania. He attended public schools and Princeton College. He studied law, was admitted to the bar and practiced law. He was a member of the Pennsylvania State Senate for the 13th district from 1830 to 1833.

=== Congress ===
Anthony was elected as a Jacksonian to the Twenty-third and Twenty-fourth Congresses.

== Later career and death ==
After leaving Congress, he was appointed judge of the ‘Nichelson court’, and engaged in the sale of titles to large tracts of lands in Pennsylvania. He was elected president judge of the eighth district in 1844 and served until his death in Williamsport, Pennsylvania.

== Notes ==
U.S. House of Representatives
Preceded by Harmar Denny; John Gilmore	Member of the U.S. House of Representatives from Pennsylvania's 16th congressional district 1833–1837	Succeeded by Robert Hanna Hammond
Pennsylvania State Senate
Preceded by Robert McClure	Member of the Pennsylvania Senate, 13th district 1830-1833	Succeeded by Henry Petrikin
