= USS Murray (DD-576) =

Fletcher-class destroyer

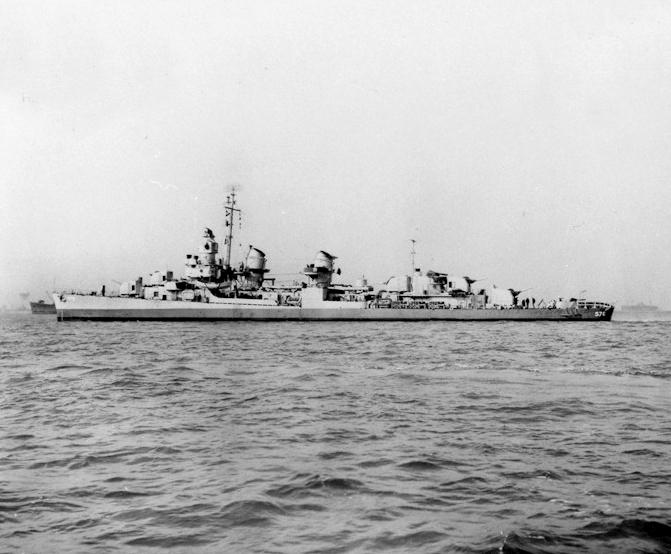

History

United States
- Name: Murray
- Namesake: Capt. Alexander Murray and his grandson Rear Adm. Alexander Murray
- Builder: Consolidated Steel Corporation, Orange, Texas
- Laid down: 16 March 1942
- Launched: 16 August 1942
- Commissioned: 20 April 1943 to 27 March 1946; 16 October 1951 to May 1966
- Fate: Sold for scrapping to Boston Metals Company, Baltimore, Maryland, in 1966

General characteristics
- Class & type: Fletcher-class destroyer
- Displacement: 2,050 tons
- Length: 376 ft 6 in (114.76 m)
- Beam: 39 ft 8 in (12.09 m)
- Draft: 17 ft 9 in (5.41 m)
- Propulsion: 60,000 shp (45,000 kW); 2 propellers
- Speed: 35 knots (65 km/h; 40 mph)
- Range: 6,500 nmi (12,000 km; 7,500 mi) at 15 kn (28 km/h; 17 mph)
- Complement: 336
- Armament: 5 × single Mk 12 5 in (127 mm)/38 guns; 5 × twin 40 mm (1.6 in) Bofors AA guns; 7 × single 20 mm (0.8 in) Oerlikon AA guns; 2 × quintuple 21 in (533 mm) torpedo tubes; 6 × single depth charge throwers; 2 × depth charge racks

The third USS Murray (DD/DDE-576) was a Fletcher-class destroyer in the United States Navy during World War II. Murray was named for Capt. Alexander Murray and his grandson Rear Adm. Alexander Murray

Murray (DD-576) was laid down on 16 March 1942 by Consolidated Steel Corporation, Orange, Texas and launched on 16 August 1942, sponsored by Mrs. Frank T. Leighton. The ship was commissioned on 20 April 1943.

== Service history ==
=== World War II ===
After shakedown in the Caribbean, Murray served on escort duty in the Atlantic Ocean, then sailed to join Destroyer Squadron 25 at Pearl Harbor in September 1943. Sailing with a carrier task force, Murray took part in strikes on Wake Island 5–6 October, then voyaged to the South Pacific to support the landings on Bougainville 8–9 November, splashing three enemy aircraft. Two days later, while covering US 3rd Fleet aircraft carriers in a strike against Rabaul, Murray shot down two of a force of about 150 enemy aircraft attacking her formation.

Hewing to a demanding pace of operations, Murray was on antisubmarine patrol in the Gilbert Islands from 20 November to 8 December during the occupation of Tarawa and Abemama, then for the next month guarded shipping into the newly acquired islands. In January 1944 Murray performed outstandingly in fire support missions for the capture of Kwajalein, then screened transports carrying invasion forces to Eniwetok. Two months of escort duty in the western ocean routes followed, until she joined in the bombardment of Kavieng, New Ireland, 20 March.

Joining the 7th Fleet Murray took part in the assault on Aitape, New Guinea, 23 to 28 April, downing another enemy aircraft during an aerial torpedo attack. Rejoining the 6th Fleet in June, she screened amphibious craft during the assault on Saipan, then sailed to Guam for close-in fire support and transport screening duty 20 July to 26th. After patrol and escort duties for the consolidation of the Mariana Islands until late in August, Murray returned to the continuing operations around New Guinea. She bombarded Wewak 30 August to cover British minelaying operations, and in September covered the landings on Morotai. Returning to Hollandia, she prepared for the invasion of the Philippines, sortieing in escort of the transports for Leyte. On 20–21 October, she conducted shore bombardment, moving in as close as reefs would allow to fire over the landing force into enemy installations and at the same time aiding in repelling enemy air attacks.

Departing the Philippines immediately after the landings Murray overhauled at San Francisco, California, then in January 1945 escorted a battleship division to Pearl Harbor while en route to join Task Force 58. She screened the aircraft carriers and acted as picket during the first carrier raid on Tokyo 16 February and attacks on Iwo Jima and the Ryukyu Islands 26 February to 1 March, sinking a Japanese picket ship about 200 miles off the coast of Japan on 26 February. Murray next prepared for the Okinawa operation, during which she screened battleships from submarine attack during the initial preinvasion bombardment. Hit by a Japanese bomb 27 March, she retired to Pearl Harbor for repairs.

While returning to the forward areas by way of Eniwetok, Murray was ordered 2 July to locate, board, and search Japanese hospital ship Takasago Maru, bound for Wake Island and suspected of carrying arms or supplies, contraband for a hospital ship. She located the ship the next day, but search revealed nothing in violation of international law, so the hospital ship was allowed to proceed to Wake to embark sick and wounded Japanese.

Rejoining her force, now Task Force 38, Murray guarded the fast carriers in the raids against Honshū, Hokkaidō, and Kyūshū through the last 2 months of the war. In one of the most daring raids of the war, Murray and others of her squadron penetrated Suruga Bay, Honshū, 30 July to bombard the city of Shimizu, perhaps the deepest penetration of Japanese waters by any surface craft during the war.

=== After World War II ===
One of the initial occupation force, Murray became the first ship in empire waters to bring in a Japanese submarine when the enemy undersea fleet began to surrender. On 27 August, aircraft of TF 38, patrolling off Honshū, located a submarine flying the black flag designated as the surrender signal, and Murray was ordered to intercept and take the craft into Tokyo Bay for internment. Her boarding party received the swords of I-14's officers that same day, and the submarine was escorted to the mouth of Sagami Bay. Murray was present in Tokyo Bay for the formal Japanese surrender 2 September, then 3 days later sailed for the United States. Inactivated at Philadelphia Naval Shipyard, Murray decommissioned 27 March 1946, and went into reserve at Charleston, South Carolina.

=== Korean War years ===
In June 1951, Murray began conversion to an escort destroyer, for which she had been designated DDE-576 on 2 January 1951. She recommissioned at Charleston 16 October 1951.

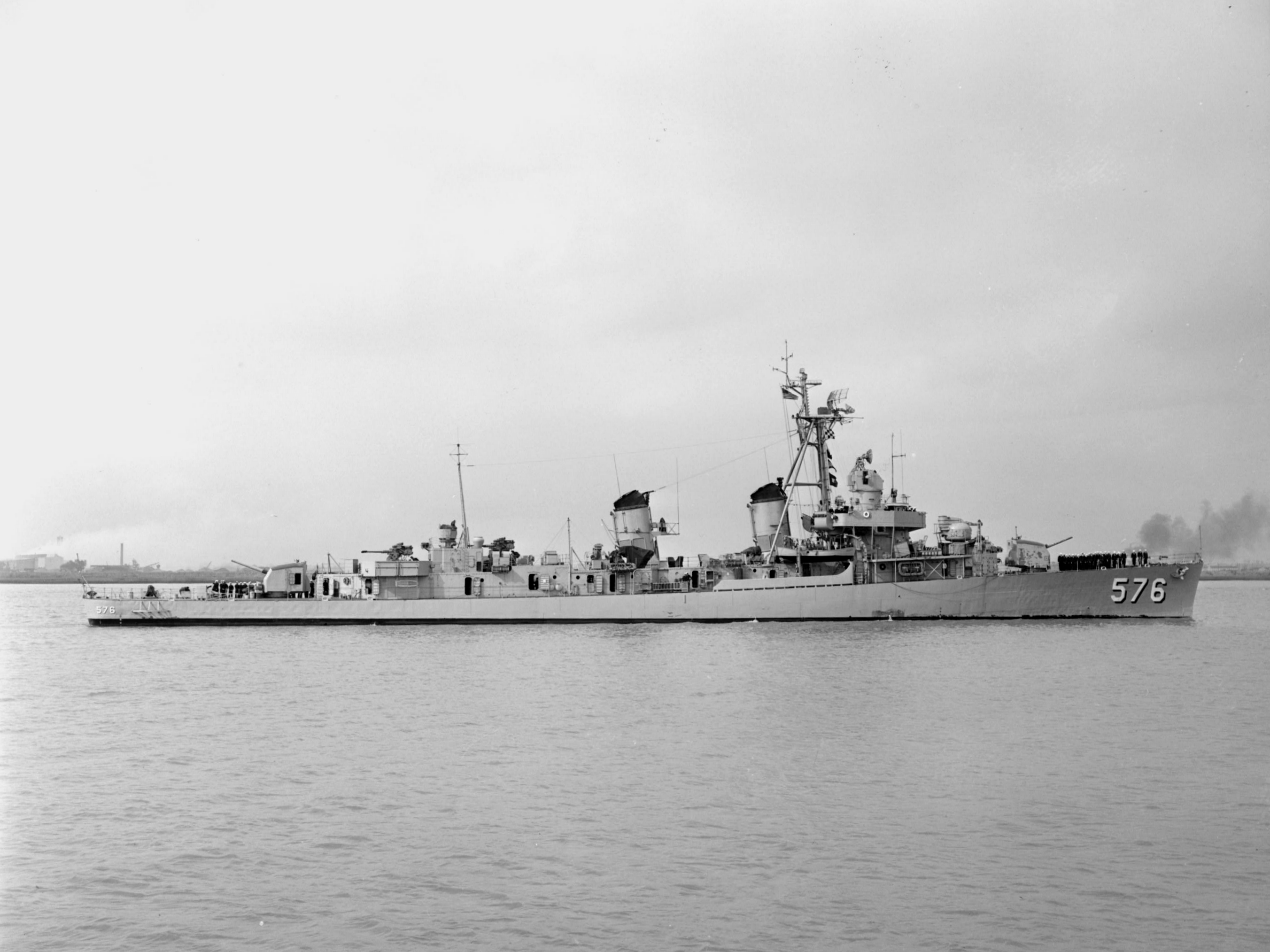
Murray underway after her recommissioning.

Early in 1952, Murray began East Coast and Caribbean training operations from her home port, Norfolk. She also served periodically as plane guard during carrier qualification of naval aviation cadets off Pensacola, Florida. In June 1953, she sailed for her first deployment to the Mediterranean, serving in the hunter killer force of the 6th Fleet. Her 1954 tour was marked by an extension to northern European ports. In 1956, Murray operated with Nautilus and participated in a NATO convoy escort exercise in European waters. During much of 1956 she underwent yard overhaul, then in 1957 sailed round Cape of Good Hope for patrol duty in the Persian Gulf, the usual access to which was blocked by the closing of the Suez Canal the previous autumn. With the canal free later in the spring, she joined the 6th Fleet in Mediterranean operations through August.

Between March 1958 and May 1961 Murray formed part of Task Group Alfa, an experimental development group working in antisubmarine warfare. The group usually operated off the Virginia Capes, but in the summers of 1959 and 1960 participated in the annual summer NROTC midshipmen training cruises, voyaging to Canadian ports and Bermuda.

=== 1960s ===
In late May 1961, Murray was one of the rescue ships stationed along the route of President John F. Kennedy's flight to Paris, then participated in that summer's midshipmen cruise. Redesignated DD-576 on 30 June 1962, Murray rejoined TG Alfa for its development operations, which were interrupted for participation in the Cuban Quarantine in October and November 1962 that forced Soviet missiles out of Cuba and averted grave international complications. At 1633 on 27 October 1962, the Murray Deck Log contains the following entry: "Sonar contact bearing 212 2,000 yards." The Murray sonar gang classified the contact as a possible submarine After several hours of "ping time" at 2050 hours the same date the Murray Deck Log contains the following additional entry: "Submarine surfaced bearing 080, 3,900 yards. 4 hours and 17 minutes after initial contact by this ship at LAT 27-36N, LONG 65-56.5W." Thus Murray was the first U.S. Navy destroyer to gain and hold contact with the first of three Soviet submarines forced to surface during the Cuban Missile Crisis. After training off New England early in 1963, Murray returned to Caribbean patrols then came north for the midshipmen cruise.

Murray sailed 29 November 1963 for her first 6th Fleet deployment in six years, visiting French, Spanish, and Italian ports before returning to Norfolk 23 May 1964. She cleared Norfolk again 8 September for NATO Arctic operations, crossing the Arctic Circle 21 September, and visiting Amsterdam before returning to Norfolk 23 October.

Decommissioned in May 1966 at Norfolk, Murray was struck from the Navy list 1 June 1966, and sold for scrapping to Boston Metals Co., Baltimore, Maryland, in 1966.

Murray received 11 battle stars for World War II service.
