= John Snyder (Pennsylvania politician) =

American politician (1793–1850)

John Snyder (January 29, 1793 – August 15, 1850) was a Democratic member of the U.S. House of Representatives from Pennsylvania.

John Snyder was born in Selinsgrove, Pennsylvania. He served in the War of 1812 as captain of Selinsgrove Rifle Volunteers of the Pennsylvania Militia. He was connected with the Snyder Spring Oil Company and paper mills.

Snyder was elected as a Democrat to the Twenty-seventh Congress. He was an unsuccessful candidate for reelection in 1842. He died in Selinsgrove in 1850. Interment in the New Lutheran Cemetery.

== Sources ==
- United States Congress. "John Snyder (id: S000667)". Biographical Directory of the United States Congress.

U.S. House of Representatives
Preceded by Robert Hanna Hammond	Member of the U.S. House of Representatives from Pennsylvania's 16th congressional district 1841–1843	Succeeded by James Black
