= USS Montezuma (1798) =

Warship of the United States Navy

History

United States
- Name: USS Montezuma
- Laid down: 1795
- Acquired: 26 June 1798
- Commissioned: August 1798
- Fate: Sold, 30 December 1799

General characteristics
- Tons burthen: 347 (bm)
- Draft: 16 ft (4.9 m)
- Propulsion: Sail
- Complement: 180 officers and enlisted
- Armament: 20 × 9-pounder guns

The first USS Montezuma was a merchant ship built in Virginia in 1795. The United States Navy acquired her during the Quasi-War with France and retained her name.

The Navy purchased Montezuma on 26 June 1798 from William Taylor at Baltimore, Maryland to be converted for military action against French naval vessels and privateers attacking American merchantmen during the Quasi-War. She officially entered service in August 1798, with Capt. Alexander Murray in command.

Departing Baltimore on 3 November, Montezuma sailed as flagship of a squadron consisting of brig Norfolk, cutter Eagle, and schooner Retaliation for the West Indies. The squadron was to cruise off Guadeloupe and Martinique to protect American merchantmen and search for French men-of-war. The ships encountered French vessels on 20 November and gave chase, capturing without a fight the brig Fair American, an American ship taken by French privateers only five days previously, but subsequently losing Retaliation to an attack by two French frigates. After a long chase the squadron was able to evade the French warships and then put into St. Thomas. Montezuma continued on her duty in the West Indies, convoying merchant ships to various Caribbean ports into 1799 and then on 7 March fell in with and captured French brig Les Amis, 16 guns, off Curaçao. Montezuma was ordered home in mid-March and arrived in Philadelphia on 12 May 1799 after convoying 57 merchant ships to various ports on the eastern seaboard.

Montezuma sailed on her second voyage to the West Indies on 28 May after Murray transferred his command to Lt. John Mullowny. This time she was bound for St. Kitts in the Leeward Islands, completing various escort duties before sailing to Jamaica to transport a large sum of prize money to Philadelphia, docking at Fort Mifflin on 31 July. Montezuma departed Fort Mifflin on 4 August for her third and final tour of duty with the Navy. She sailed to St. Kitts to pick up French prisoners for extradition to Baltimore. Arriving on 28 August, Montezuma's officers made a decision, based on the ship's cramped conditions, to take only 50 prisoners. Departing on 30 August to return to Baltimore, the ship arrived on 14 September. The crew, whose enlistment period was ending, was discharged from service and her officers placed on furlough.

A later inspection of Montezuma determined that the ship was too far along in deterioration to maintain her seakeeping ability as a warship; her guns and munitions were removed and the ship was laid up in port. In a letter dated 17 July, Secretary of the Navy Benjamin Stoddert stated that her gun deck was so low that in a good wind her guns were useless and she would be reduced to dependence on musketry if attacked. Following much deliberation, Montezuma was finally sold back to her original owner, William Taylor of Baltimore, on 30 December 1799. Re-equipped for merchant service, she sailed the Atlantic on the Baltimore-Liverpool trade route until disposed of some years before the beginning of the War of 1812.

== See also ==
- Moctezuma (ship)
