= John Darragh =

American politician

2nd Mayor of Pittsburgh
- In office July 31, 1817 – June 28, 1825
- Preceded by: Ebenezer Denny
- Succeeded by: John M. Snowden

Personal details
- Born: 1772 Ireland
- Died: May 14, 1828 (aged 55/56)
- Resting place: Allegheny Cemetery
- Spouse: Margaret "Peggy" Calhoun
- Children: Six (including Cornelius)

John Darragh (1772 – May 14, 1828) was a U.S. politician. He served as the Mayor of Pittsburgh from 1817 to 1825.

== Early life ==
Darragh was born in Ireland, the son of John Darragh and Margaret Oliver. In 1774, the Darragh family, including young John, his older brother Daniel, and at least one sister, emigrated to Nottingham Township, Pennsylvania, in the Pittsburgh area. Two more brothers, Neal and Archibald, would be born there.

Darragh began his career as a merchant on Fourth Avenue between Wood Street and Smithfield Street in the city. Darragh eventually parlayed his success as merchant into becoming the president of the Bank of Pittsburgh.

He married Margaret "Peggy" Calhoun and together they had six children, Their son Cornelius Darragh would become prominent in state politics and served as U.S. Representative for Pennsylvania's 21st congressional district from 1844 to 1847.

== Pittsburgh politics ==
Darragh served terms as Justice of the Peace and Burgess of the Borough.

John Darragh became mayor of Pittsburgh on January 14, 1817 on the sudden retirement of Ebenezer Denny because of health concerns. His tenure as mayor saw the construction of sidewalks and street drainage systems. The start of a citywide water system also took root during his service.

John Darragh also hosted world leaders for the first time in Pittsburgh's history. U.S. President James Monroe visited Pittsburgh on September 5, 1817; he toured military installations around the area, including the Allegheny Arsenal.

French statesmen and general Marquis de Lafayette also visited Pittsburgh with John Darragh as host on May 30, 1825.

== Later life ==
On Wednesday May 14, 1828, Darragh died after a long fight with consumption. Originally interred in the churchyard of Pittsburgh's First Presbyterian Church, his remains were reburied in 1861 at Allegheny Cemetery.

== Honors ==
Darragh Street near the University of Pittsburgh is named for John Darragh.

== See also ==
- List of mayors of Pittsburgh

Political offices
Preceded by Ebenezer Denny	Mayor of Pittsburgh; 1817–1825	Succeeded by John M. Snowden
