= Robert H. Hammond =

American politician

Member of the U.S. House of Representatives from Pennsylvania's 16th district
- In office March 4, 1837 – March 3, 1841
- Preceded by: Joseph Biles Anthony
- Succeeded by: John Snyder

Personal details
- Born: Robert Hanna Hammond; April 28, 1791 Milton, Pennsylvania, U.S.
- Died: June 2, 1847 (aged 56) At-sea
- Resting place: Milton Cemetery
- Party: Democratic

Robert Hanna Hammond (April 28, 1791 – June 2, 1847) was an American politician who served two terms as a Democratic member of the U.S. House of Representatives from Pennsylvania from 1837 to 1841.

== Biography ==
Robert Hanna Hammond was born in Milton, Pennsylvania. He was a member of the state militia, with the rank of brigadier general.

=== Military service ===
He enlisted in the United States Army as a lieutenant in 1817.

=== Public service ===
He resigned and returned to Milton to serve as register and recorder of Northumberland County, Pennsylvania. He served as postmaster of Milton from 1833 to 1837.

=== Congress ===
Hammond was elected as a Democrat to the twenty-fifth and twenty-sixth congresses.

=== Later career ===
He reentered the Army and was commissioned paymaster during the Mexican–American War. He was wounded and ordered home on sick leave.

=== Death and burial ===
He died at sea before reaching port in 1847. Interment in Milton Cemetery in Milton, Pennsylvania.

== Sources ==
- United States Congress. "Robert H. Hammond (id: H000132)". Biographical Directory of the United States Congress.

U.S. House of Representatives
Preceded by Joseph Biles Anthony	Member of the U.S. House of Representatives from Pennsylvania's 16th congressional district 1837–1841	Succeeded by John Snyder
