= Jonathan Hoge Walker =

American judge

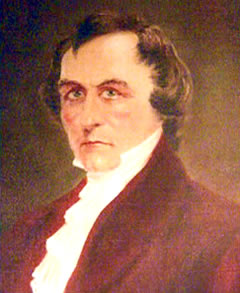

Judge of the United States District Court for the Western District of Pennsylvania
- In office April 20, 1818 – March 23, 1824
- Appointed by: James Monroe
- Preceded by: Seat established by 3 Stat. 462
- Succeeded by: William Wilkins

Personal details
- Born: Jonathan Hoge Walker; July 20, 1754 Hogestown, Province of Pennsylvania, British America
- Died: March 24, 1824 (aged 69) Natchez, Mississippi
- Education: Dickinson College read law

Jonathan Hoge Walker (July 20, 1754 – March 23, 1824) was a United States district judge of the United States District Court for the Western District of Pennsylvania.

== Education and career ==
Born on July 20, 1754, near Hogestown, Silver Spring Township, Cumberland County, Province of Pennsylvania, British America, Walker graduated from Dickinson College in 1787 and read law in 1790. He was elected as a member to the American Philosophical Society in 1786. He served as a soldier in the Continental Army during the American Revolutionary War. He entered private practice in Northumberland, Pennsylvania from 1790 to 1806. He was President Judge of the Pennsylvania Court of Common Pleas for the Fourth Judicial District from 1806 to 1818.

Among his children was Robert J. Walker (1801−1869), who served as a U.S. senator from Mississippi and Secretary of the Treasury under President James K. Polk.

== Federal judicial service ==
Walker was nominated by President James Monroe on April 20, 1818, to the United States District Court for the Western District of Pennsylvania, to a new seat authorized by 3 Stat. 462. He was confirmed by the United States Senate on April 20, 1818, and received his commission the same day. His service terminated on March 23, 1824, due to his death in Natchez, Mississippi.

== Sources ==
Legal offices
Preceded by Seat established by 3 Stat. 462	Judge of the United States District Court for the Western District of Pennsylvania; 1818–1824	Succeeded by William Wilkins
