= Wilkins Tannehill =

American politician

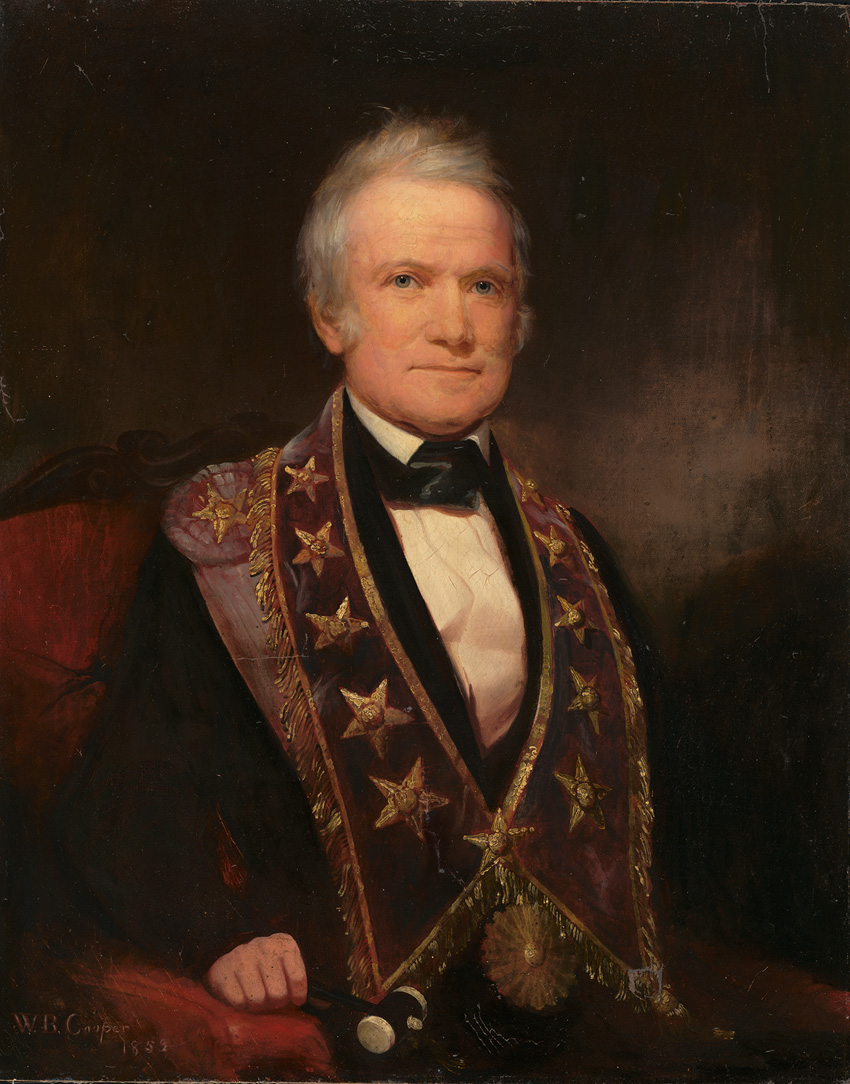
- Tannehill in Masonic regalia, c. 1859
- Born: March 2, 1787; Pittsburgh, Pennsylvania, U.S.
- Died: June 2, 1858 (aged 71)
- Resting place: Nashville City Cemetery
- Education: Pittsburgh Academy
- Political party: Whig Party
- Spouse: Eliza Dewees
- Children: 7
- Relatives: John Wilkins, Jr. (maternal uncle); William Wilkins (maternal uncle); Samuel Van Dyke Stout (brother-in-law); Samuel Hollingsworth Stout (nephew)

Wilkins Tannehill (1787–1858) was an American Whig politician and author. He served as the Mayor of Nashville, Tennessee from 1825 to 1827.

== Early life ==
Wilkins Tannehill was born on March 2, 1787, in Pittsburgh, Pennsylvania. He was a student at the Pittsburgh Academy, forerunner to the University of Pittsburgh. He had three sisters, Catherine, Rachel, and Nancy. He was the son of Josiah Tannehill (1752-1811), who had fought in the American Revolutionary War of 1775–1783 and Margaret Wilkins (1767-1811). His maternal grandfather John Wilkins, Sr. (1733-1810). His uncles were John Wilkins, Jr. (1761–1816), Quartermaster General of the United States Army from 1796 to 1802, and William Wilkins (1779–1865), who served as United States Senator from Pennsylvania from 1831 to 1834, United States Ambassador to Russia from 1835 to 1835, United States Representative for Pennsylvania's 21st congressional district from 1843 to 1844, and 19th United States Secretary of War from 1844 to 1845.

== Career ==
Tannehill moved to Nashville in 1808, where he managed a warehouse owned by his uncle. During the War of 1812, they sold saltpeter critical for the war efforts. Later, he opened a grocery store in Nashville and Pulaski, Tennessee.

Tannehill served as alderman of Nashville in 1813 and Director of the Nashville Bank in 1814. He served on the Board of Trustees of Cumberland College, later known as the University of Nashville, from 1814 to 1821 and from 1825 to 1832. He served as Mayor of Nashville from 1825 to 1827. He founded two newspaper, The Daily Orthopolitan in 1845, and Tannehill's Port Folio, a monthly journal of freemasonry and general literature, in 1847.

In 1849, Tannehill founded the Merchants Library and Reading Room, a subscription library in downtown Nashville. Hugh Henry Brackenridge called him "one of the most finished scholars of the West."

== Freemasonry ==
Tannehill was a freemason and the first initiate of Cumberland Lodge 8 on April 24, 1813. He became a Knight Templar in 1813. In 1817, he was elected to his first term as grand master of the Grand Lodge of Tennessee. Tannehill was elected seven times to the office of grand master and was the longest-serving grand master in the history of the Grand Lodge of Tennessee, holding the office in 1817, 1818, 1820, 1821, 1824, 1841, and 1842. He also served as Grand High Priest of Royal Arch Masonry in Tennessee in 1829. In the 1840s and 1850s, he helped raise money from other lodges for the Masonic College (now known as Rhodes College) in Clarksville, Tennessee, Jackson College in Columbia, Tennessee, and small colleges in Huntingdon, Tennessee, Macon, Tennessee and Bradley County, Tennessee. Tannehill published his Masonic Manual in 1824 and a revised version in 1845. This work contained the ritual for the degrees, other ceremonies, historical sketches, and the Ancient Landmarks. In addition to adoption by the Grand Lodge of Tennessee, other states also adopted the Tannehill's Masonic Manual. From 1847 to 1850, he published Tannehill's Port Folio, a monthly Masonic journal. On reporting his death, The Freemason's Monthly Magazine of Boston, Massachusetts wrote: "Wise in counsel, prudent in action, he was regarded as peculiarly fitted, by his habits of life and high moral standing, to conduct the affairs of the Grand Lodge of Tennessee as its honored grand master. ... Brother Tannehill was hailed as the Genius of Masonry, and all bore willing testimony to his worth as a Man and a Mason."

== Personal life and death ==
Tannehill married Eliza Dewees in 1810. His brother-in-law was William Tyler Berry, who founded Berry Hill, Tennessee. With Eliza, he had a son, Wilkins Farmer Tannehill, who moved to Memphis, Tennessee, and six daughters: Eliza Jane Tannehill, Mary Tannehill, Anne Tannehill, Samuella Dewees Tannehill, Louise Elizabeth Tannehill and Helen Tannehill. He turned blind by the end of his life. He died on June 2, 1858, and he is buried in the Nashville City Cemetery. In 1918, due to the increased industrial areas around the cemetery, the Grand Lodge of Tennessee appropriated funds to move Tannehill's remains and his Masonic monument to Mt. Olivet Cemetery, but his family declined.

== Bibliography ==
- Freemason's Manual (1824)
- Sketches of the History of Literature from the Earliest Period to the Revival of Letters in the Fifteenth Century (1827).
- Sketches of the History of Roman Literature

Masonic offices
Preceded by Robert Searcy	Grand Master of the Grand Lodge of Tennessee; 1817–1818	Succeeded by Oliver B. Hayes
Preceded by Oliver B. Hayes	Grand Master of the Grand Lodge of Tennessee; 1820–1821	Succeeded by Andrew Jackson
Preceded by Andrew Jackson	Grand Master of the Grand Lodge of Tennessee; 1824	Succeeded by Mathew D. Cooper
Preceded by George A. Wilson	Grand Master of the Grand Lodge of Tennessee; 1841–1842	Succeeded by Joseph Norvell
Political offices
Preceded by Randal McGavock	Mayor of Nashville, Tennessee; 1825–1827	Succeeded by Felix Robertson
