= Walter H. Lowrie =

American judge

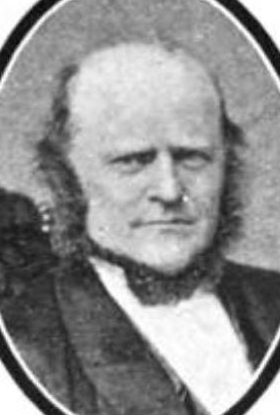

Walter Hoge Lowrie (March 31, 1807 – November 14, 1876) was a Pennsylvania jurist.

He was born in Armstrong County, Pennsylvania, son of Matthew B. Lowrie, and nephew of Senator Walter Lowrie. After serving in the Pittsburgh Bureau of Fire until 1842, he became a lawyer, serving as a district judge in Pennsylvania from 1846 to 1851. An 1826 graduate of the Western University of Pennsylvania, now known as the University of Pittsburgh, he was also served as the first professor of law at the university from 1843 to 1851. He was elected justice of the Pennsylvania Supreme Court, serving from 1851 to 1857, and promoted to chief justice of the court, serving from 1857 to 1863. His bid for reelection in 1863 was unsuccessful; he lost his seat to Daniel Agnew by over 12,000 votes.

He died of heart disease in Meadville, Pennsylvania, on November 14, 1876. He is interred in Allegheny Cemetery, Pittsburgh.

Legal offices
Preceded by Ellis Lewis	Chief Justice of the Pennsylvania Supreme Court; 1857–1863	Succeeded by George W. Woodward
