= Samuel Van Dyke Stout =

American politician

- Born: April 18, 1786; Redstone Fort, Fayette County, Pennsylvania, U.S.
- Died: August 8, 1850 (aged 64); Nashville, Tennessee, U.S.
- Resting place: Nashville City Cemetery
- Occupations: Silverplater, coach factory owner, politician
- Political party: Whig Party
- Spouse: Catherine Tannehill
- Children: 3 sons (including Samuel Hollingsworth Stout), 3 daughters
- Relatives: Wilkins F. Tannehill (brother-in-law)

Samuel Van Dyke Stout (1786–1850) was an American Whig politician. He served as the Mayor of Nashville, Tennessee from 1841 to 1842.

== Early life ==
Samuel Van Dyke Stout was born on April 18, 1786, in Redstone Fort, Fayette County, Pennsylvania. His father, Abraham Stout, was silver plater. His mother, Jane Pettit. He grew up in Kentucky and moved to Nashville in 1811.

== Career ==
Stout settled in Nashville, Tennessee in 1811. He first worked for his father's silver plating business. He subsequently opened a carriage factory on Clark Street. His business became successful, and he is credited with making the carriage that President Andrew Jackson rode on his journey from Nashville to Washington, D.C. for his inauguration on March 4, 1829.

Stout served on the Nashville Board of Aldermen from 1824 to 1825, 1830 to 1832, 1835 to 1837, 1838 to 1839, in 1844, and from 1846 to 1850. He served as Mayor of Nashville from 1841 to 1842. He was a freemason.

== Personal life and death ==
Stout married Catherine Tannehill in Nashville on October 12, 1813, at the home of Catherine's brother, Wilkins F. Tannehill, who would later himself serve as the city mayor. They had three sons, Josiah W., Charles C., Samuel H., and three daughters, Margaret Jane, Ira Abraham, and Catherine. They resided on First Avenue in Nashville, Tennessee. He attended the First Presbyterian Church.

Stout died of apoplexy on August 8, 1850. He was buried in the Nashville City Cemetery.

Political offices
Preceded by Charles Clay Trabue	Mayor of Nashville, Tennessee; 1841-1842	Succeeded by Thomas B. Coleman
