= Ebenezer Denny =

American soldier and politician (1761-1822)

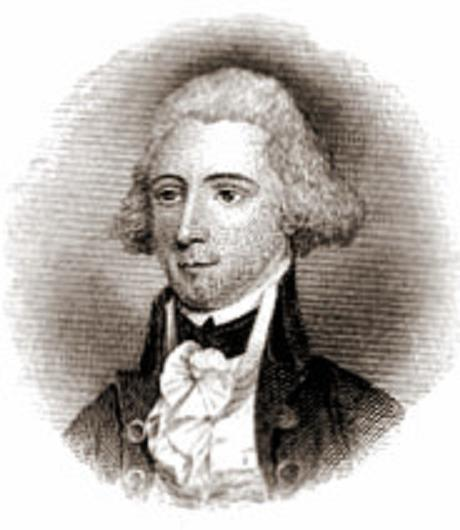
- Ebenezer Denny

1st mayor of Pittsburgh
- In office 1816–1817
- Preceded by: William Steele, as Chief Burgess of Pittsburgh Borough
- Succeeded by: John Darragh

Personal details
- Born: March 11, 1761 Carlisle, Pennsylvania
- Died: July 21, 1822 (aged 61)

Military service
- Allegiance: United States
- Branch/service: Continental Army; US Army
- Years of service: 1778–1783, 1784–1792, 1794
- Rank: Captain (US Army), Major (Militia)
- Battles/wars: American Revolutionary War; Northwest Indian War

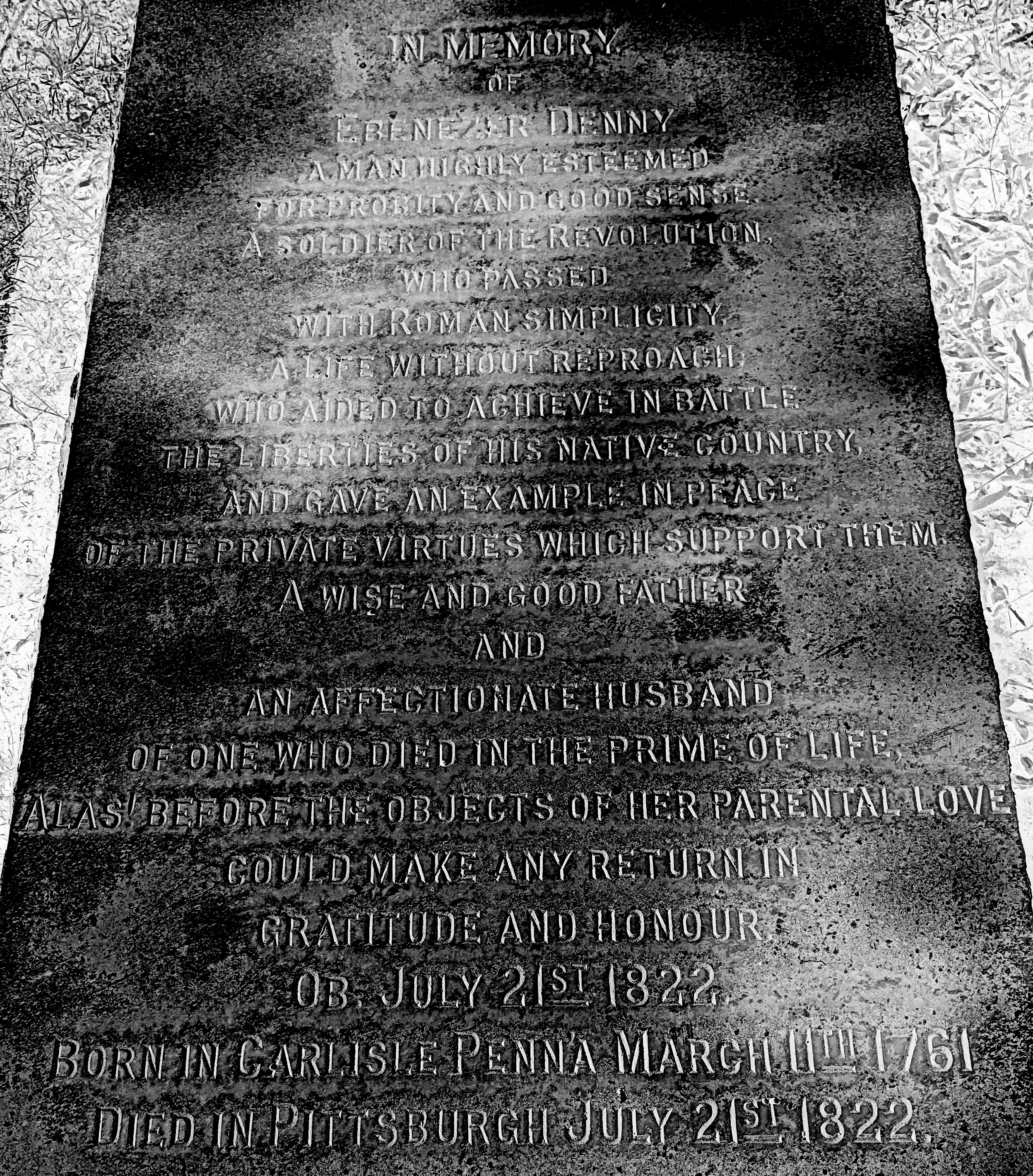

Ebenezer Denny (March 11, 1761 – July 21, 1822) was an American soldier and politician. Having fought in the American Revolutionary War, his journal is one of the most frequently quoted accounts of the surrender of the British at the siege of Yorktown. Denny later served as the first mayor of Pittsburgh, from 1816 to 1817.

== Early life ==
Denny was born in Carlisle, Pennsylvania, on March 11, 1761, the eldest son of William and Agnes Parker Denny. At the age of 13 he was entrusted to carry dispatches across the Allegheny Mountains by the commandant at Fort Pitt. He crossed alone often; to conceal his presence he hid in the woods at night. At one point he was chased by Indians, finding shelter at Fort Loudon. He then entered into employment for his father's shop in Carlisle. Upon learning that a privateer ship was to sail, with a letter of marque, from Philadelphia for the West Indies, he joined the crew as a volunteer. For his gallantry in numerous sea fights, he was promoted to command the quarterdeck.

== Revolutionary War ==
As he was readying to sail on his second voyage he received a commission as ensign in the 1st Pennsylvania Regiment of the Continental Army in 1778. On August 4, 1780, he was transferred to the 7th Pennsylvania Regiment, and on May 23, 1781, he was promoted to lieutenant in the 4th Pennsylvania Regiment. He served under lieutenant colonel Richard Butler, and General Anthony Wayne.

This transpired during 1781 as the Continental Army marched south to face Cornwallis at Yorktown, Virginia, as War for Independence drew to a close. Near Williamsburg, Virginia, the regiment had a successful encounter against British forces, the partisan Simcoe. Denny in his military journal states, "Here for the first time saw wounded men; the sight sickened me."

At the 1781 Battle of Green Spring, Denny was the only officer who was not wounded, and was responsible for his company's retreat. Denny credited the orderly retreat to "the veteran first sergeant, the most important officer."

As the Continental Army closed around the British stronghold at Yorktown, Lt. Denny described the scene, "Army encamped on the banks of the James River; part of the French fleet in full view."

His journal entry dated September 14, 1781, continues into further detail of the encampment:

General Washington Arrived; our brigade was paraded to receive him. Officers all pay their respects. He stands in the door, takes every man by the hand; the offices all pass in, receiving his salute, and shake hands. This is the first time I have seen the General.

October 15, 1781, the siege at Yorktown begins:

Siege operations were at once commenced; the fighting became very warm on all sides, and the siege works were pushed with great vigor. Easy digging. light, sandy soil. A shell from one of French mortars set fire to a British frigate; she burned to the water's edge and then blew up; made the earth shake.

October 17, 1781, the surrender of Cornwallis:

Had the pleasure of seeing a drummer mount the enemy's parapet and beat a parley and immediately an officer, holding up a white handkerchief, made his appearance. An officer from our line ran and met him and tied the handkerchief over his eyes, and thus was the great event of the surrender of Cornwallis accomplished.

Denny remained in the Continental Army until it was disbanded on November 3, 1783. Earlier that year, he became an Original Member of the Pennsylvania Society of the Cincinnati.

== Northwest Indian War ==
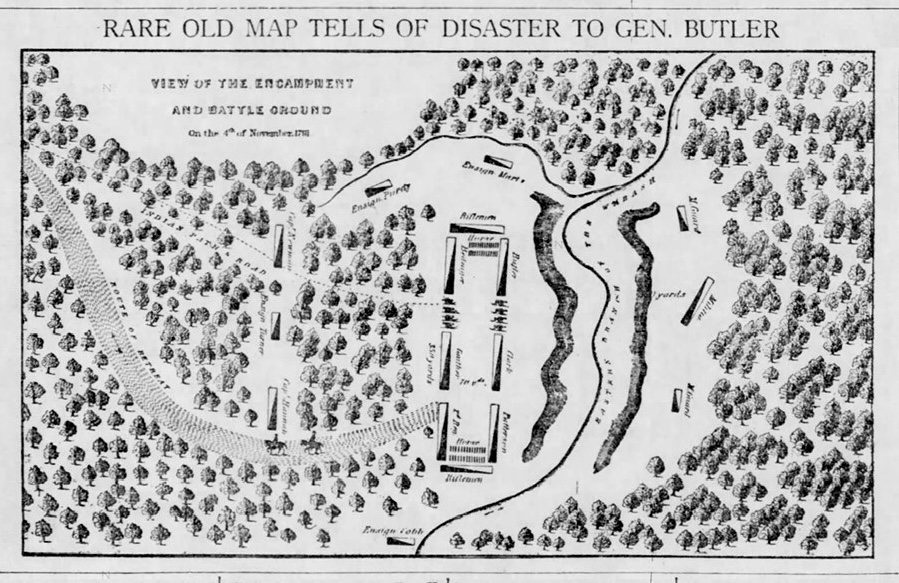
1791 St. Clair's defeat: "Rare old map tells of disaster to Gen. Butler" (Mapped by Ebenezer Denny of Pittsburg)

Denny rejoined the army as a lieutenant in the First American Regiment in August 1784, and was active in the Northwest Indian War. He participated in the 1790 Harmar Campaign and served as aide-de-camp to Major-General Arthur St. Clair at St. Clair's Defeat. Denny kept a journal, which is considered an important primary document of the two campaigns. Following the battle, Lt. Denny wrote that the native nations were "an enemy brought up from infancy to war, and perhaps superior to an equal number of the best men that could be taken against them." He travelled to Philadelphia to deliver the official report of the loss to Secretary of War Henry Knox and President George Washington.

While in Philadelphia, Denny described encountering friends who "view me as escaped from the dead— astonishment takes place of pleasure; and having in some degree got over those feelings myself, am considered as little better than one of the savages." He also met General Harmar while there, and received a commission as a captain. He resigned his commission on 1 May 1792.

In March 1794, Denny was again appointed as captain, this time of the Allegheny County militia.

Denny also compiled a dictionary of Delaware and Shawnee words. He was promoted to captain on December 29, 1789 and resigned from the U.S. Army in May 1792. Later, Denny was commissioned a major in the Pennsylvania Militia. In June 1794, he was sent with Andrew Ellicott to refurbish Fort Franklin in Venango County, Pennsylvania. He was then in command of a small detachment assigned to protect construction workers who were laying out a town near the site of Fort Presque Isle. In 1794, Major Denny resigned his commission and settled near Pittsburgh.

== Pittsburgh ==
Unlike in other states, communities in the Commonwealth of Pennsylvania could not attain city status until after spending a number of years as a borough with a government run by burgesses, a form of city council. Partly because of this, Denny instead started his political career in county government serving Pittsburgh.

In 1797, Denny was elected Allegheny County Commissioner. He eventually sought even higher office and ran successfully as Treasurer for the entire county in 1803 and 1808.

Being a Revolutionary War hero, and major patriot force for the frontier front of the War of 1812, Denny ran successfully to become the first mayor of the city of Pittsburgh on 19 July 1816.

His term in office saw much progress in the infrastructure of the young city, improving roads and wharves. Citing failing health he retired from public life and the mayor's office on January 14, 1817. He died 21 July 1822, and is interred at Allegheny Cemetery in the Lawrenceville neighborhood of Pittsburgh.

== Family ==
Ebenezer Denny married Nancy Wilkins and had four children. His eldest, son Harmar Denny, went on to establish a political career of his own: a member of the Pennsylvania State House of Representatives from 1824 to 1829, as well as being elected to the Twenty-first Congress through the Twenty-fourth Congress serving from 15 December 1829, to 3 March 1837.

His second great-grandson, Harmar D. Denny Jr., served in the 82nd Congress in the U.S. House of Representatives from Pennsylvania's 29th congressional district.

== Honors ==
One of the first resolutions of the Pittsburgh City Council was that of honoring the patriotic and public service of Ebenezer Denny on learning of his early retirement due to health concerns in 1817. Denny Street, in the city's Lawrenceville neighborhood, was named in his honor.

Preceded by Office established	Mayor of Pittsburgh; 1816–1817	Succeeded by John Darragh
Military offices
Preceded by William North	Adjutant General of the U. S. Army; October 28, 1787 – November 7, 1790 (acting)	Succeeded by John Pratt (acting)
Preceded by Winthrop Sargent (acting)	Adjutant General of the U. S. Army; November 4, 1791 – March 10, 1792 (acting)	Succeeded by Henry De Butts (acting)
