= USS Murray (DD-97) =

Wickes-class destroyer

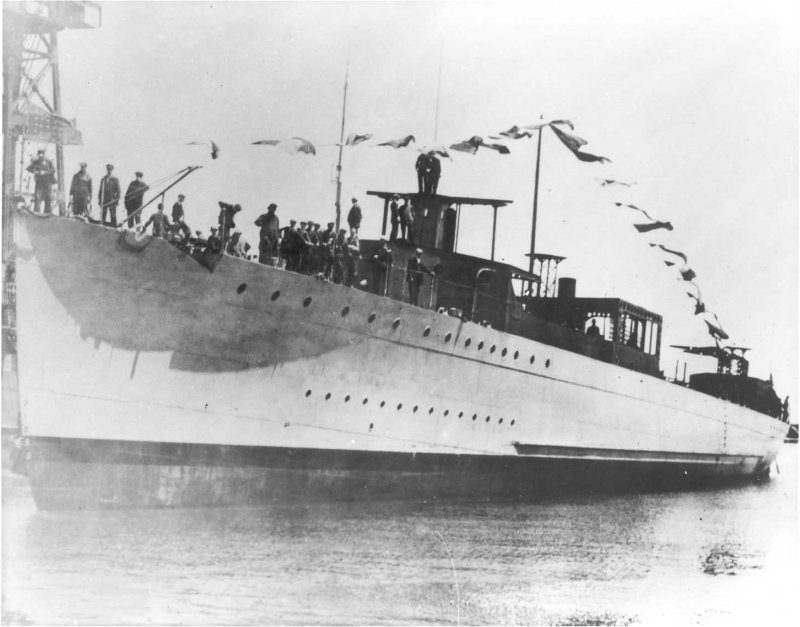
- USS Murray (DD-97)

History

United States
- Name: USS Murray
- Namesake: Alexander Murray
- Builder: Fore River Shipyard, Quincy, Massachusetts
- Laid down: 22 December 1917
- Launched: 8 June 1918
- Commissioned: 21 August 1918
- Decommissioned: 1 July 1922
- Reclassified: 17 July 1920
- Stricken: 7 January 1936
- Fate: Sold for scrap, 29 September 1936

General characteristics
- Class & type: Wickes-class destroyer
- Displacement: 1,202–1,208 long tons (1,221–1,227 t) (standard); 1,295–1,322 long tons (1,316–1,343 t) (deep load)
- Length: 314 ft 4 in (95.8 m)
- Beam: 30 ft 11 in (9.42 m)
- Draught: 9 ft 10 in (3.0 m)
- Installed power: 27,000 shp (20,000 kW); 4 water-tube boilers
- Propulsion: 2 shafts, 2 steam turbines
- Speed: 35 knots (65 km/h; 40 mph) (design)
- Range: 2,500 nautical miles (4,600 km; 2,900 mi) at 20 knots (37 km/h; 23 mph) (design)
- Complement: 6 officers, 108 enlisted men
- Armament: 4 × single 4-inch (102 mm) guns; 2 × single 1-pounder AA guns; 4 × triple 21 inch (533 mm) torpedo tubes; 2 × depth charge rails

USS Murray (DD-97) was a Wickes-class destroyer built for the United States Navy during World War I.

== Description ==
The Wickes class was an improved and faster version of the preceding Caldwell-class. Two different designs were prepared to the same specification that mainly differed in the turbines and boilers used. The ships built to the Bethlehem Steel design, built in the Fore River and Union Iron Works shipyards, mostly used Yarrow boilers that deteriorated badly during service and were mostly scrapped during the 1930s. The ships displaced 1,202–1,208 long tons (1,221–1,227 t) at standard load and 1,295–1,322 long tons (1,316–1,343 t) at deep load. They had an overall length of 314 feet 4 inches (95.8 m), a beam of 30 feet 11 inches (9.4 m) and a draught of 9 feet 10 inches (3.0 m). They had a crew of 6 officers and 108 enlisted men.

Performance differed radically between the ships of the class, often due to poor workmanship. The Wickes class was powered by two steam turbines, each driving one propeller shaft, using steam provided by four water-tube boilers. The turbines were designed to produce a total of 27,000 shaft horsepower (20,000 kW) intended to reach a speed of 35 knots (65 km/h; 40 mph). The ships carried 225 long tons (229 t) of fuel oil which was intended gave them a range of 2,500 nautical miles (4,600 km; 2,900 mi) at 20 knots (37 km/h; 23 mph).

The ships were armed with four 4-inch (102 mm) guns in single mounts and were fitted with two 1-pounder guns for anti-aircraft defense. Their primary weapon, though, was their torpedo battery of a dozen 21 inch (533 mm) torpedo tubes in four triple mounts. In many ships a shortage of 1-pounders caused them to be replaced by 3-inch (76 mm) anti-aircraft (AA) guns. They also carried a pair of depth charge rails. A "Y-gun" depth charge thrower was added to many ships.

== Construction and career ==
Murray, named for Commodore Alexander Murray and Commodore Murray's grandson, Alexander Murray,, was laid down 22 December 1917 by Fore River Shipbuilding Corporation, Quincy, Massachusetts; launched 8 June 1918; sponsored by Miss Alice S. Guthrie; and commissioned at Boston 21 August 1918.

During her four years of operations along the East Coast and in the Caribbean with the Atlantic Fleet, Murray aided in postwar development of antisubmarine and mine warfare techniques. She was reclassified to a light minelayer (DM-2) 17 July 1920, and received alterations necessary to her new role. She decommissioned at Philadelphia 1 July 1922, and lay there in reserve until stricken from the Navy list on 7 January 1936. She was sold for scrapping 29 September 1936 to Schiavone-Bonomo Corporation, New York City.
