= William Marks (politician) =

American politician (1778–1858)

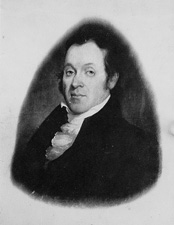

United States Senator from Pennsylvania
- In office March 4, 1825 – March 4, 1831
- Preceded by: Walter Lowrie
- Succeeded by: William Wilkins

Member of the Pennsylvania Senate
- In office 1820-1825

Member of the Pennsylvania House of Representatives
- In office 1810-1819

Personal details
- Born: October 13, 1778 Chester County, Pennsylvania
- Died: April 10, 1858 (aged 79) Beaver, Pennsylvania
- Party: National Republican

William Marks (October 13, 1778 – April 10, 1858) was an American lawyer and politician from Beaver, Pennsylvania. He served in both houses in the state legislature and was the Speaker for the House from 1813 to 1819. He later represented Pennsylvania in the United States Senate.

== Life and career ==
He was born on October 13, 1778, in Chester County, Pennsylvania and moved with his father to Allegheny County, Pennsylvania in his early childhood. He received little formal schooling and trained in the trade of leather tanning. Marks subsequently studied law and was admitted to the bar. He practiced law in Pittsburgh and held several local offices, including coroner of Allegheny County, and was elected to the Pennsylvania House of Representatives, where he served from 1810 to 1819. He served as speaker beginning in 1813. In 1814, Marks served as commander of the Pennsylvania Militia. He was subsequently elected to the Pennsylvania Senate in 1820, serving until 1825.

Marks was elected to the United States Senate as a National Republican in 1824 and assumed office in March 1825. After unsuccessfully seeking reelection, his term expired in March 1831. He served as chairman of the Committee on Engrossed Bills and Committee on Agriculture during his tenure as U.S. Senator.

After his term in the U.S. Senate, Marks resumed practicing law in Pittsburgh, after which he moved to Beaver, Pennsylvania and retired to private life in 1850. He died in Beaver on April 10, 1858, and was interred in the old Buffalo Street cemetery in the McCreery lot.

U.S. Senate
Preceded by Walter Lowrie	U.S. senator (Class 3) from Pennsylvania; 1825–1831; Served alongside: William Findlay, Isaac D. Barnard	Succeeded by William Wilkins
