= Alexander Murray (1755–1821) =

US naval officer (1755–1821)

Commodore Alexander Murray
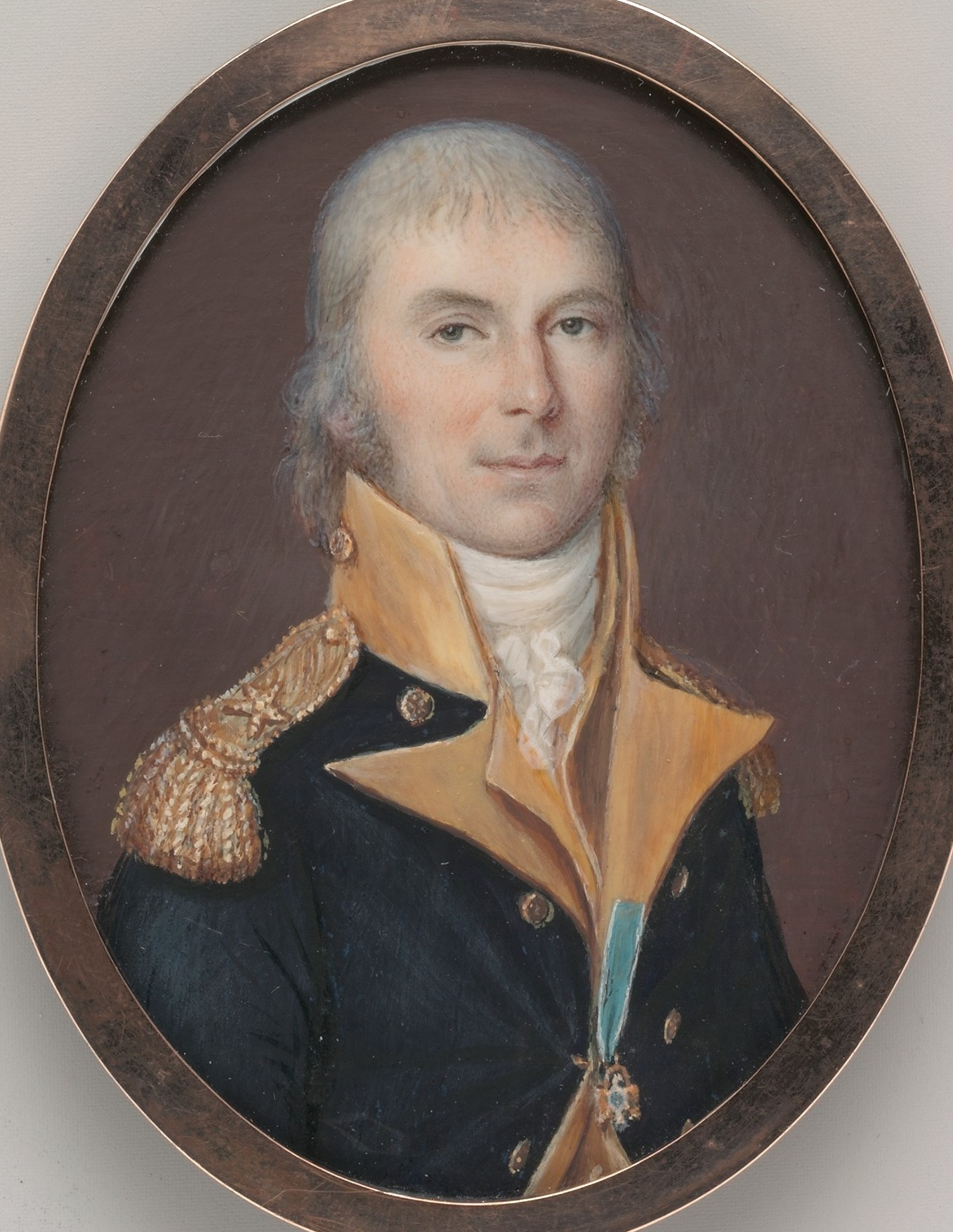
- Portrait of Murray, 1798
- Born: July 12, 1755; Chestertown, Maryland, U.S.
- Died: October 6, 1821 (aged 66); Philadelphia, Pennsylvania, U.S.
- Burial place: Laurel Hill Cemetery, Philadelphia, Pennsylvania, U.S.
- Relatives: Magnus Miller Murray (son); Alexander Murray (grandson)
- Military career
- Allegiance: United States of America
- Branch: Continental Navy; Continental Army; United States Navy
- Service years: 1776–1783; 1794–1821
- Rank: Captain (Army); Commodore (Navy)
- Units: 1st Maryland Regiment
- Commands: USS Montezuma; USS Insurgent; USS Constellation; USS Adams; Philadelphia Navy Yard
- Conflicts: American Revolutionary War; Quasi-War; First Barbary War

Commodore (Note: The rank of "Commodore" did not officially exist in the U.S. Navy before 1862. Nevertheless, the term was applied to, or adopted by, numerous senior captains who commanded a squadron at sea.) Alexander Murray (July 12, 1755 – October 6, 1821) was an officer who served in the Continental Navy, the Continental Army, and later the United States Navy, during the American Revolutionary War, the Quasi-War with France and the First Barbary War in North Africa.

== Biography ==
=== Family background ===
Murray's grandfather had been exiled to Barbados from his home in Elginshire, Scotland, following the Jacobite Rising of 1715, and his father Dr William Murray may have been born there before moving to Chestertown, Maryland, to practice as a physician, marry, and have several children with wife Ann Smith, of whom Alexander was the youngest.

=== DNA Evidence ===
Current advanced Y-DNA NGS testing of descendants of Alexander Murray through the Murray Clan DNA Research Project at Family Tree DNA has proven that he was a descended from a branch of the Murray of Tullibardine / Culbin line from whom the current Clan Chief of Clan Murray also descends.

=== Early career ===
As a young man Alexander Murray went to sea, and such was his skill that by the age of 18 he was the master of a merchant ship plying its trade between America and Europe.

=== American Revolution ===
Soon after the outbreak of the Revolutionary War, in 1776 the 21-year-old Murray was appointed a lieutenant in the Continental Navy. There being no posts available, Murray declined the offer of a letter of marque, and instead gained a commission as a lieutenant in the 1st Maryland Regiment under the command of Colonel William Smallwood.

Murray found himself in the thick of the New York and New Jersey campaign. He saw action at the Battle of White Plains in October 1776, after which he was promoted to captain, as was his friend, and fellow lieutenant of the Maryland Line, James Monroe. While serving at New York he suffered severe hearing loss from a bursting cannon while firing at a British fleet making its way up the North River (the lower Hudson along the west side of Manhattan). Murray served in the Army until the end of 1777, when he returned home on sick leave.

Murray applied to the Marine Committee for sea-service and was again offered the command of a privateer, which this time he accepted. Murray operated in the Atlantic Ocean with some success. Eventually, while commanding the Revenge, he captured a British ship near Newfoundland, but over-burdened with prisoners bore away for a port in France. Unfortunately, his ship and prize were captured by a British fleet, and were returned to New York City, then in possession of Sir William Howe's army.

Murray gave his parole, and was soon exchanged. He was then appointed to the frigate Trumbull. The ship set sail in August 1781, but after surviving a violent storm with some damage to her spars and rigging, on August 28 she found herself confronted by the British frigate Iris and sloop of war HMS General Monk. After a fierce action in heavy seas with Iris, the Trumbull was repeatedly raked by Monk. Now unmanageable, and more than a third of the crew wounded or dead, the Trumbull surrendered. Trumbull was towed into New York, where Murray recovered from his wounds and was once more exchanged.

Murray commanded a letter-of-marque on a successful voyage to St. Thomas with a cargo of tobacco, fighting off a British privateer, and capturing another, before taking part in an expedition against the Bahamas, and capturing New Providence.

He was then appointed First Lieutenant of the frigate Alliance under the command of John Barry, sailing on her final cruise across the Atlantic, to France, and then to the West Indies, before the war's end in early 1783. The Continental Navy was disbanded at the end of the war and Murray returned to private life.

Murray was one of the few naval officers to be an original member of the Society of the Cincinnati.

=== Quasi-War with France ===
In 1794 the government, in response to attacks on American merchant shipping, passed the Naval Act, which authorised the building of six new frigates, and established the United States Navy.

Murray received a commission as one of the first thirteen post-captains in the new Navy, and in August 1798 was assigned to command the corvette Montezuma, with orders to protect American shipping in the Caribbean from French privateers. Such was his success that he was voted the Thanks of Congress, and was given command of the frigate Insurgent, formerly a French ship which had been captured by Thomas Truxtun. Insurgent sailed from Hampton Roads on 14 August 1799, and cruised in European waters during the winter of 1799–1800. She captured the French ship Vendemaire, and recaptured the American ships Margaret, Angora, Commerce, and William and Mary. Insurgent returned to the United States in March 1800 via the West Indies. Murray was then appointed to the command of the frigate USS Constellation by 3 May 1800, and patrolled in the West Indies until early 1802,

=== First Barbary War ===
In early 1802 he was appointed the commodore of a small squadron sent to blockade Tripoli. In Constellation, he relieved Commodore Richard Dale (with whom he had served aboard the Trumbull). Murray distributed his small force, so as not to allow a single Tripolitan ship to escape to prey upon American merchantmen. At one time he was entirely alone and becalmed in his ship off the bay of Tripoli. The Algerians sent out a force of small armed vessels propelled by sweeps to attack him. Eventually a favourable breeze sprang up, and Murray was able to counter-attack with such effect, that the Tripolitan vessels fled back to the safety of the harbour under the protection of shore batteries. Unfortunately, after only four months Murray was superseded by Captain Richard V. Morris, and ordered to return to the United States. He complained about his treatment to the naval authorities without effect, and remained unemployed for the next few years.

=== Later career ===
From July 1805 until late 1806, Murray commanded the frigate Adams, cruising along the eastern coast of the United States from New York to Florida protecting American commerce. In mid-1807, following the Chesapeake–Leopard affair, Murray applied for another sea-command, but was refused. Murray applied once more on the outbreak of the War of 1812, but was again rejected. Finally, in 1815, Murray was appointed Commandant of the Philadelphia Navy Yard, where he worked closely with chief shipwright Samuel Humphreys, and remained there until his death on October 6, 1821. He is buried in Laurel Hill Cemetery in Philadelphia.

== Personal life ==
Murray was married to Mary Miller, and had two sons, Magnus Miller Murray (twice Mayor of Pittsburgh) and Alexander M. Murray. Magnus's son, also Alexander, became a naval officer, achieving the rank of Rear Admiral.

== Legacy ==
- Two destroyers, USS Murray (DD-97) (1918-1936) and USS Murray (DD-576) (1943-1966) were named for him and his grandson Alexander Murray.
