= Harmar Denny =

American politician

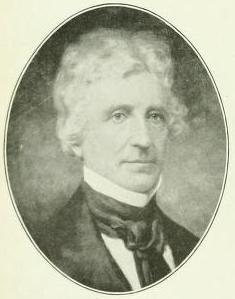

Member of the U.S. House of Representatives from Pennsylvania's 22nd district
- In office December 15, 1829 – March 3, 1837
- Preceded by: William Wilkins
- Succeeded by: Richard Biddle
- Constituency: 16th district (1829–1833); 22nd district (1833–1837)

Member of the Pennsylvania House of Representatives
- In office 1824-1829

Personal details
- Born: May 13, 1794 Pittsburgh, Pennsylvania, U.S.
- Died: January 29, 1852 (aged 57) Pittsburgh, Pennsylvania, U.S.
- Party: Anti-Masonic
- Parent: Ebenezer Denny

Harmar Denny (May 13, 1794 – January 29, 1852) was an American businessman and Anti-Masonic member of the U.S. House of Representatives from Pennsylvania.

== Biography ==
Harmar Denny was born in Pittsburgh, the son of Ebenezer Denny and Nancy Wilkins. His father had served as adjutant to General Harmar during wars on the western frontier.

Graduating from Dickinson College in Carlisle in 1813, Harmar Denny was admitted to the bar in Pennsylvania in 1816 and became a law partner with Henry Baldwin and practiced law in Pittsburgh.

He married Elizabeth F. O'Hara on November 25, 1817 and they had 11 children. Elizabeth was the daughter of General James O'Hara and Mary Carson O'Hara.

Denny served as a member of the Pennsylvania State House of Representatives from 1824 to 1829. In 1829 he became a ruling elder of the First Presbyterian Church of Pittsburgh.

Denny was elected as an Anti-Masonic candidate to the Twenty-first Congress to fill the vacancy caused by the resignation of William Wilkins. He was reelected to the Twenty-second through Twenty-fourth Congresses and served from December 15, 1829, to March 3, 1837. After his term, he resumed the practice of law in Pittsburgh, and became a delegate to the Pennsylvania State Constitutional Convention in 1837. He was a presidential elector on the Whig ticket in 1840. As commissioner under act of incorporation of the Pennsylvania Railroad, April 13, 1846, he incorporated the Ohio and Pennsylvania Railroad Company, 1848. He was admitted to the American Philosophical Society in 1848. In 1849 he was elected president of the common council of Pittsburgh. He declined the nomination to be a candidate for Congress in 1850. He served as president of the Pittsburgh and Steubenville Railroad in 1851 and 1852. He was a trustee of the Western University of Pennsylvania, now the University of Pittsburgh, and director of the Pittsburgh Theological Seminary.

He was buried at Allegheny Cemetery in Pittsburgh's Lawrenceville neighborhood.

New York State Senator Henry E. H. Brereton (1865–1957) was his grandson; Congressman Harmar D. Denny, Jr. (1886–1966) was his great-grandson.

The town of Harmarville, twelve miles up the Allegheny River, was named for him.

U.S. House of Representatives
Preceded by William Wilkins	Member of the U.S. House of Representatives from Pennsylvania's 16th congressional district 1829–1833	Succeeded by Joseph Biles Anthony
New district	Member of the U.S. House of Representatives from Pennsylvania's 22nd congressional district 1833–1837	Succeeded by Richard Biddle
