= John Wilkins Jr. =

United States Army general

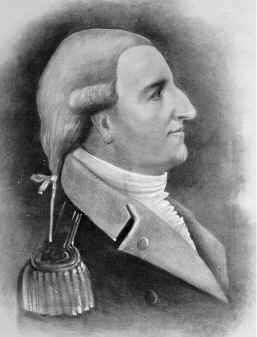
- Born: December 22, 1761; East Donegal, Pennsylvania
- Died: April 20, 1816 (aged 54)
- Conflicts: American Revolutionary War

John Wilkins Jr. (December 22, 1761 – April 20, 1816) was a United States Army officer who served as Quartermaster General of the United States Army from 1796 to 1802.

== Early life ==
Wilkins was born on December 22, 1761, in Donegal, now East Donegal, Pennsylvania, and raised in Carlisle. At age 15 the younger Wilkins enlisted for the American Revolution, and was assigned as Surgeon's Mate of the 4th Pennsylvania Regiment. He served in the position from April 8, 1780, until the close of the war on November 3, 1783. As a result of this service Wilkins earned the nickname "Doctor".

After the war Wilkins became a merchant and contractor in Pennsylvania and Presque Isle, Michigan, providing supplies and equipment to the United States Army in the Northwest Territory. In 1793 Governor Thomas Mifflin appointed Wilkins as Brigadier General of the Allegheny County Militia as part of Pennsylvania's response to the Whiskey Rebellion.

== Quartermaster General ==
President George Washington appointed Wilkins as Quartermaster General of the United States Army in June 1796. In October Wilkins attempted to resign, pleading the necessity of attending to personal business. His resignation was not accepted and he continued to serve, overseeing the supplying and equipping of an expanded Army in anticipation of war with France. Although the act of March 3, 1799, provided for a Quartermaster General with rank of major general, Wilkins was not appointed to that rank and served in the position as a civilian. The dispute with France was resolved without fighting, and Wilkins served until his position was abolished in March 1802 as part of a downsizing of the Army through the Military Peace Establishment Act.

== Later life ==
After leaving the Army, Wilkins returned to his business interests in Pennsylvania, including serving as President of the Pittsburgh branch of the Bank of Pennsylvania. Wilkins died in Pittsburgh on April 29, 1816. He was originally buried in the yard of Pittsburgh's First Presbyterian Church, and later interred in Pittsburgh's Homewood Cemetery.

== Family ==
Wilkins was the son of John Wilkins Sr. (1733 – 1810), a Captain in the American Revolution. He was the brother of Senator William Wilkins. He was the father of Mississippi banker James C. Wilkins and Michigan judge Ross Wilkins. His nephew Wilkins F. Tannehill (1787–1858), served as the mayor of Nashville, Tennessee, from 1825 to 1827.

== Legacy ==
The town of Wilkinsburg, Pennsylvania, is named for General Wilkins.
