= Walter Lowrie (politician) =

American politician (1784–1868)

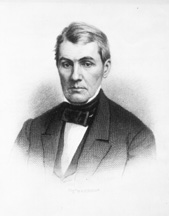

3rd Secretary of the United States Senate
- In office December 12, 1825 – December 5, 1836
- Preceded by: Charles Cutts
- Succeeded by: Asbury Dickins

United States Senator from Pennsylvania
- In office March 4, 1819 – March 4, 1825
- Preceded by: Abner Lacock
- Succeeded by: William Marks

Personal details
- Born: December 10, 1784 Edinburgh, Scotland
- Died: December 14, 1868 (aged 84) New York City, U.S.
- Party: Democratic-Republican

Walter Lowrie (December 10, 1784 – December 14, 1868) was a politician from Butler County, Pennsylvania. He served in both houses in the state legislature and represented Pennsylvania in the United States Senate. Serving as chairman of the Committee on Finance during the 2nd session of the 17th Congress.

After his term as a Senator, Lowrie stayed on as secretary of the Senate for eleven years. In 1836 he moved to New York City and went to work with the Missionary Board of the Presbyterian Church. He remained with them until his death. Three of his sons, John Cameron, Walter Macon, and Reuben, were prominent as missionaries to India and China. A nephew, Walter H. Lowrie, later served as chief justice of Pennsylvania's Supreme Court.

Lowrie died in New York City on December 14, 1868, and is interred in the First Presbyterian Church in Manhattan.

== See also ==
- List of United States senators born outside the United States

U.S. Senate
Preceded by Abner Lacock	U.S. senator (Class 3) from Pennsylvania; 1819–1825; Served alongside: Jonathan Roberts, William Findlay	Succeeded by William Marks
Political offices
Preceded by John Holmes; Maine	Chairman of the U.S. Senate Committee on Finance; 1822–1823	Succeeded by Samuel Smith; Maryland
Honorary titles
Preceded by Henry Johnson	Most senior living U.S. senator (Sitting or former); September 4, 1864 – December 14, 1868	Succeeded by Peleg Sprague
