= William Wilkins (American politician) =

American judge and politician (1779–1865)

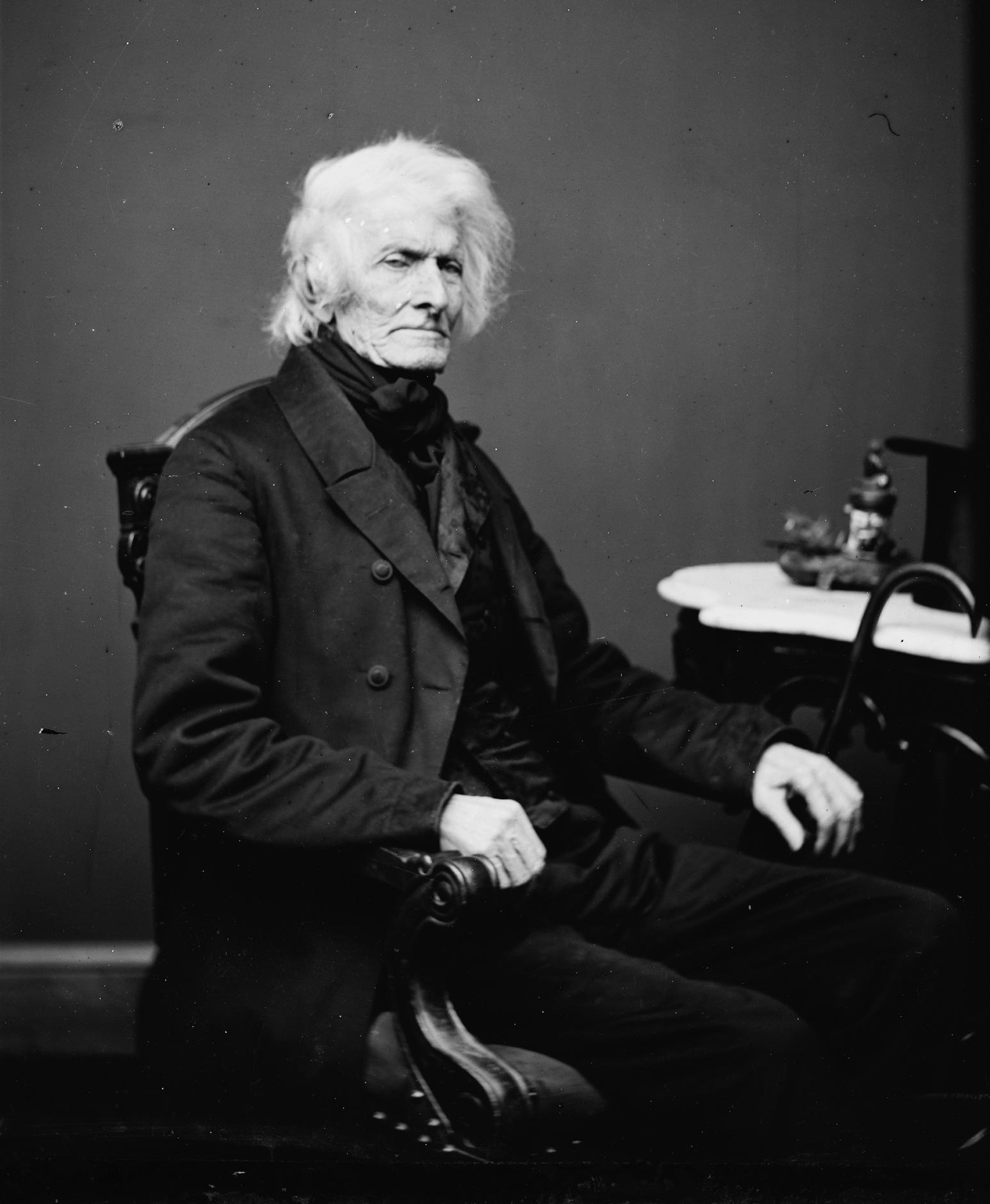

Member of the Pennsylvania State Senate from the 22nd district
- In office 1857–1858
- Preceded by: Jonas R. McClintock
- Succeeded by: Jacob Turney

19th United States Secretary of War
- In office February 15, 1844 – March 4, 1845
- President: John Tyler
- Preceded by: James Madison Porter
- Succeeded by: William L. Marcy

Chairman of the House Judiciary Committee
- In office 1843–1844
- Preceded by: Daniel D. Barnard
- Succeeded by: Romulus Mitchell Saunders

Member of the U.S. House of Representatives from Pennsylvania's 21st district
- In office March 4, 1843 – February 14, 1844
- Preceded by: Thomas McKennan
- Succeeded by: Cornelius Darragh

United States Minister to Russia
- In office December 14, 1834 – December 24, 1835
- President: Andrew Jackson
- Preceded by: James Buchanan
- Succeeded by: John Randolph Clay (acting)

United States Senator from Pennsylvania
- In office March 4, 1831 – June 30, 1834
- Preceded by: William Marks
- Succeeded by: James Buchanan

Judge of the United States District Court for the Western District of Pennsylvania
- In office May 12, 1824 – April 14, 1831
- Appointed by: James Monroe
- Preceded by: Jonathan Hoge Walker
- Succeeded by: Thomas Irwin

Member of the Pennsylvania House of Representatives
- In office 1819-1820

Personal details
- Born: William Wilkins; December 20, 1779 Carlisle, Pennsylvania, U.S.
- Died: June 23, 1865 (aged 85) Pittsburgh, Pennsylvania, U.S.
- Party: Jacksonian Democrat
- Other political affiliations: Federalist
- Relations: John Wilkins Jr. Ross Wilkins
- Education: Dickinson College read law

William Wilkins (December 20, 1779 – June 23, 1865) was an American judge and politician from Pennsylvania who served as a Jacksonian member of the United States Senate from 1831 to 1834 and as a Democratic member of the United States House of Representatives for Pennsylvania's 21st congressional district from 1843 to 1844. He served as a member of both houses of the Pennsylvania General Assembly, a United States district judge of the United States District Court for the Western District of Pennsylvania, United States Minister to Russia and the 19th United States Secretary of War.

== Early life and education ==
Wilkins was born on December 20, 1779, in Carlisle, Pennsylvania, to Captain John Wilkins, a captain in the American Revolution, and Catherine Rowan. Wilkins attended the Pittsburgh Academy, the forerunner of the University of Pittsburgh. He read law in 1801, and graduated from Dickinson College in 1802. He was admitted to the bar and entered private practice in Pittsburgh, Pennsylvania from 1801 to 1806. He was "second" in a duel in 1806 which resulted in the death of Tarleton Bates. It was the last recorded duel in Pennsylvania after the Pennsylvania General Assembly outlawed the practice. Bates was very popular and Wilkins left Pennsylvania due to the duel to live with his brother Charles Wilkins in Lexington, Kentucky.

He continued private practice in Lexington, Kentucky from 1806 to 1807. He resumed private practice in Pittsburgh from 1808 to 1815. He assisted in organizing the Pittsburgh Manufacturing Company in 1810. He was the first President of the Bank of Pittsburgh. He was President of the Pittsburgh City Council from 1816 to 1819. He was a Federalist member of the Pennsylvania House of Representatives from 1819 to 1820. He was President Judge of the Pennsylvania Court of Common Pleas for the Fifth Judicial District from 1820 to 1824.

In the 1820s, Wilkins and George M. Dallas were leaders in the Family Party faction of the Democratic Party. The faction was named Family Party since Wilkins, Dallas and several other key leaders were all related by marriage. The Family Party had political strength and were able to place the defeated governor William Findlay as a U.S. senator in 1821.

== Federal judicial service ==
Wilkins was nominated by President James Monroe on May 10, 1824, to a seat on the United States District Court for the Western District of Pennsylvania vacated by Judge Jonathan Hoge Walker. He was confirmed by the United States Senate on May 12, 1824, and received his commission the same day. His service terminated on April 14, 1831, due to his resignation.

=== Congressional races during his judicial tenure ===
Wilkins was an unsuccessful candidate for election in 1826 to the 20th United States Congress. He was elected as a Jacksonian Democrat to the 21st United States Congress, but resigned before qualifying, never taking his seat.

== United States Senate and diplomatic service ==
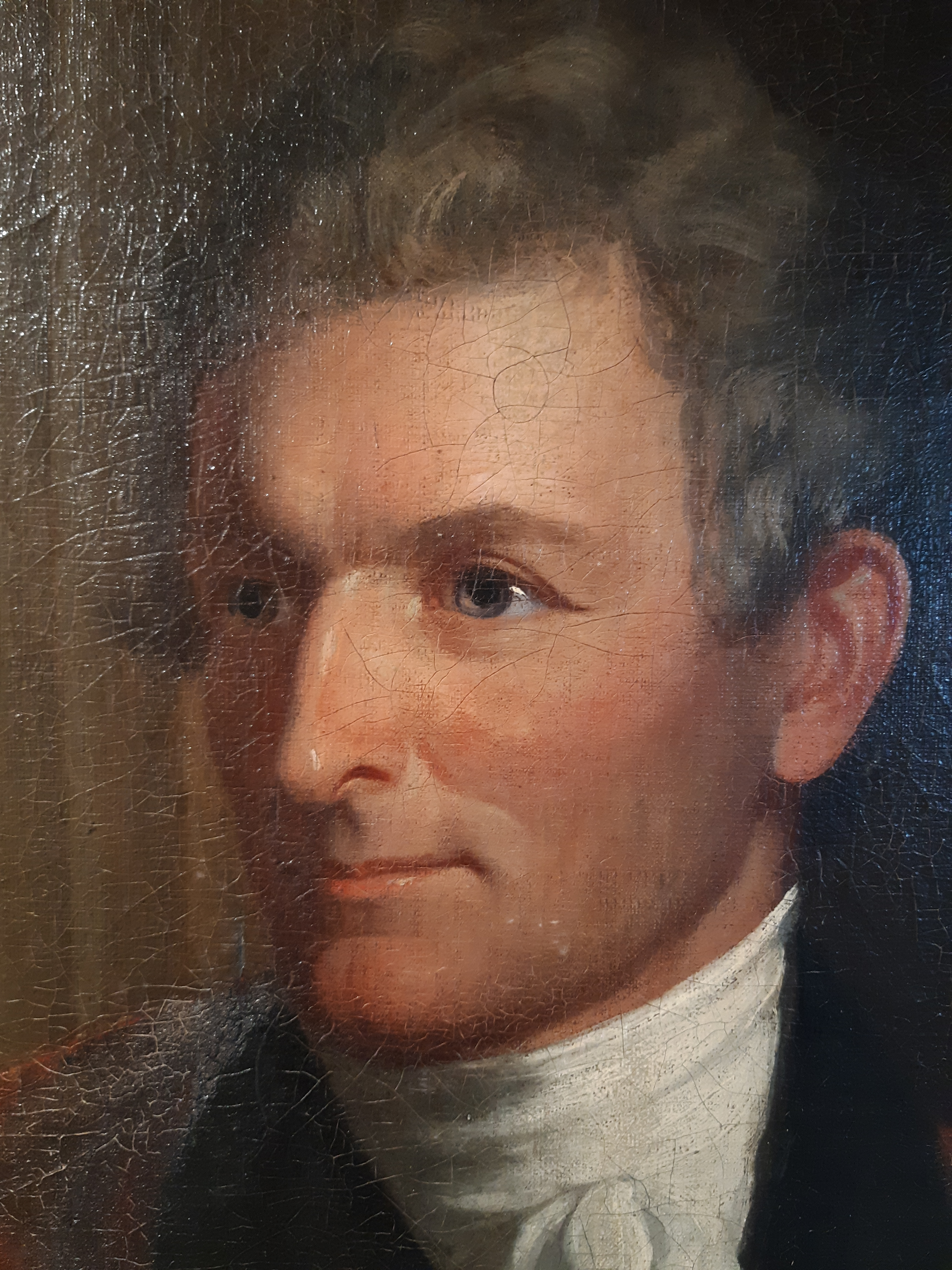
William Wilkins in 1834 when he served in the U.S. Senate from PA painted by James Bowman.

Wilkins was elected as a Jacksonian Democrat to the United States Senate from Pennsylvania and served from March 4, 1831, to June 30, 1834, when he resigned. He was Chairman of the United States Senate Committee on the Judiciary from the 22nd United States Congress and Chairman of the United States Senate Committee on Foreign Relations for the 23rd United States Congress. Following his departure from Congress, Wilkins served as United States Minister to Russia for the United States Department of State from 1834 to 1836. He resumed private practice in Pittsburgh from 1836 to 1843. He was an unsuccessful candidate for election to the 27th United States Congress in 1840.

== 1832 election ==
Though he was not a candidate for the vice-presidency in 1832, all 30 electors from Pennsylvania voted for him for vice president anyway due to internal party disputes. National party nominee Martin Van Buren's views on the Bank recharter and tariffs made him unpopular in the state and at the state convention the party nominated Wilkins as their Vice-Presidential candidate. He came in third place overall, but did not cost Van Buren enough electors to lose or even to force a contingent election. It sets the mark for the most faithless electors won by a person without the death of a nominee.

== United States House service ==
Wilkins was elected as a Democrat from Pennsylvania's 21st congressional district to the United States House of Representatives of the 28th United States Congress and served from December 4, 1843, to February 14, 1844, when he resigned. He was Chairman of the United States House Committee on the Judiciary for the 28th United States Congress.

== Later career ==
Wilkins was appointed as the 19th United States Secretary of War by President John Tyler, serving from 1844 to 1845. Wilkins was aboard the USS Princeton when one of its guns exploded in 1843 near Mount Vernon. The explosion killed two members of John Tyler's cabinet. Wilkins had expressed disapproval of the firing and had moved away from the gun moments before the explosion.

He resumed private practice in Pittsburgh starting in 1845. He was a member of the Pennsylvania State Senate for the 22nd district from 1857 to 1858. He again resumed private practice in Pittsburgh from 1858 to 1865. He was a major general of the Pennsylvania Home Guards in 1862.

== Death ==
Wilkins died on June 23, 1865, in Homewood, now a neighborhood in Pittsburgh.

== Family ==
Wilkins married Catherine Holmes however she died in 1816 and he was remarried to Mathilda Dallas. Wilkins' brother John Wilkins Jr. served as a major general in the United States Army. His sister, Nancy, married Ebenezer Denny, the first mayor of Pittsburgh. His nephew, Harmar Denny, was a U.S. Congressman from Pennsylvania. His nephew, Ross Wilkins, was a notable jurist in Michigan.

== Legacy ==
Wilkins founded the Pittsburgh neighborhood of Homewood in 1832.

He is the namesake of Wilkins Township, Allegheny County, Pennsylvania.

== Sources ==
- United States Congress. "William Wilkins (id: W000475)". Biographical Directory of the United States Congress.
- William Wilkins at the Biographical Directory of Federal Judges, a publication of the Federal Judicial Center.

Pennsylvania House of Representatives
Preceded by	Member of the Pennsylvania House of Representatives; 1819-1820	Succeeded by
Legal offices
Preceded by Jonathan Hoge Walker	Judge of the United States District Court for the Western District of Pennsylvania; 1824–1831	Succeeded by Thomas Irwin
U.S. Senate
Preceded by William Marks	United States Senator (Class 3) from Pennsylvania; 1831–1834	Succeeded by James Buchanan
Preceded by William L. Marcy	Chairman of the Senate Judiciary Committee; 1832–1833	Succeeded by John M. Clayton
Preceded by John Forsyth	Chairman of the Senate Foreign Relations Committee; 1833–1834	Succeeded by Henry Clay
Diplomatic posts
Preceded by James Buchanan	United States Minister to Russia; 1834–1835	Succeeded by John Randolph Clay (acting)
U.S. House of Representatives
Preceded by Thomas McKean Thompson McKennan	United States Representative from Pennsylvania's 21st congressional district 1843–1844	Succeeded by Cornelius Darragh
Preceded by Daniel D. Barnard	Chairman of the House Judiciary Committee; 1843–1844	Succeeded by Romulus Mitchell Saunders
Political offices
Preceded by James Madison Porter	United States Secretary of War; 1844–1845	Succeeded by William L. Marcy
Pennsylvania State Senate
Preceded by Jonas R. McClintock	Member of the Pennsylvania Senate, 22nd district 1857-1858	Succeeded by Jacob Turney
Honorary titles
Preceded by Littleton Waller Tazewell	Oldest living United States senator 1860–1865	Succeeded by Henry Dodge
