= 107th New York Infantry Regiment =

- Active: July 18, 1862 to June 5, 1865
- Country: United States
- Allegiance: Union
- Branch: Infantry
- Engagements: Battle of Antietam; Battle of Chancellorsville; Battle of Gettysburg; Atlanta campaign Battle of Resaca; Battle of New Hope Church; Battle of Allatoona; Battle of Kennesaw Mountain; Battle of Peachtree Creek; Siege of Atlanta; Sherman's March to the Sea; Carolinas campaign Battle of Averasborough; Battle of Bentonville

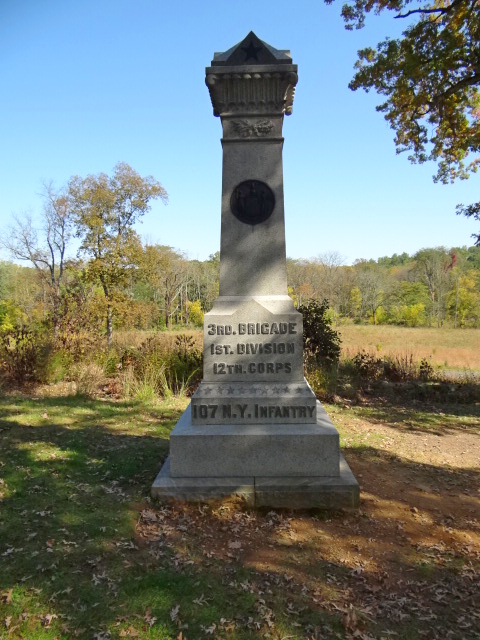
The monument to the 107th New York Volunteers at Gettysburg

The 107th New York Infantry Regiment (a.k.a. "Campbell Guards") was an infantry regiment in the Union Army during the American Civil War.

== Service ==
The 107th New York Infantry was organized at Elmira, New York beginning July 18, 1862 and mustered in for a three-year enlistment on August 13, 1862, under the command of Colonel Robert B. Van Valkenburgh.

The regiment was attached to Whipple's Command, Defenses of Washington, D.C., to September 1862. 3rd Brigade, 1st Division, XII Corps, Army of the Potomac, to October 1863, and Army of the Cumberland, to April 1864. 2nd Brigade, 1st Division, XX Corps, Army of the Cumberland, to June 1865.

The 107th New York Infantry mustered out of service on June 5, 1865. Veterans and recruits were transferred to the 60th New York Infantry.

== Detailed service ==
Left New York for Washington, D.C., August 13, 1862. Maryland Campaign September 6–22, 1862. Battle of Antietam, Md., September 16–17. Duty at Maryland Heights September 22-October 29. Picket duty at Blackford's Ford and Sharpsburg until December. Marched to Fredericksburg, Va., December 12–16. "Mud March" January 20–24, 1863. At Stafford Court House until April 27. Chancellorsville Campaign April 27-May 6. Battle of Chancellorsville May 1–5. Gettysburg Campaign June 11-July 24. Battle of Gettysburg July 1–3. Pursuit of Lee to Warrenton Junction July 5–26. Duty on line of the Rappahannock until September. Movement to Bridgeport, Ala., September 24-October 3. Guarding the Nashville & Chattanooga Railroad until April 1864. Atlanta Campaign May 1-September 8. Operations about Rocky Faced Ridge, Tunnel Hill, and Buzzard's Roost Gap May 8–11. Battle of Resaca May 14–15. Near Cassville May 19. New Hope Church May 25. Battles about Dallas, New Hope Church, and Allatoona Hills May 26-June 5. Operations about Marietta and against Kennesaw Mountain June 10-July 2. Pine Hill June 11–14. Lost Mountain June 15–17. Gilgal or Golgotha Church June 15. Muddy Creek June 17. Noyes Creek June 19. Kolb's Farm June 22. Assault on Kennesaw June 27. Ruff's Station, Smyrna Camp Ground, July 4. Chattahoochie River July 5–17. Peach Tree Creek July 19–20. Siege of Atlanta July 22-August 25. Operations at Chattahoochie River Bridge August 26-September 2. Occupation of Atlanta September 2-November 15. Expedition from Atlanta to Tuckum's Cross Roads October 26–29. Near Atlanta November 9. March to the sea November 15-December 10. Montieth Swamp December 9. Siege of Savannah December 10–21. Carolinas Campaign January to April 1865. Robertsville, S.C., January 29. Averasboro, N.C., March 16. Battle of Bentonville March 19–21. Occupation of Goldsboro March 24, and of Raleigh April 14. Moccasin Swamp April 10. Bennett's House April 26. Surrender of Johnston and his army. Marched to Washington, D.C., via Richmond, Va., April 29-May 19. Grand Review of the Armies May 24.

== Casualties ==
The regiment lost a total of 222 men during service; 4 officers and 87 enlisted men killed or mortally wounded, 131 enlisted men died of disease.

== Commanders ==
- Colonel Robert B. Van Valkenburgh - resigned September 22, 1862 to take a seat in Congress
- Colonel Alexander S. Diven - honorably discharged May 11, 1863 to take a seat in Congress
- Colonel Nirom M. Crane

== See also ==
- List of New York Civil War regiments
- New York in the Civil War
