= Alfred Wells =

American politician

Member of the U.S. House of Representatives from New York's 27th district
- In office March 4, 1859 – March 3, 1861
- Preceded by: John M. Parker
- Succeeded by: Alexander S. Diven

Personal details
- Born: May 27, 1814 Dagsboro, Delaware, U.S.
- Died: July 18, 1867 (aged 53) Ithaca, New York, U.S.
- Party: Republican
- Other political affiliations: Anti-Nebraska Party (1854-1859)

Alfred Wells (May 27, 1814 – July 18, 1867) was a U.S. representative from New York.

== Biography ==
Alfred Wells was born in Dagsboro, Sussex County, Delaware on May 27, 1814. He pursued classical studies, and later studied law in the office of Charles Humphrey and David Woodcock. He was admitted to the bar in 1837 and commenced practice in Ithaca, New York.

Wells became active in politics as an anti-slavery Democrat, and was one of the owners of the Ithaca Journal and Advertiser, a Democratic newspaper, from 1839 to 1853.

He served as District Attorney of Tompkins County from 1845 to 1847, and was Judge of the Tompkins County Court from 1847 to 1851. He continued his anti-slavery activism by joining the Anti-Nebraska Party and attending its conventions in Saratoga and Auburn in 1854.

Like most members of the short-lived Anti-Nebraska Party, Wells became a Republican before 1860. He was elected to represent the 27th Congressional District in the 36th Congress (March 4, 1859 – March 3, 1861). He was an unsuccessful candidate for renomination in 1860.

In 1862 Wells was appointed federal revenue assessor for the district which included Ithaca, responsible for the taxes enacted to finance the Union effort during the American Civil War, and served until his death.

Wells died in Ithaca on July 18, 1867. He was interred in the City Cemetery.

== Sources ==
- United States Congress. "Alfred Wells (id: W000280)". Biographical Directory of the United States Congress.
- Alfred Wells at Political Graveyard

U.S. House of Representatives
Preceded by John M. Parker	Member of the U.S. House of Representatives from New York's 27th congressional district March 4, 1859 – March 3, 1861	Succeeded by Alexander S. Diven
