= Alexander S. Diven =

American politician

Alexander Samuel Diven
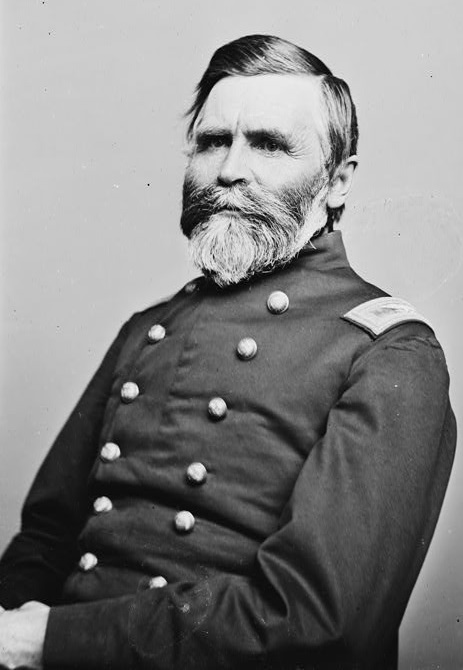
- Diven as Colonel of the 107th New York Infantry Regiment, 1863

Member of the New York Senate from the 20th district
- In office 1858–1859
- Preceded by: John E. Paterson
- Succeeded by: Samuel H. Hammond

Member of the U.S. House of Representatives from New York's 27th district
- In office March 4, 1861 – March 3, 1863
- Preceded by: Alfred Wells
- Succeeded by: Robert B. Van Valkenburgh

Personal details
- Born: February 10, 1809 Catharine, New York, U.S.
- Died: June 11, 1896 (aged 87) Elmira, New York, U.S.
- Resting place: Woodlawn Cemetery
- Party: Republican
- Spouse: Amanda Beers (m. 1835)
- Children: 8, including John M. Diven

Military service
- Allegiance: United States
- Branch/service: United States Army; Union Army
- Years of service: August 13, 1862 – May 11, 1863
- Rank: Colonel; Bvt. Brigadier General
- Commands: 107th New York Infantry Regiment
- Battles/wars: American Civil War

Alexander Samuel Diven (February 10, 1809 – June 11, 1896) was an American politician from New York and an officer in the Union Army during the American Civil War.

== Biography ==
Born in Catharine, New York, Diven attended the common schools and the academies in Penn Yan and Ovid, New York, and then studied law. He was admitted to the bar in 1831, and commenced practice in Elmira. He was member of the New York State Senate (27th District) in 1858 and 1859.

Diven was elected as a Republican to the 37th United States Congress, holding office from March 4, 1861, to March 3, 1863. Strongly opposed to slavery, he was the first to draft and introduce measures for the recruitment of colored troops in the Union Army.

Diven entered the Army on August 13, 1862, as lieutenant colonel of the 107th New York Infantry Regiment. He was promoted to colonel on October 21, 1862. He was granted leave of absence from the Army for ninety days to take his seat in Congress. He was honorably discharged as colonel May 11, 1863, and later brevetted brigadier general of Volunteers April 30, 1864. He spoke at the dedication of the monument honoring the 107th New York in 1869. He engaged in railroad building and operation from 1865 to 1875, and was prominently identified with the Erie Railroad.

In the 1870s Pennsylvania native Truckson LaFrance obtained several patents on improvements he developed in the rotary steam engine. John Vischer, head of the Elmira Union Iron Works, became interested and was convinced by LaFrance to back him in the manufacture of a steam fire engine. They subsequently formed a business partnership to manufacture fire apparatus.

Their success attracted the attention of Diven and his four sons, who bought the company in April 1873. They renamed LaFrance Manufacturing Company and appointed John Vischer as a Director and Truckson LaFrance as the company's Mechanical Engineer. Within three months, the new company bought 10 acres of land and built a plant to manufacture steam engines and related equipment, including railroad locomotives.

General Diven was married, in 1835, to Miss Amanda Beers, of Elmira, and had four sons and four daughters. He died in Elmira, New York, on June 11, 1896, and was buried at Woodlawn Cemetery.

His daughter, May, married U.S. Army officer Emerson H. Liscum on September 4, 1867.

Diven Elementary School in the Elmira City School District is named in honor of his son, George.

== Sources ==
- United States Congress. "Alexander S. Diven (id: D000364)". Biographical Directory of the United States Congress.

New York State Senate
Preceded by John E. Paterson	New York State Senate; 20th District; 1858–1859	Succeeded by Samuel H. Hammond
U.S. House of Representatives
Preceded by Alfred Wells	Member of the U.S. House of Representatives from New York's 27th congressional district 1861–1863	Succeeded by Robert B. Van Valkenburgh
