= Charles E. DeLong =

American politician and diplomat

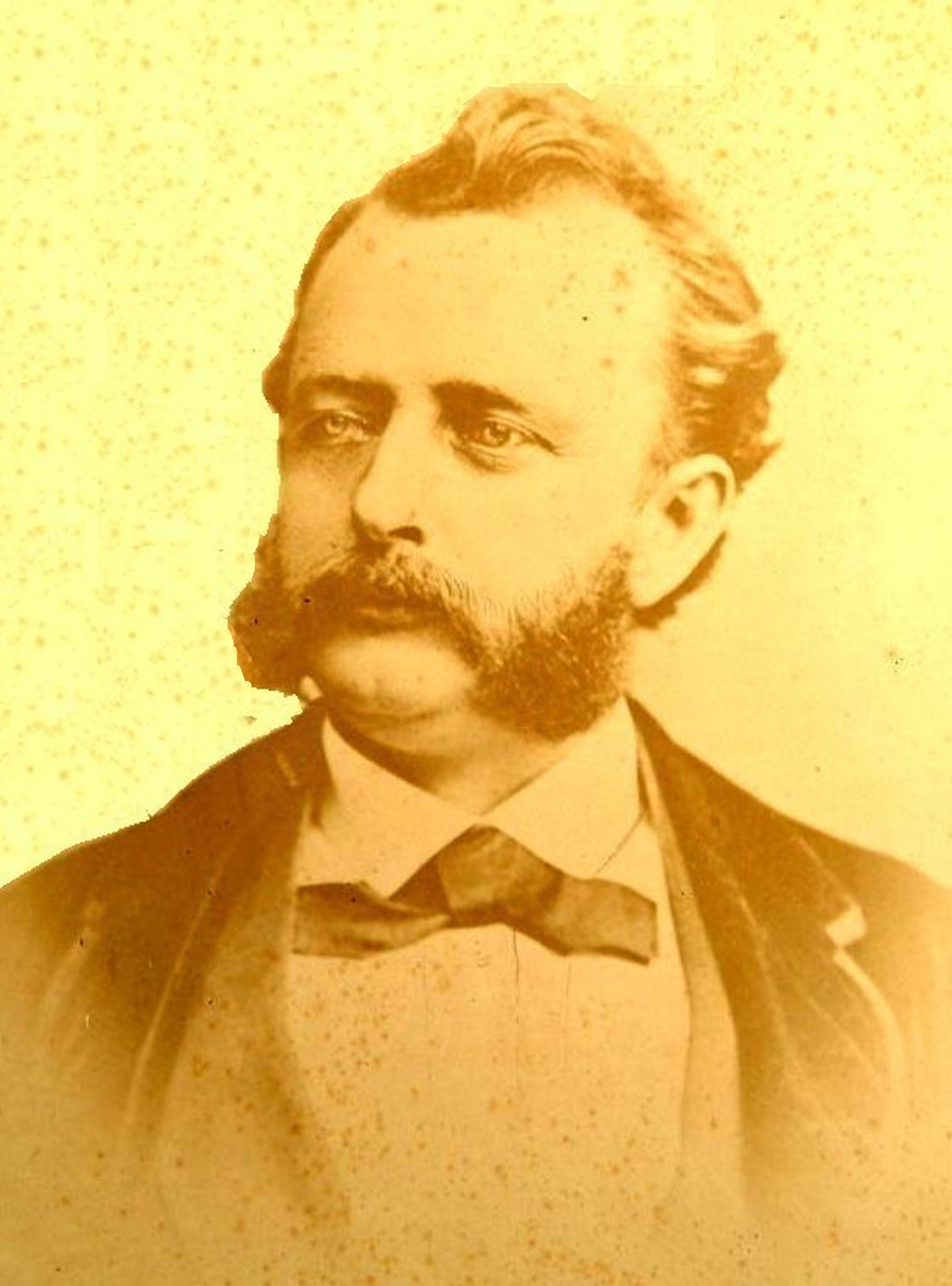
- Born: August 13, 1832
- Died: October 26, 1876 (aged 44)
- Spouse: Elida DeLong

Charles Egbert DeLong (August 13, 1832 – October 26, 1876) was an American diplomat who served as the Envoy to Japan during the mid-19th century.

== Early life ==
DeLong was a native of New York. He relocated with his family to California before he turned twenty. About 1851 he is reported to have been running a store at Foster Bar. He learned Chinese to communicate with the Chinese patrons. By 1853, he owned several gold claims on the Yuba River in Nevada County. While serving as a tax collector, DeLong shot a Chinese man. He was initially convicted, but the conviction was later overturned and he was acquitted. He was elected Deputy Sheriff and admitted to the bar in 1857. The same year, he was elected to the California State Assembly from Yuba County, and served for two terms.

== Diplomat in Japan ==
In 1869, DeLong travelled to Japan with his wife Elida and two small children. On November 11, 1869, DeLong presented his credentials to Emperor Meiji of Japan as Resident Minister of the United States Consulate in Japan. In the name of the United States, he recognized the legitimacy of Japan's sovereignty over the Ryukyu Islands.

DeLong accompanied the Iwakura Mission on its visit to the United States in 1871. His wife Elida DeLong chaperoned five Japanese girls who were sent to attend American schools as part of the mission. Also in 1871, he negotiated a trade agreement between Hawaii and Japan.

In 1872, he and Elida returned to Japan, now with three small children. They brought with them three servants, three horses, a carriage, and a sewing machine, but struggled to find acceptable accommodations, ultimately maintaining a house in Yokohama a half-day's travel from DeLong's office in Tokyo. After his return to Japan, DeLong recommended the employment of fellow American Charles LeGendre as a foreign advisor to the Japanese Ministry of Foreign Affairs, partly to influence the Japanese government to take a more aggressive stance against China, thus preventing the 1871 treaty between Japan and China from turning into a Sino-Japanese alliance against the western powers

His position was elevated to that of Envoy Extraordinary and Minister Plenipotentiary on June 9, 1872. He continued to serve in that capacity to October 7, 1873, although his career was marked by considerable friction with his superiors in Washington, who often accused him of overstepping his authority.

== Later life ==
After his return to California from Japan in 1874, he resumed the practice of law at Virginia City, Nevada. He died of typhoid fever in 1876.

== Notes ==
Diplomatic posts
Preceded by Robert B. Van Valkenburg	Envoy Extraordinary and Minister Plenipotentiary to Japan; 1869–1873	Succeeded by John Bingham
