= Robert B. Van Valkenburgh =

American judge

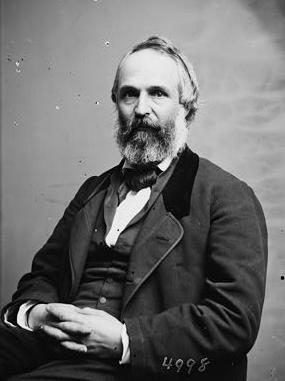

United States Ambassador to Japan
- In office May 4, 1867 – November 11, 1869
- President: Andrew Johnson; Ulysses S. Grant
- Preceded by: Robert H. Pruyn
- Succeeded by: Charles E. DeLong

Member of the U.S. House of Representatives from New York
- In office March 4, 1861 – March 3, 1865
- Preceded by: William Irvine
- Succeeded by: Hamilton Ward
- Constituency: 28th district (1861–1863); 27th district (1863–1865)

Personal details
- Born: September 4, 1821 Prattsburgh, New York, U.S.
- Died: August 1, 1888 (aged 66) Suwannee Springs, Floridia, U.S.

Military service
- Allegiance: United States (Union
- Branch/service: Union Army
- Years of service: 1862
- Rank: Colonel
- Commands: 107th New York Volunteer Infantry
- Battles/wars: American Civil War: Battle of Antietam.

Robert Bruce Van Valkenburgh (September 4, 1821 – August 1, 1888) was a United States representative from New York, officer in the Union Army during the American Civil War, and subsequent US Minister Resident to Japan.

== Biography ==
Born in Prattsburgh, Steuben County, New York, he attended Franklin Academy there. He studied law, was admitted to the bar, and commenced practice in Bath. He was a member of the New York State Assembly (Steuben Co., 1st D.) in 1852, 1857 and 1858. In 1858, he was the Republican candidate for Speaker, but was defeated by Democrat Thomas G. Alvord on the 53rd ballot.

Van Valkenburgh was in command of the recruiting depot in Elmira and organized seventeen regiments early in the Civil War. He was elected as a Republican to the 37th and 38th United States Congresses, holding office from March 4, 1861, to March 3, 1865. While in the House he was Chairman of the Committee on Militia (37th and 38th Congresses). He served as colonel of the 107th New York Volunteer Infantry, and was its commander at the Battle of Antietam.

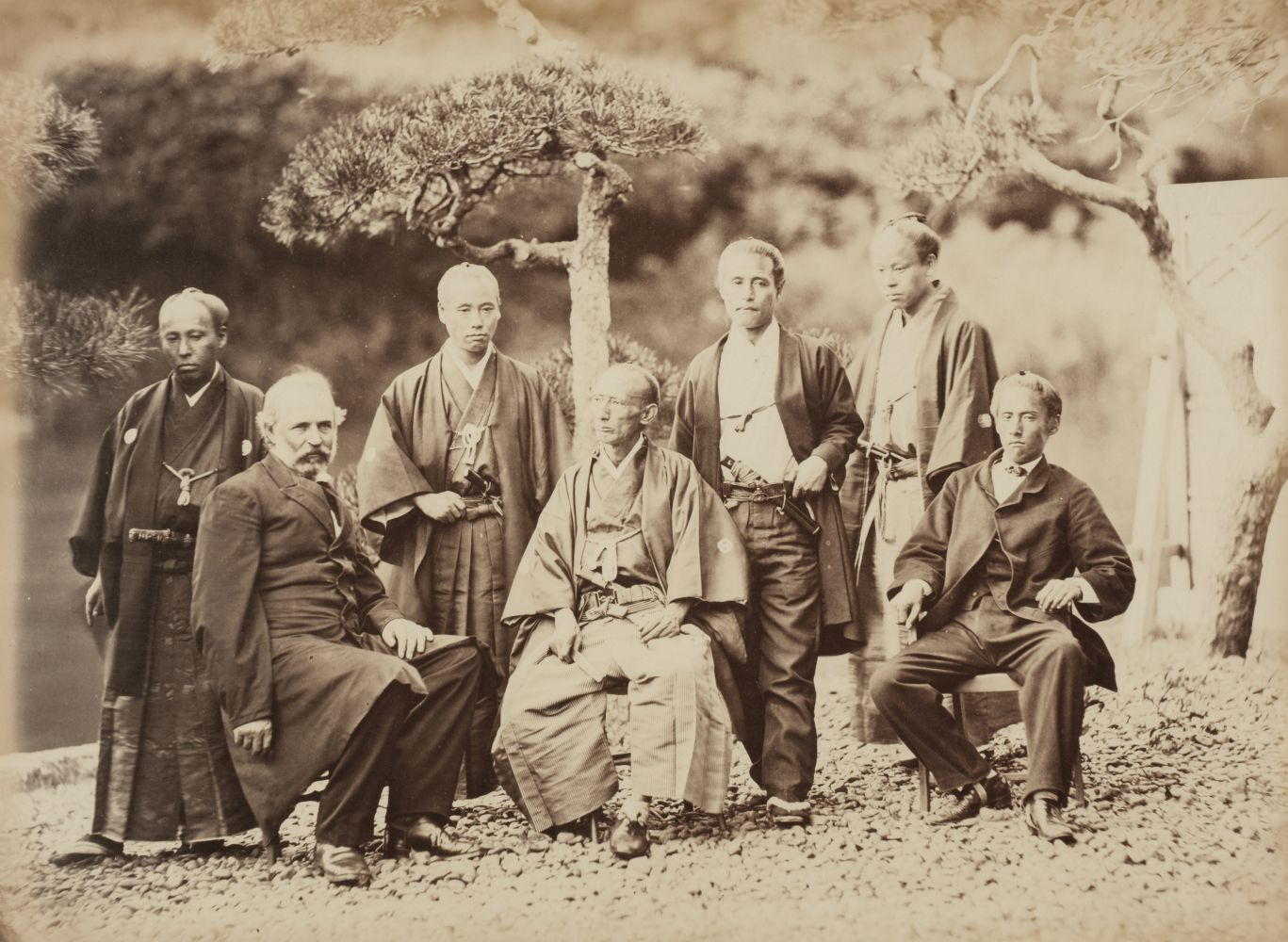
Van Valkenburgh (second from left) with Inaba Masami the daimyō of Tateyama Domain (center), during Van Valkenburgh's term as Minister Resident to Japan (1867)

Following the war, he was Acting Commissioner of Indian Affairs in 1865. He was appointed Minister Resident to Japan on January 18, 1866, and remained on the post until November 11, 1869. It was in his role as Minister Resident in Japan that Van Valkenburgh prevented the delivery of the CSS Stonewall to the forces of the Tokugawa clan during the Boshin War.

After his return from Japan, Van Valkenburgh settled in Florida, and was appointed associate justice of the Florida Supreme Court on May 20, 1874. He remained on the bench until his death in Suwannee Springs, near Live Oak in 1888. He was buried at the same cemetery of his wife, Anna Van Aleknburg (née Simpson), Old St. Nicholas Cemetery, on the south side of the St. Johns River, in Jacksonville.

New York State Assembly
Preceded by Charles G. Higby	New York State Assembly; Steuben County, 1st District; 1852	Succeeded by Dryden Henderson
Preceded by Goldsmith Denniston	New York State Assembly; Steuben County, 1st District; 1857–1858	Succeeded by Abel Eveland
U.S. House of Representatives
Preceded by William Irvine	Member of the U.S. House of Representatives from New York's 28th congressional district 1861–1863	Succeeded by Freeman Clarke
Preceded by Alexander S. Diven	Member of the U.S. House of Representatives from New York's 27th congressional district 1863–1865	Succeeded by Hamilton Ward
Diplomatic posts
Preceded by Robert H. Pruyn	U.S. Minister to Japan; 1866–1869	Succeeded by Charles E. DeLong
