= Samuel H. Hammond =

American politician

Samuel Haight Hammond (March 12, 1809 in Bath, Steuben County, New York – November 27, 1878 in Watertown, Jefferson County, New York) was an American lawyer, writer, newspaper editor and politician from New York.

== Life ==
Hammond was the son of Lazarus Hammond, the founder of Hammondsport. On September 3, 1828, he married Emeline Anne Humphrey (1808–1873), granddaughter of Congressman Reuben Humphrey (1757–1831), and they had six children. He studied law, was admitted to the bar, and practiced.

He entered politics as an Abolitionist, then joined successively the Democratic Party, the Whig Party, the Whigs' Silver Grey faction, the American Party and finally became a Republican.

About 1844, Hammond moved to Albany. He was District Attorney of Albany County from 1848 to 1850. In 1853, he became the editor of the Albany State Register. One of the partners in his Hammond, King & Barnes firm was William Barnes Sr., who later served as New York's first Superintendent of Insurance.

In 1856, he returned to Bath and resumed the practice of law. He was a member of the New York State Senate (27th D.) in 1860 and 1861.

In 1864, he moved to Watertown, and there he died and was buried at the Brookside Cemetery.

== Sources ==
- The New York Civil List compiled by Franklin Benjamin Hough, Stephen C. Hutchins and Edgar Albert Werner (1867; pg. 442 and 529)
- Biographical Sketches of the State Officers and Members of the Legislature of the State of New York by William D. Murphy (1861; pg. 61ff)
- Samuel H. Hammond at Northern Illinois University Library

New York State Senate
Preceded by Alexander S. Diven	New York State Senate; 27th District; 1860–1861	Succeeded by Charles Cook
