= American LaFrance =

Defunct American firetruck manufacturer

- Industry: Fire apparatus manufacturer, commercial vehicles
- Founded: 1873; 153 years ago
- Defunct: January 17, 2014; 12 years ago
- Headquarters: Summerville, South Carolina, U.S.
- Owner: Daimler Trucks North America
- Parent: Daimler AG

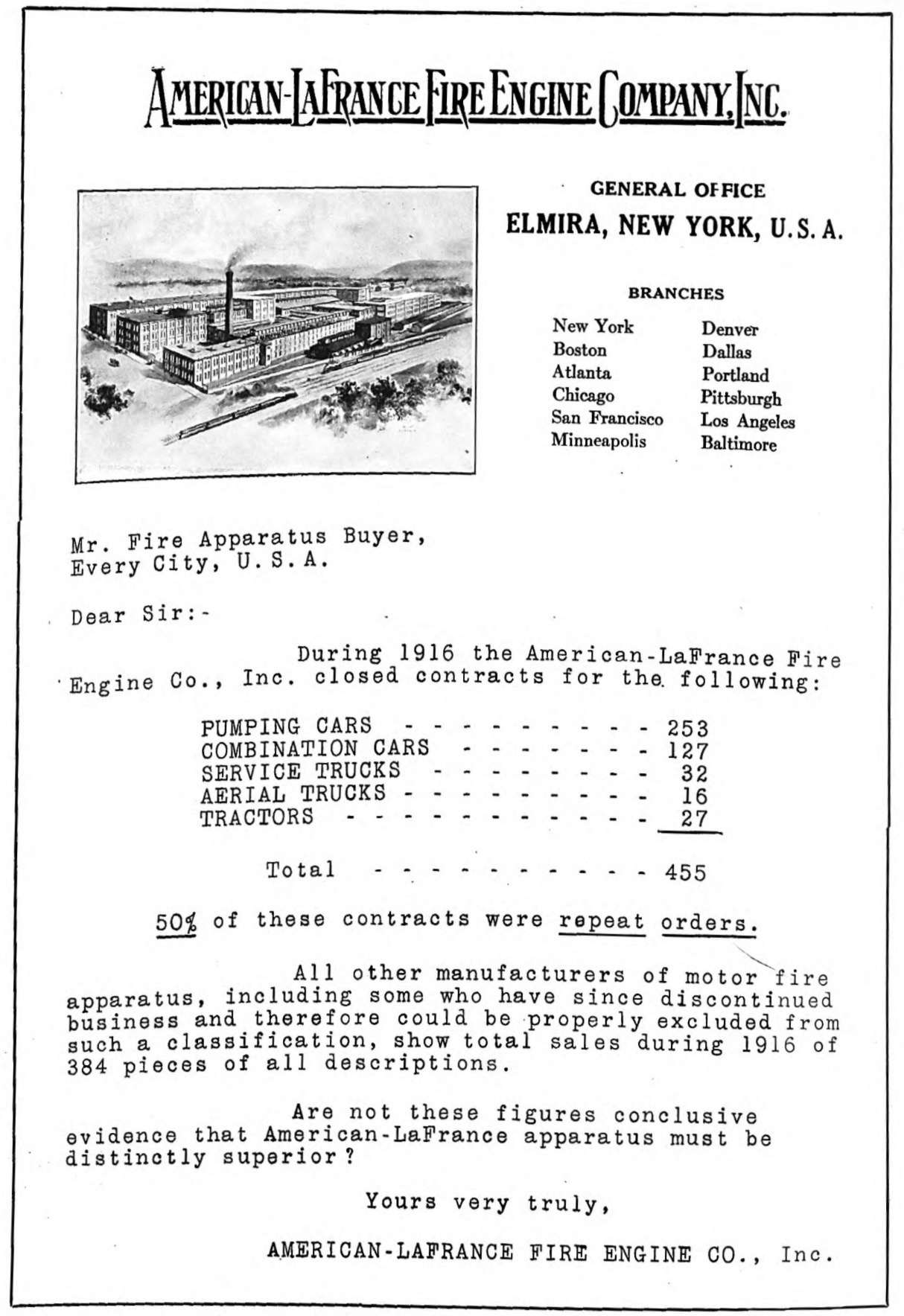
American LaFrance contracts in 1916

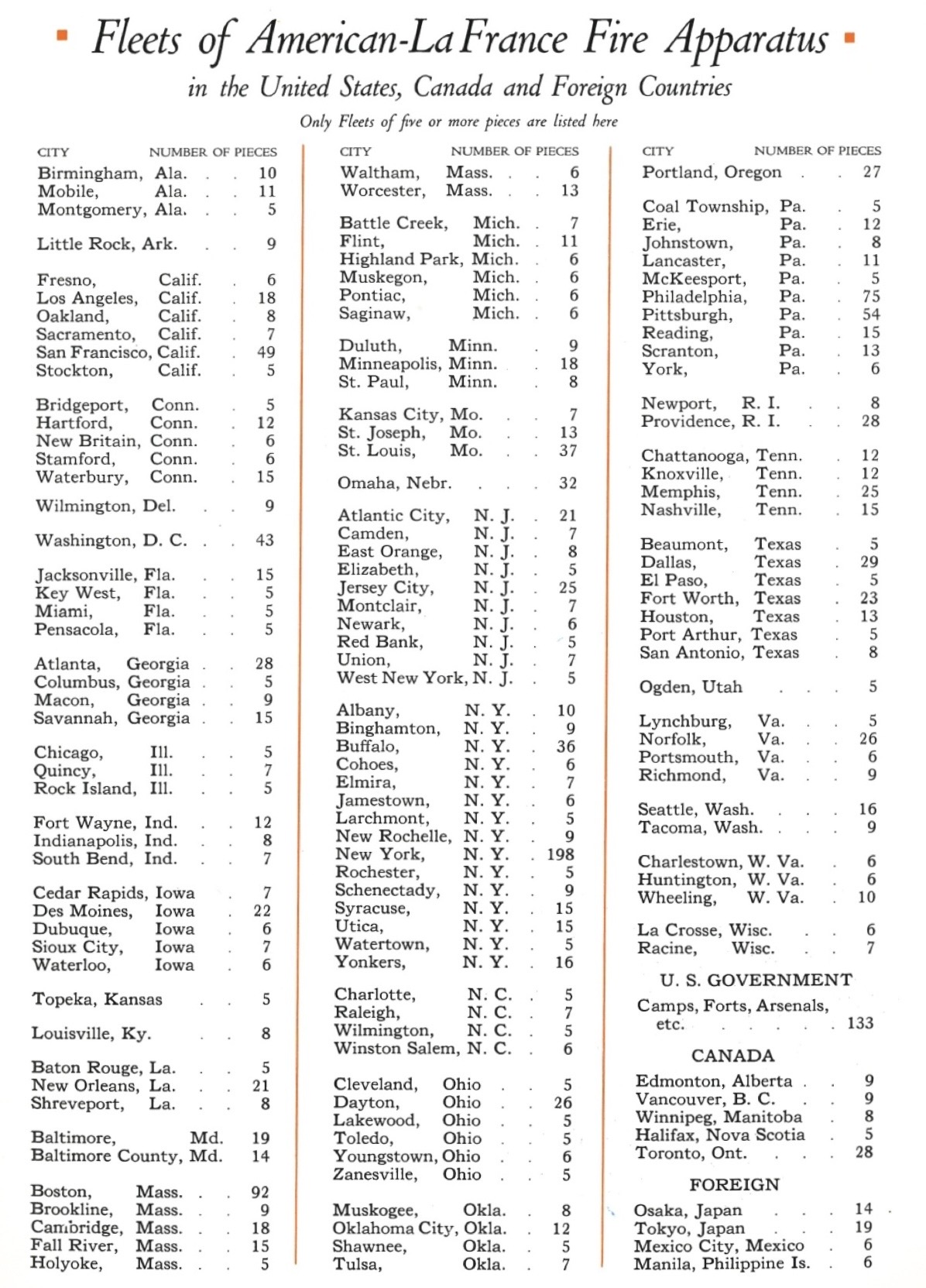
List of well-known American la France vehicles and their whereabouts up to 1923. The list only includes fleets with more than five vehicles. The total number of vehicles listed is 2,128

American LaFrance (ALF) was an American vehicle manufacturer in operation between 1873 and 2014 which focused primarily on the production of fire engines, ladder trucks, and emergency apparatus such as ambulance and rescue vehicles. Originally located in Elmira, New York, the final iteration of the company was located in Summerville, South Carolina. It also operated a plant in Toronto, Ontario, Canada, where it sold apparatus under the name LaFrance-Foamite, until 1971.

Ward LaFrance, an unrelated competitor fire-apparatus manufacturer also based in Elmira Heights, New York, was founded by a LaFrance family member. It went bankrupt in July 1979 and was later reopened by a different party, under the name Ward '79. There is no association.

== History ==
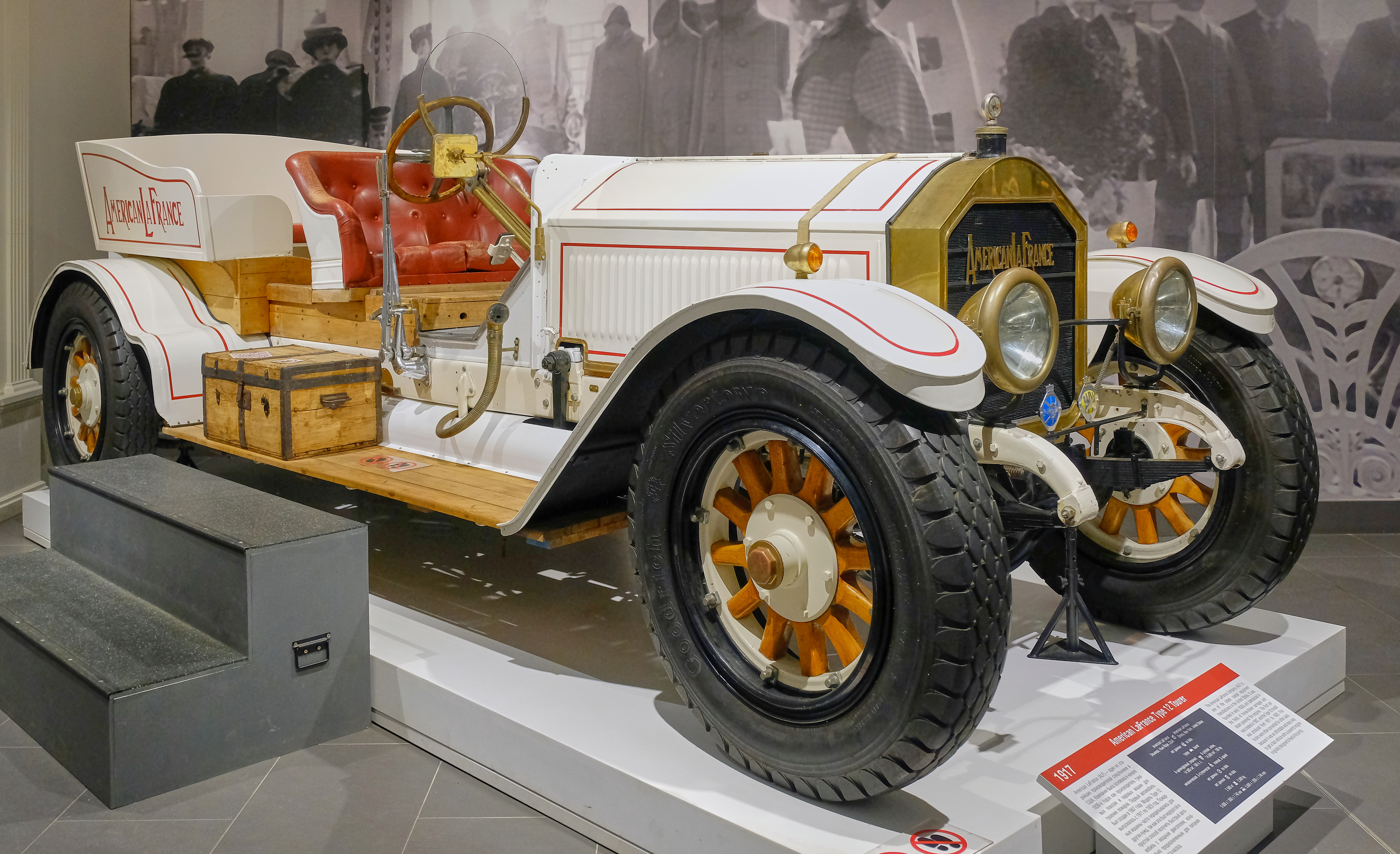
American LaFrance Type 12 Tourer, 1917

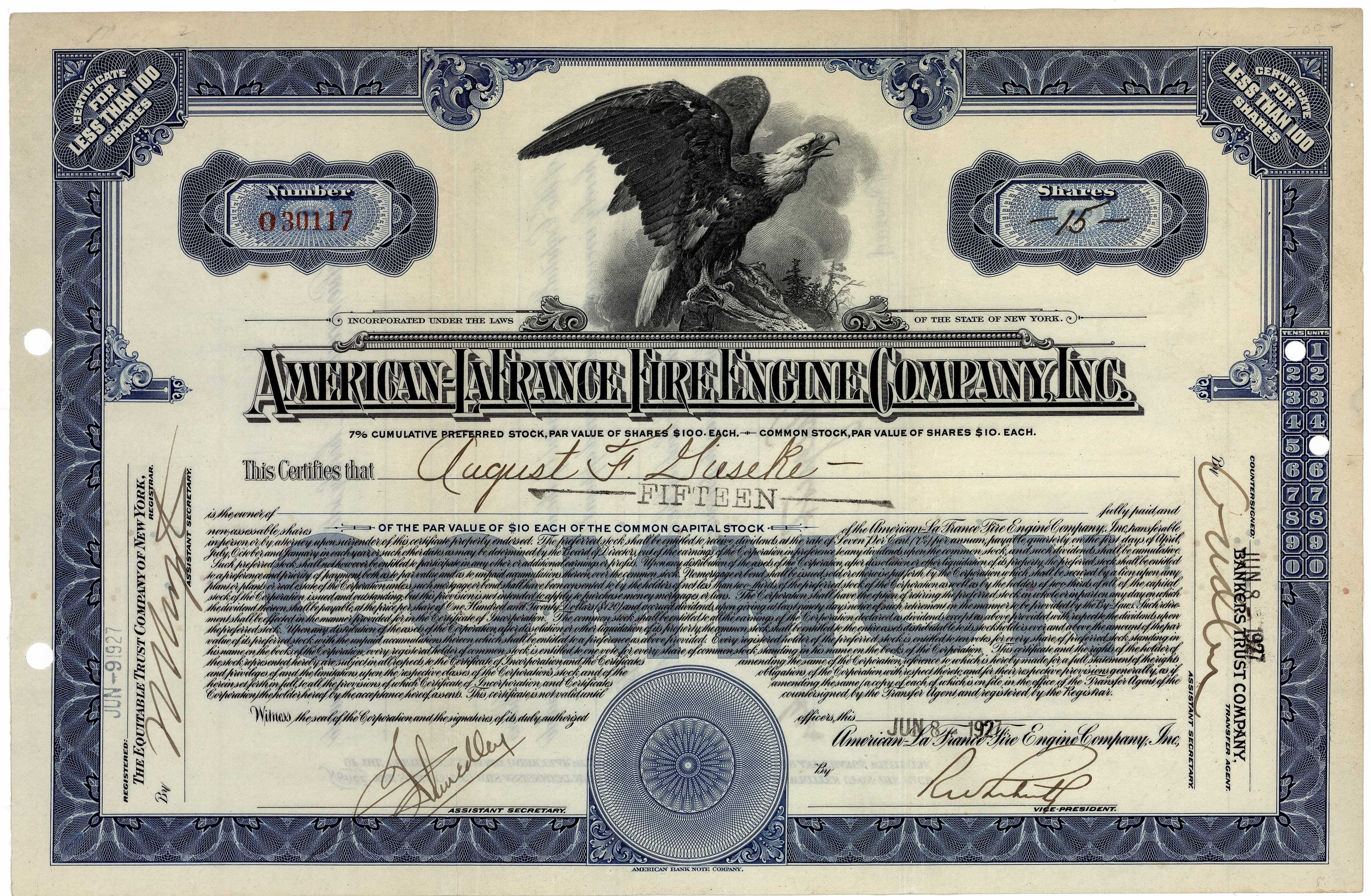
Share of the American-LaFrance Fire Engine Company, issued 8. June 1927

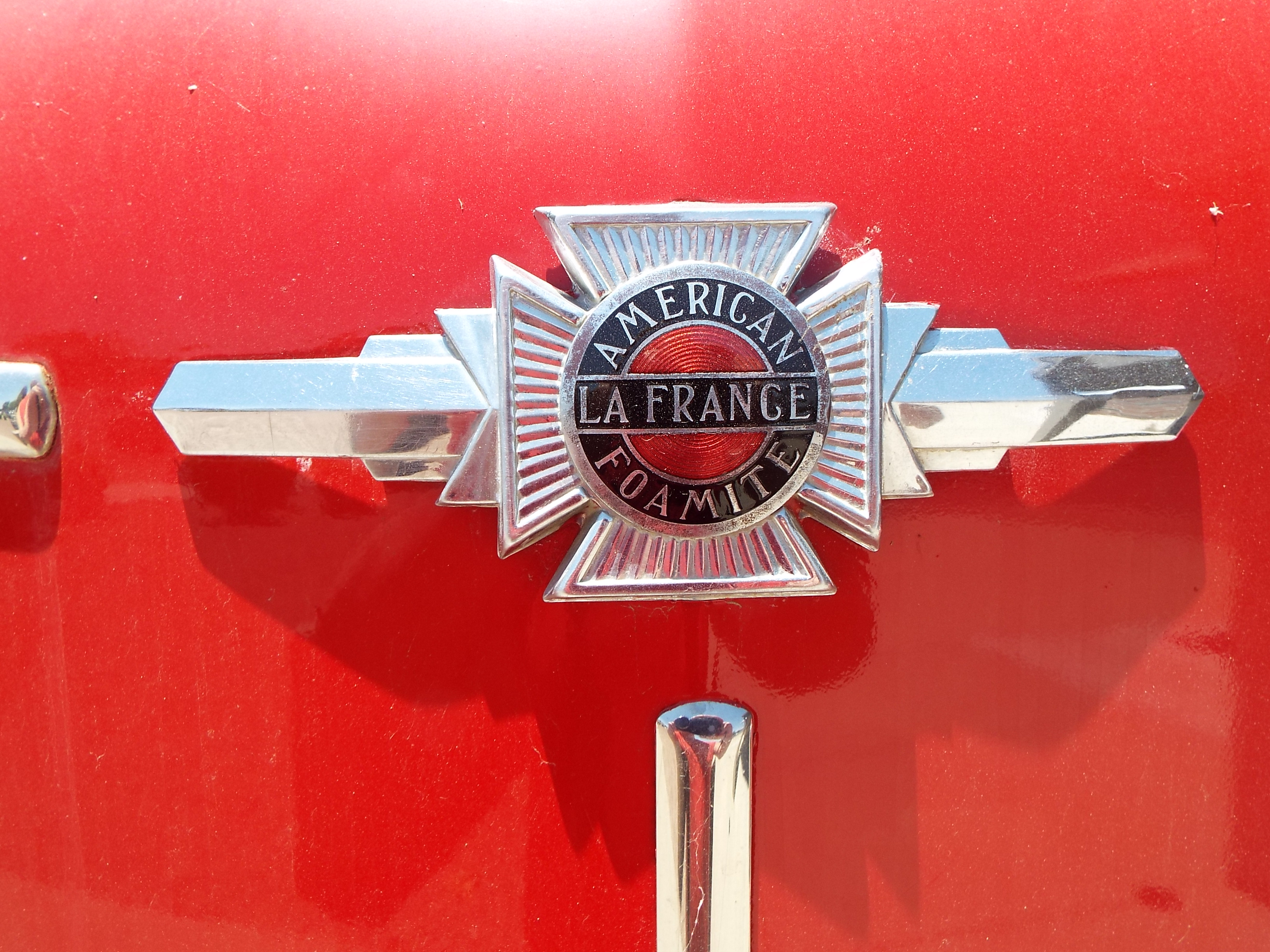
Emblem of the historic 1954 American La France-Foamite 700 Series (California Historical Vehicle 622S)

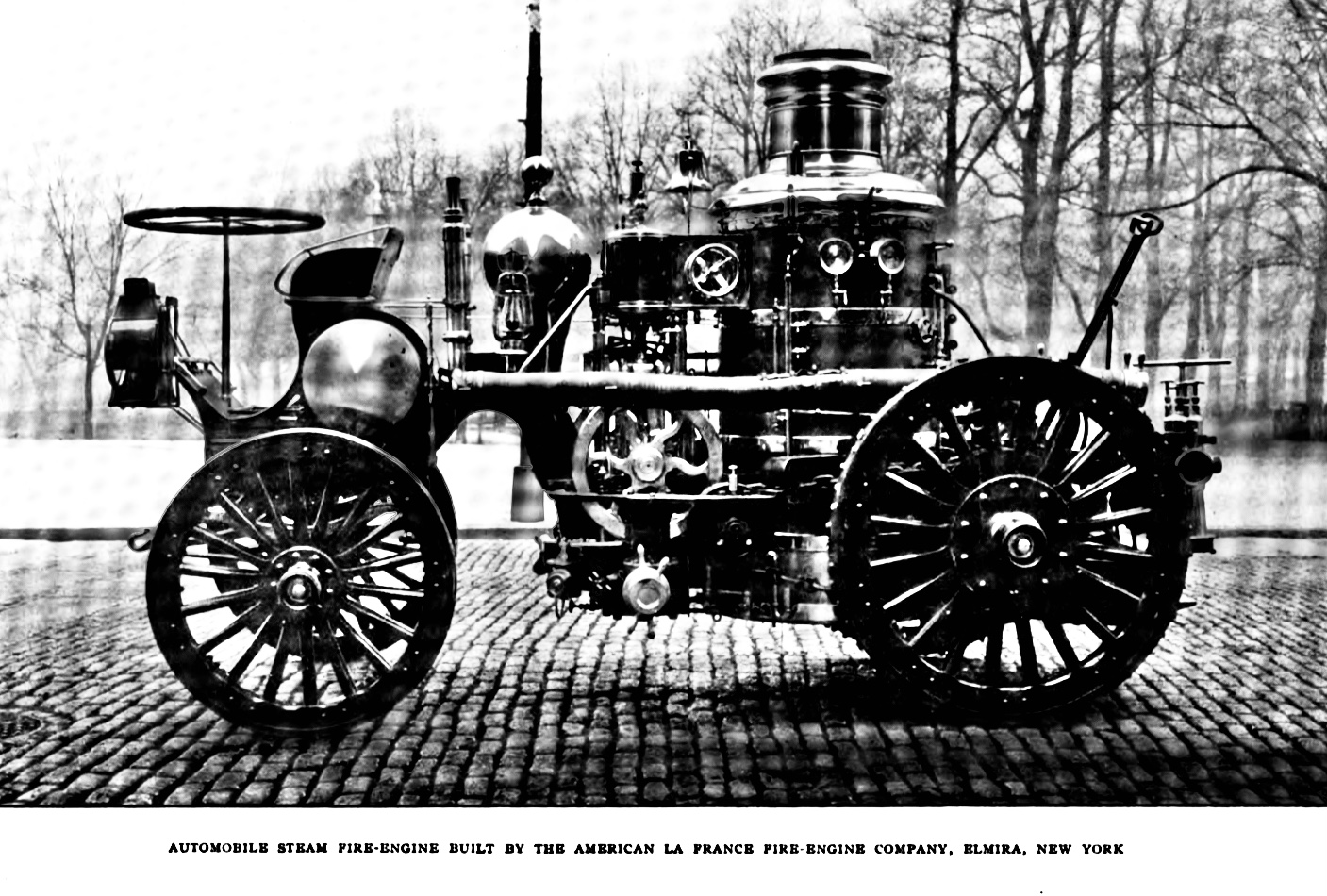
American LaFrance Type 1 (1903)

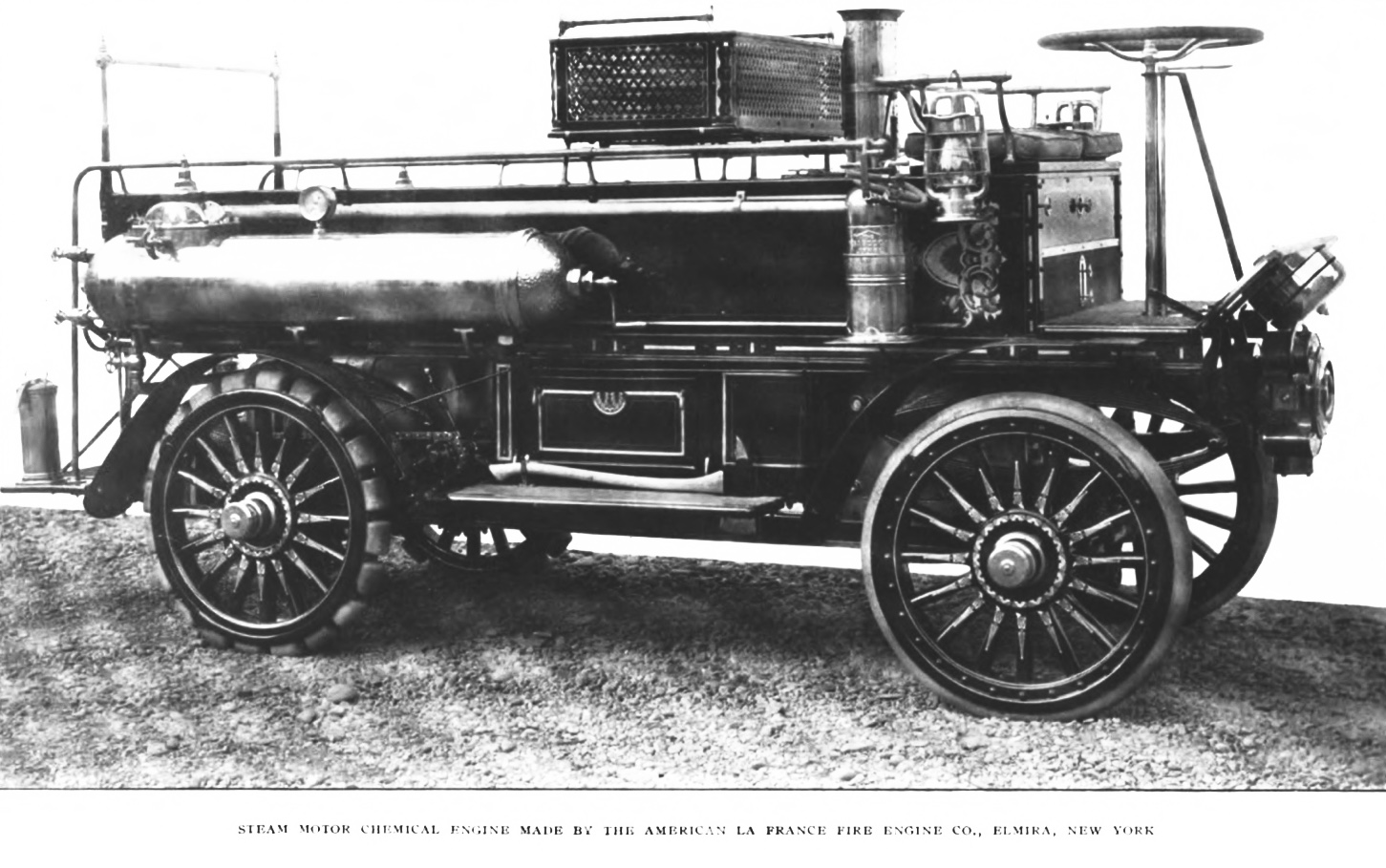
American LaFrance Type 3 (1903)

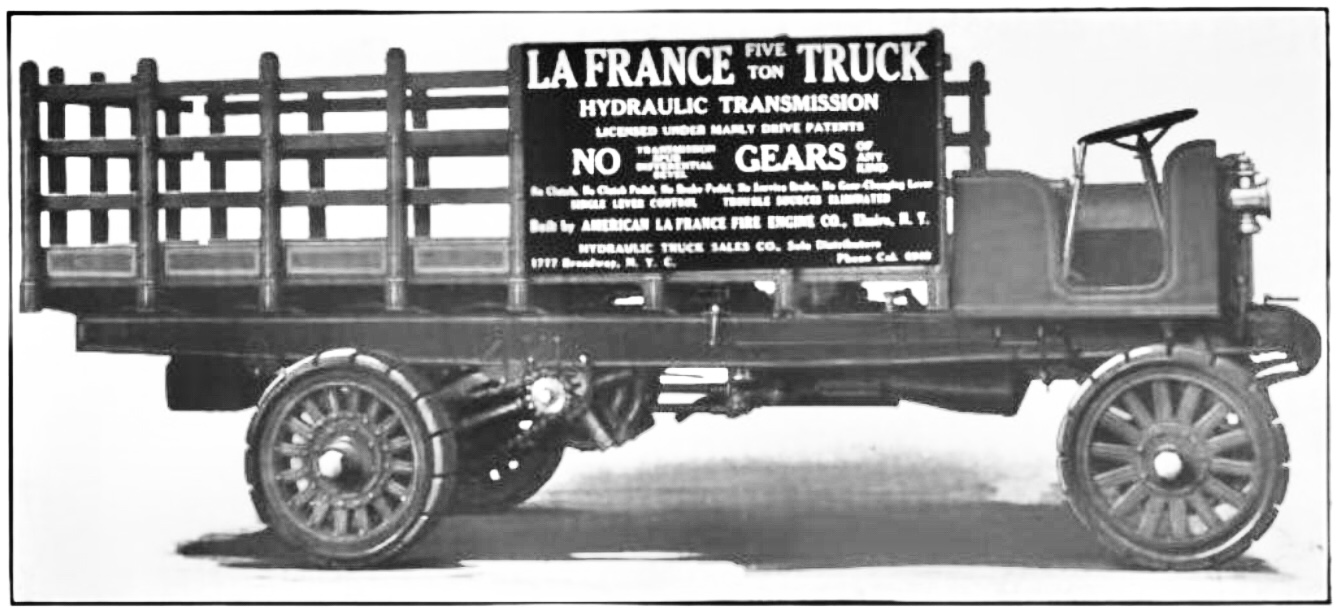
American LaFrance Type 6 (1910-1914)

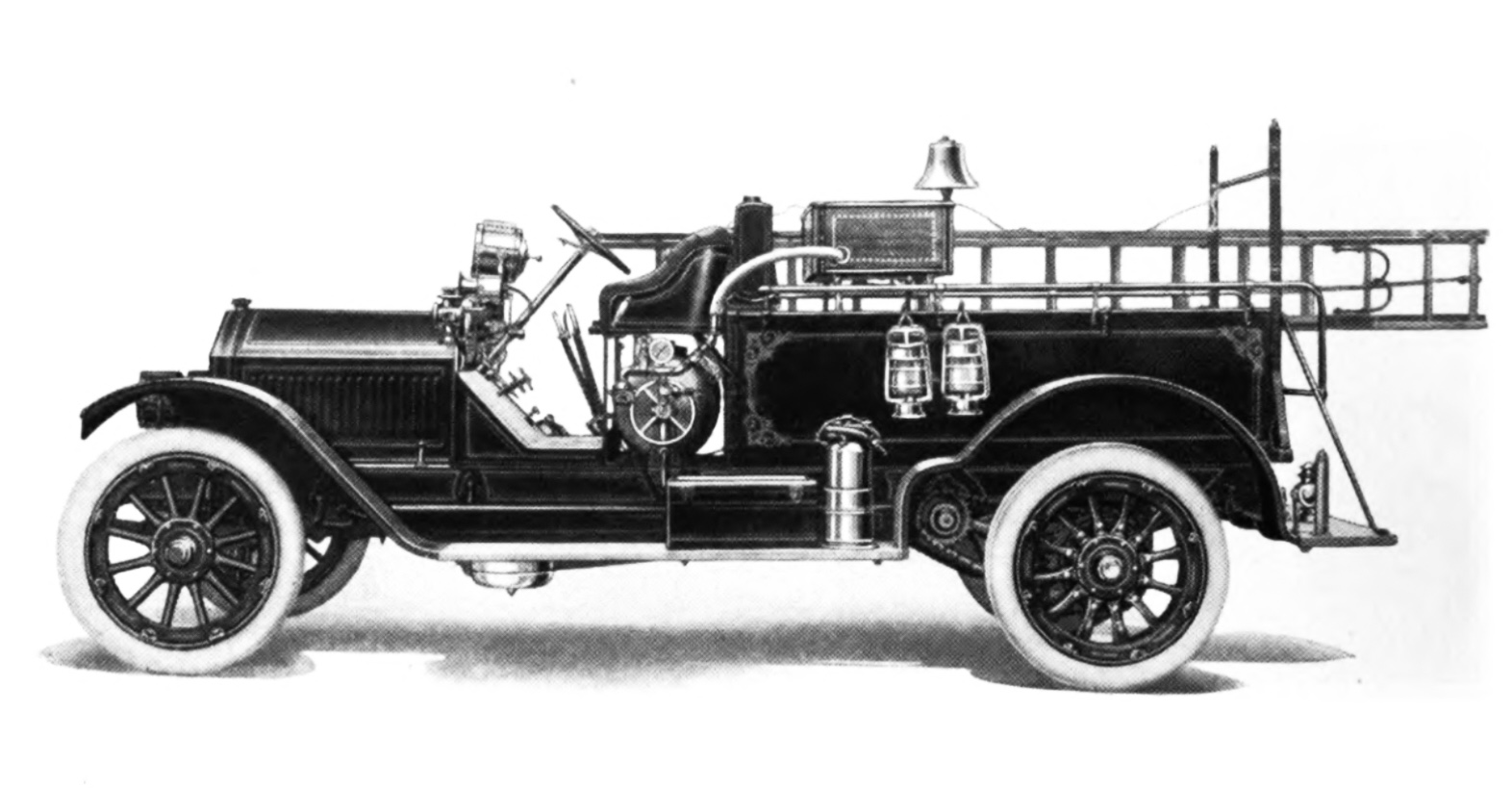
American LaFrance Type 10 (1914)

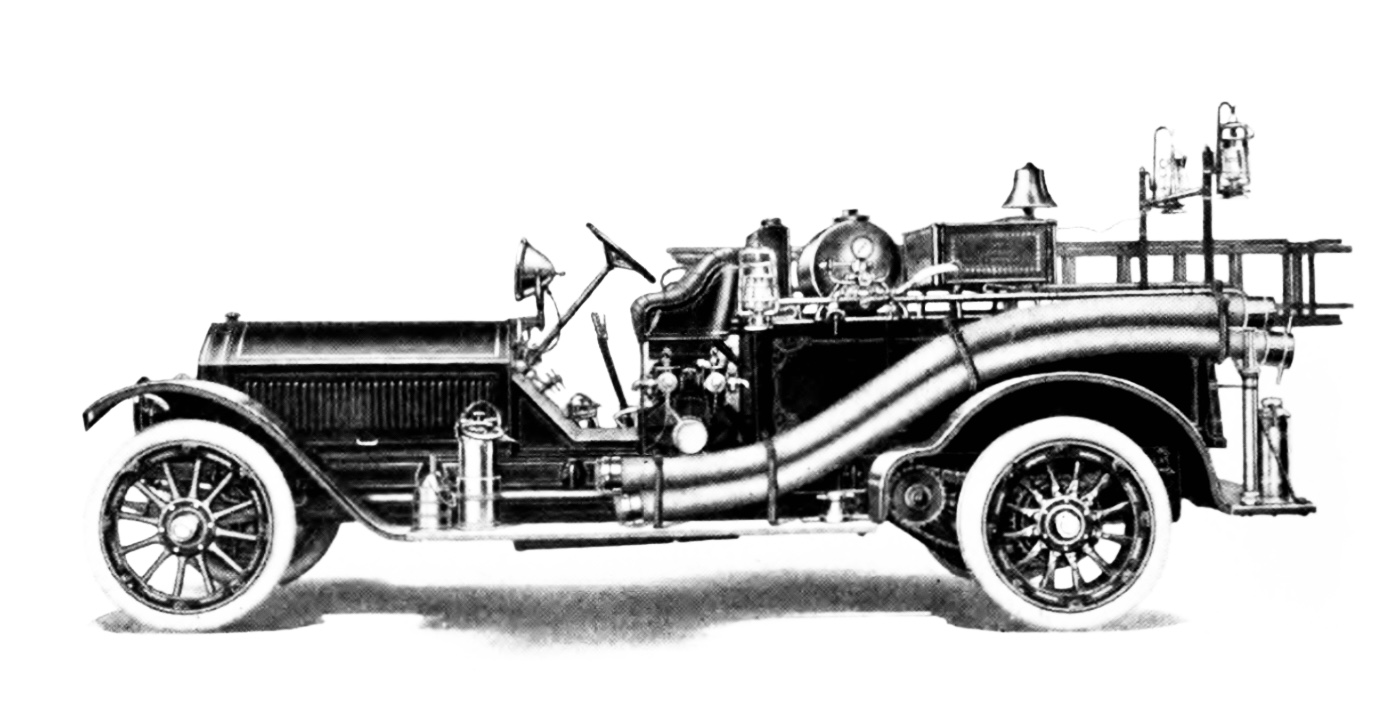
American LaFrance Type 12 (1914)

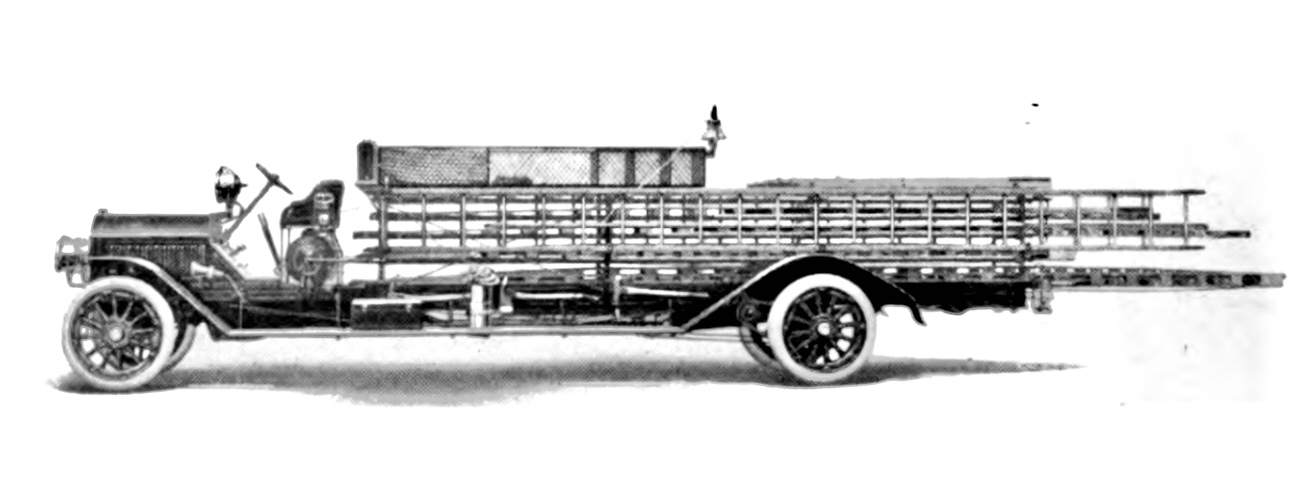
American LaFrance Type 14 (1914)

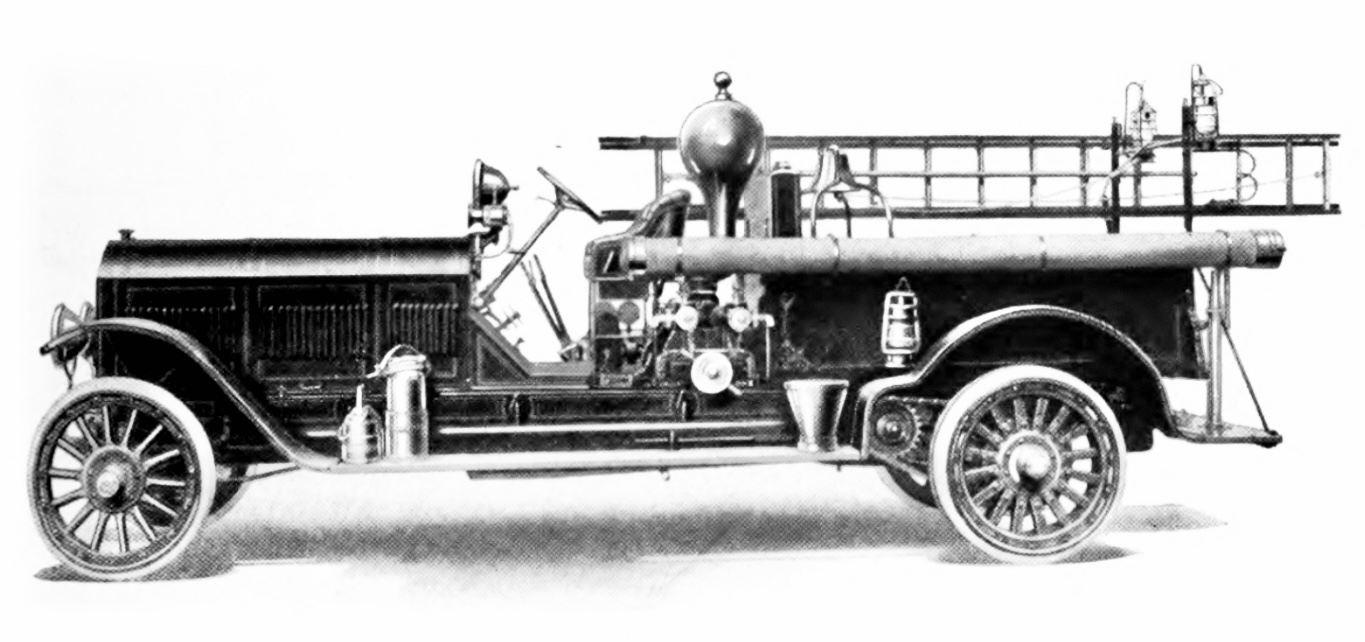
American LaFrance Type 15 (1914)

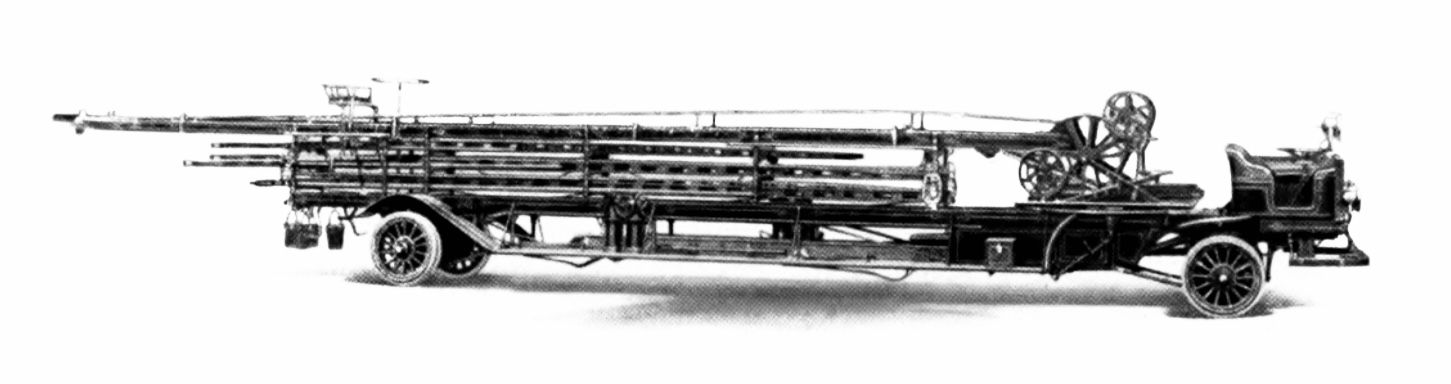
American LaFrance Type 16 (1914)

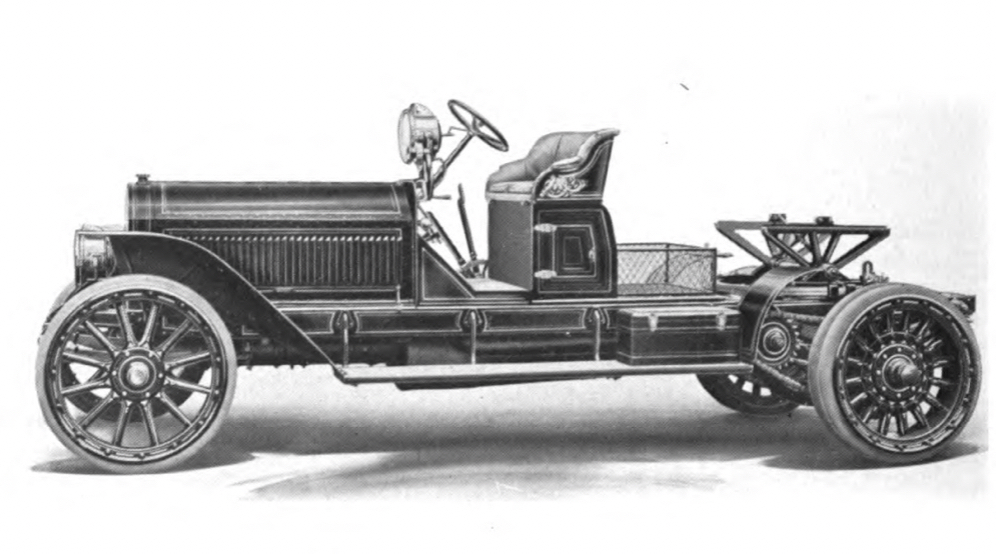
American LaFrance Type 17 (1914)

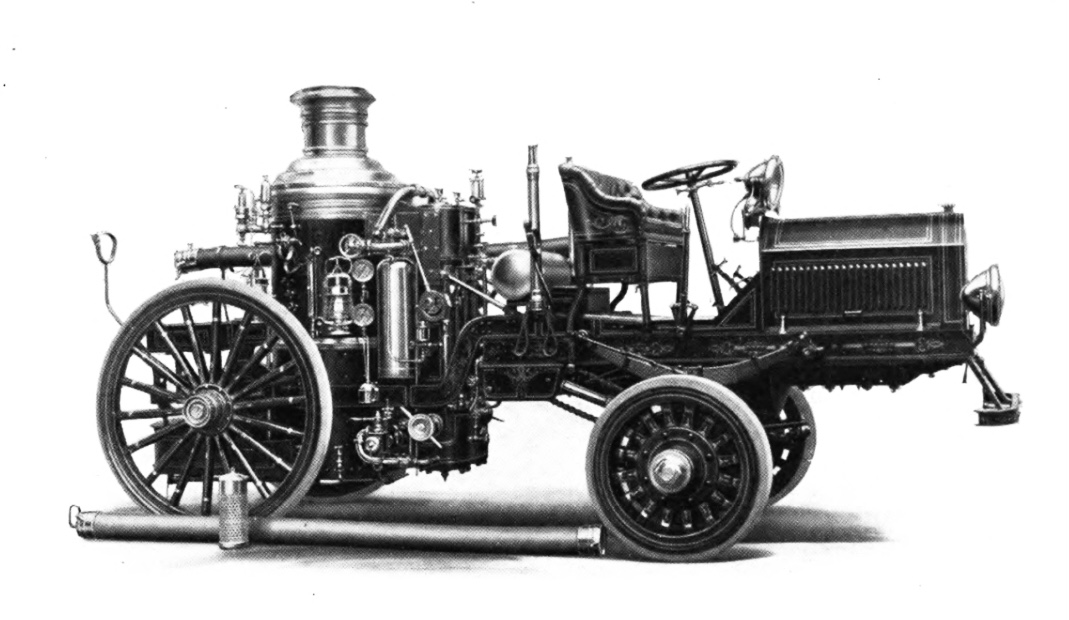
American LaFrance Type 18 (1914)

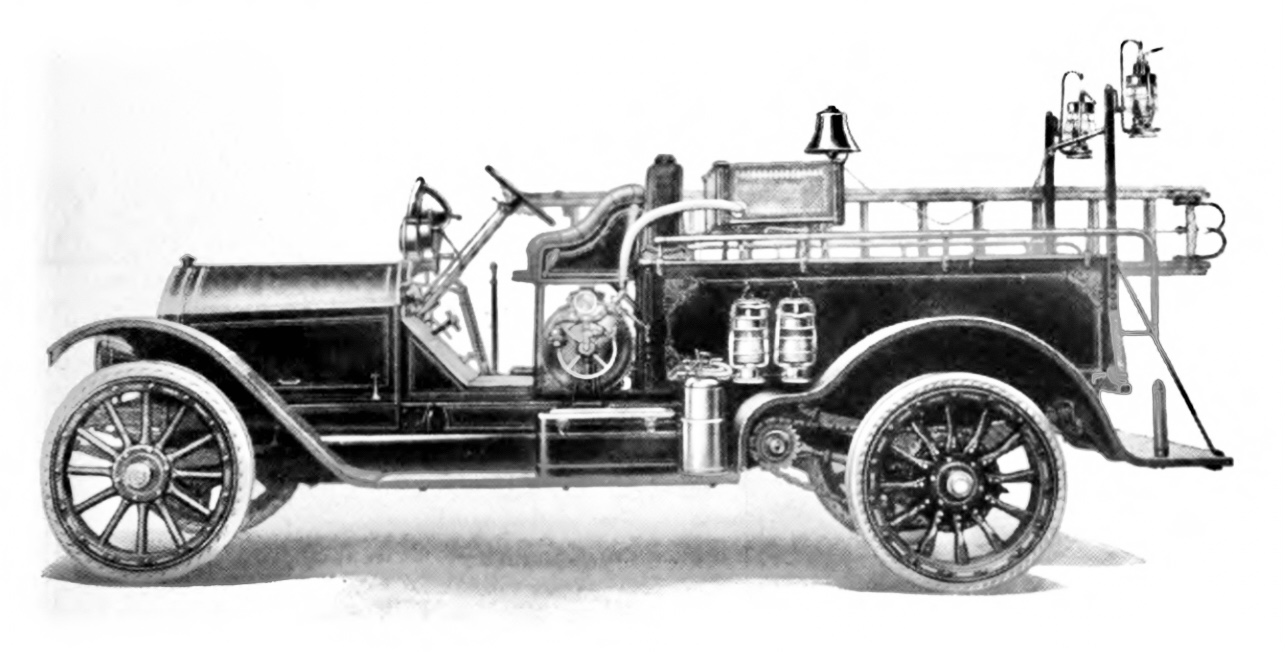
American LaFrance Type 20 (1914)

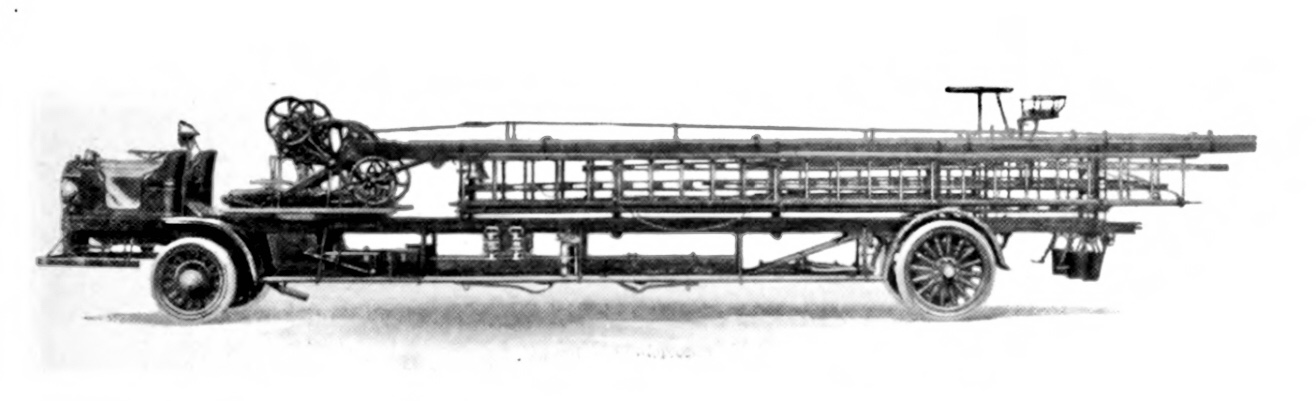
American LaFrance Type 25 (1914)

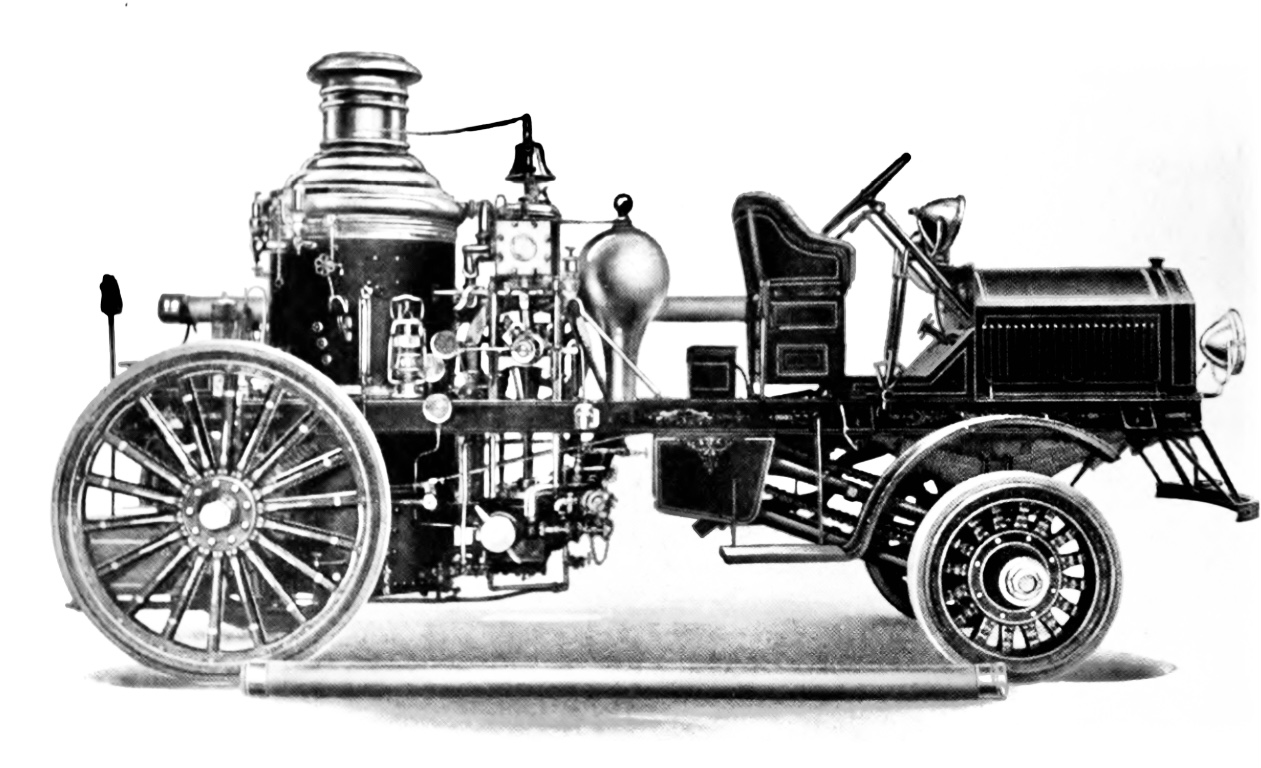
American LaFrance Type 29 (1914)

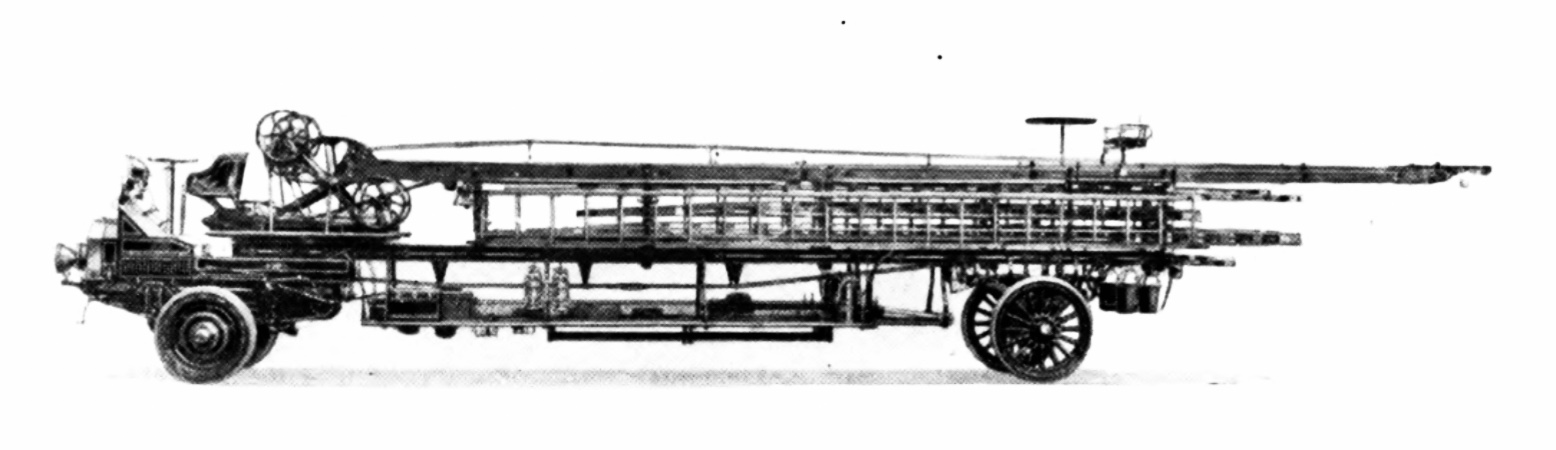
American LaFrance Type 31 (1916)

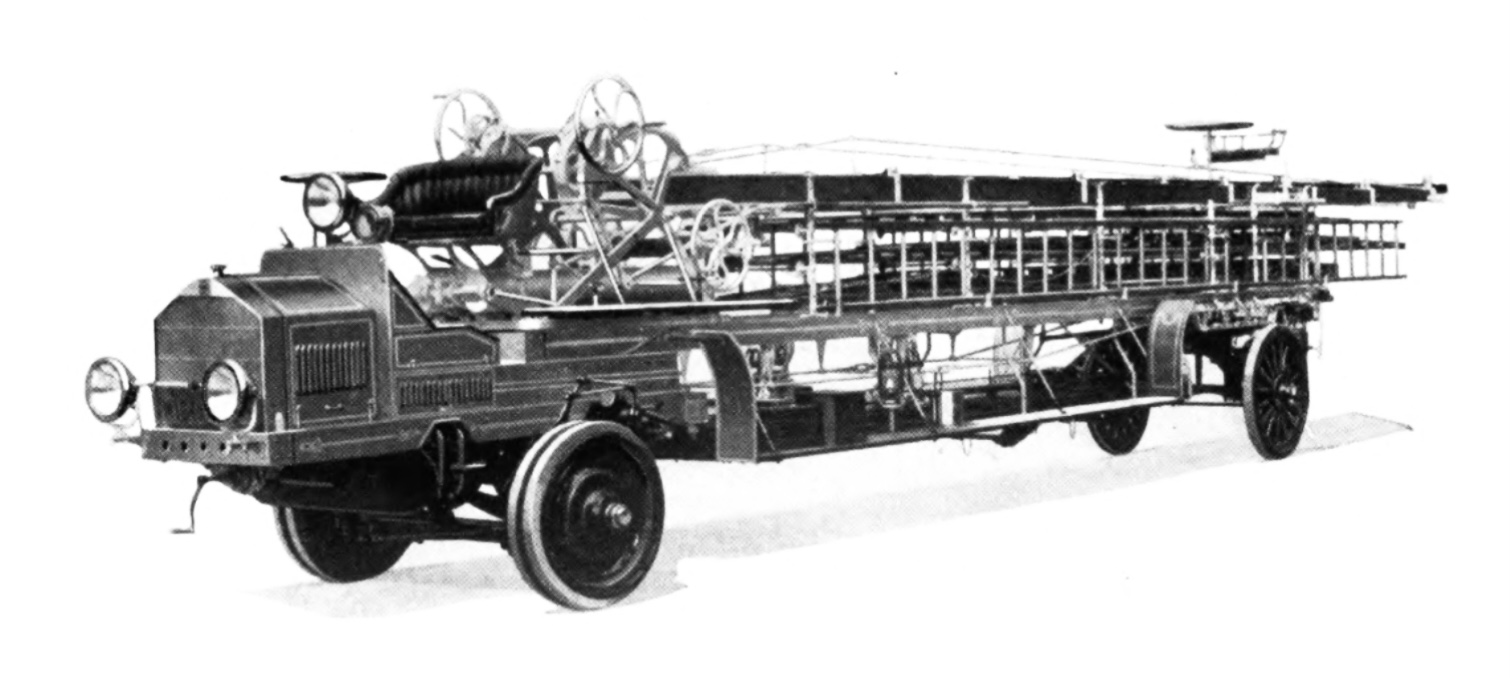
American LaFrance Type 33 (1918)

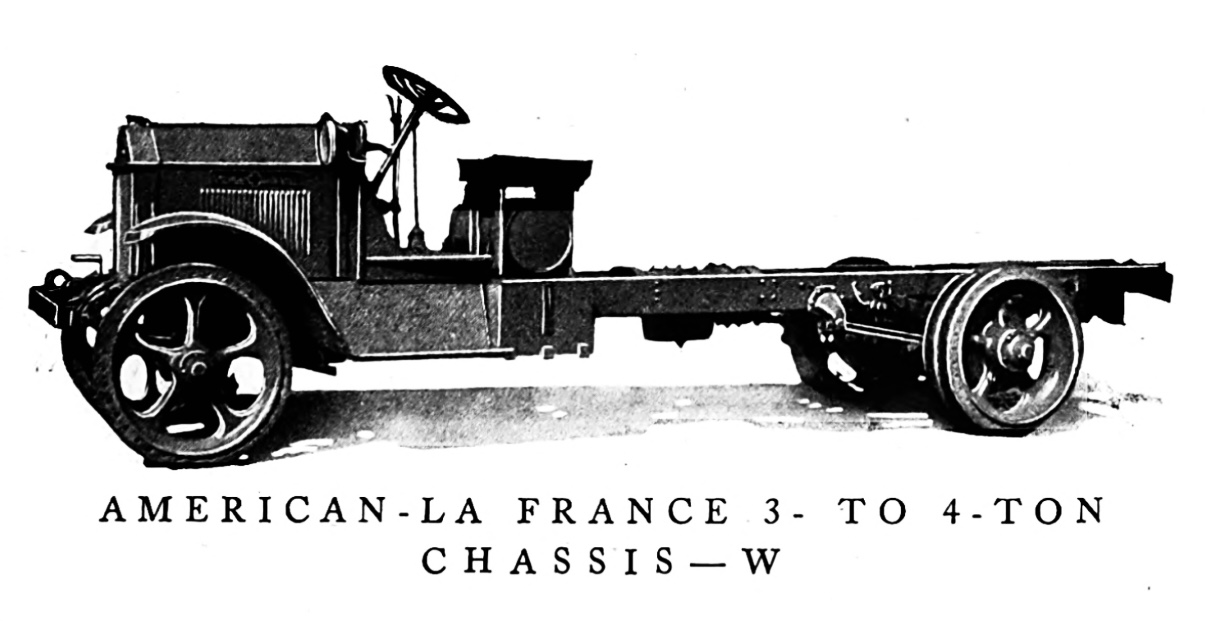
American LaFrance W (1928)

The American LaFrance Fire Engine Company traced its roots to 1832, making it one of the oldest fire apparatus manufacturers in the United States. It was founded in 1873 by Truxton Slocum LaFrance (and partners, including Alexander S. Diven) as the LaFrance Manufacturing Company, selling hand powered equipment. A successor company, the International Fire Engine Company, built some steam power fire engines between 1903 and 1907. Apparatus built by International included horse drawn steamers, hose wagons, and hook & ladders to chemical engines, water towers and combinations. The American LaFrance Fire Engine Company was formed in 1903. ALF delivered its first motorized fire engine in 1907.

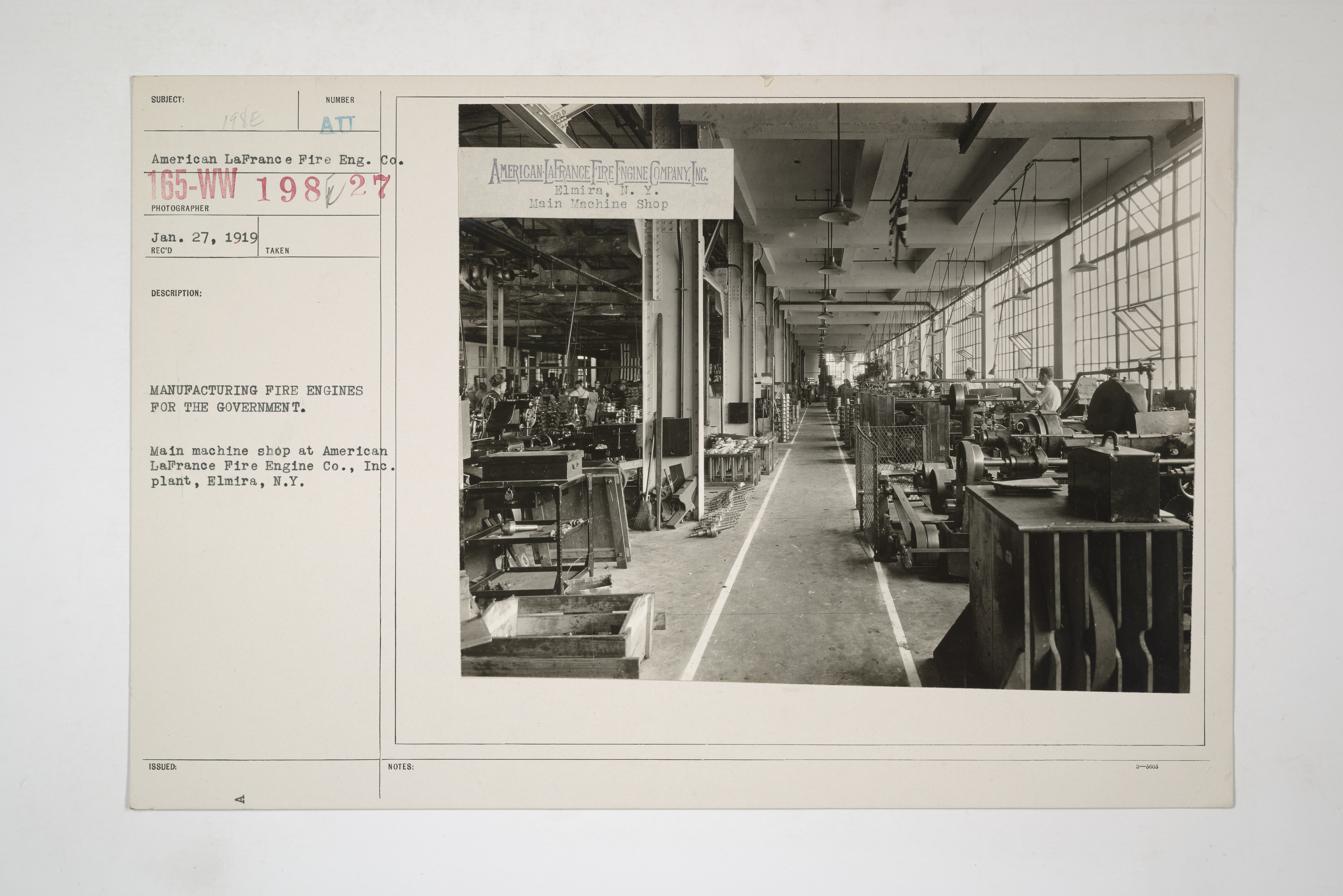
Manufacturing fire engines for the government: main machine shop at American LaFrance Fire Co., Inc., 1919

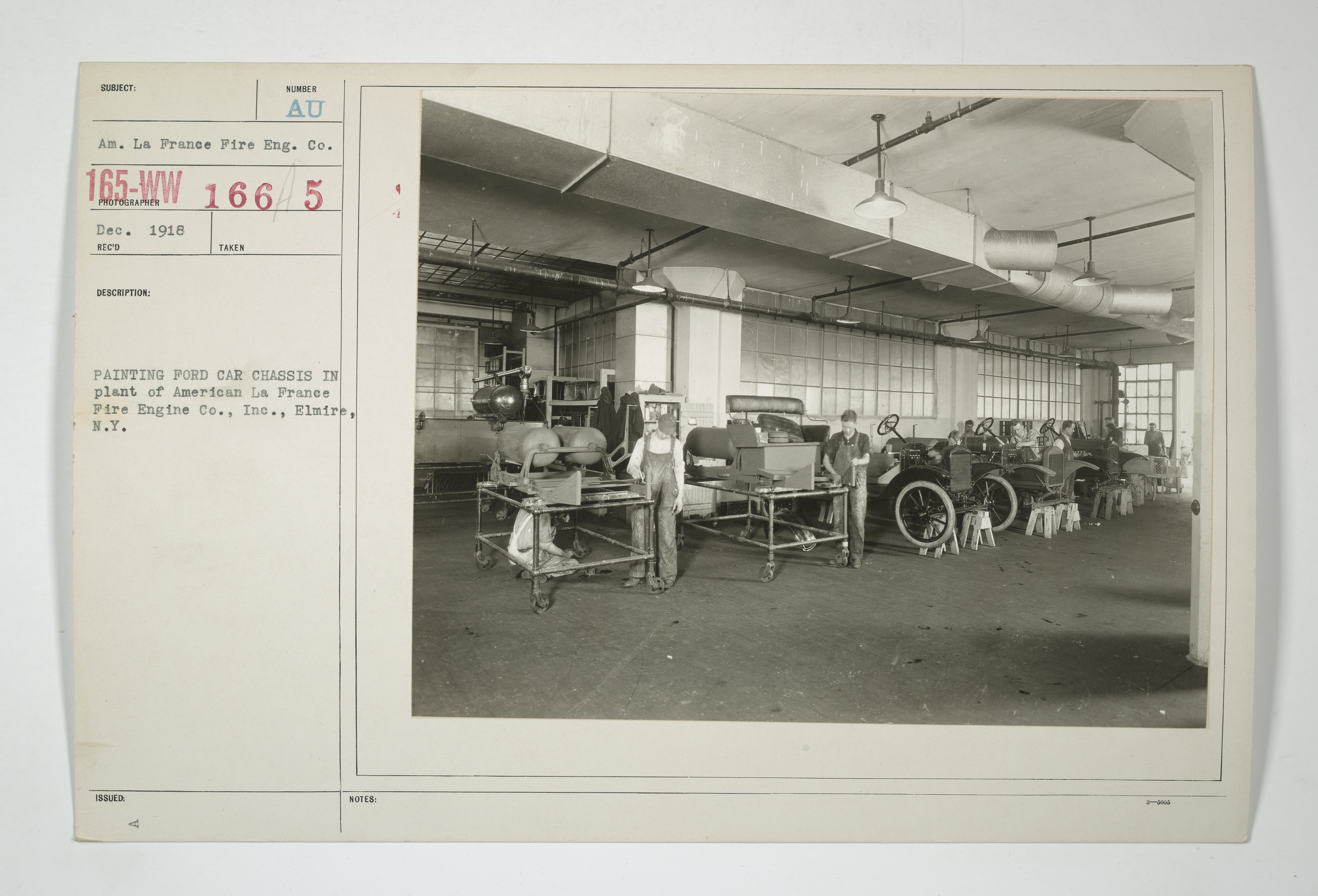
Painting Ford car chassis in plant of American La France Fire Engine Co., Inc. 1918.

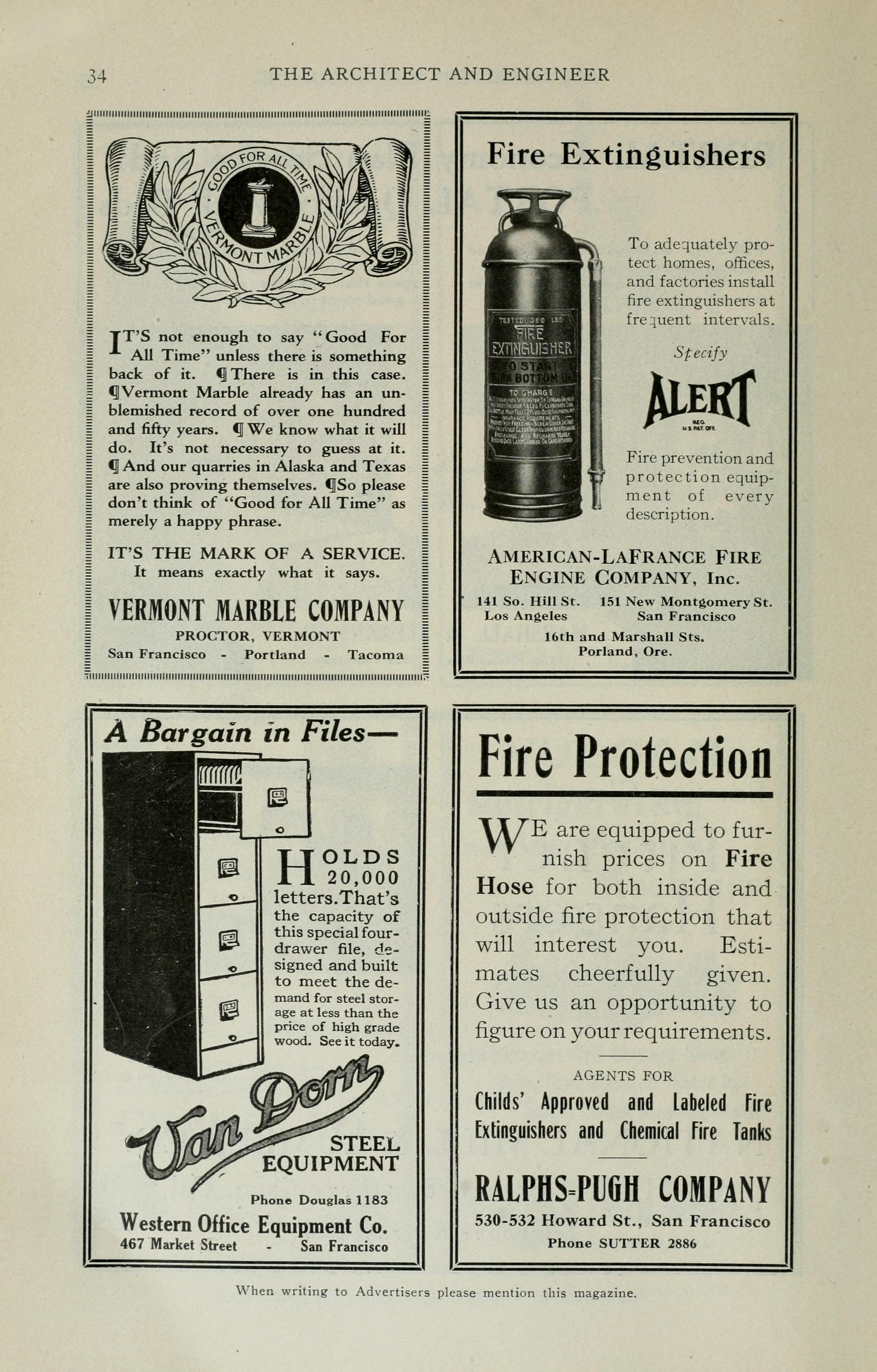
Advertisement for American LaFrance fire extinguisher, c. 1920

According to the Elmira, New York, Star-Gazette:

The company began to manufacture other firefighting equipment and in 1880 became the LaFrance Fire Engine Company. The 1890s was an era of business consolidation with the growth of trusts. A rival firm was created named the American Fire Engine Company. With the idea of creating a monopoly, in 1900 the International Fire Engine Company was announced. It included the American Fire Engine Company, LaFrance Fire Engine Company and Thos. Manning Jr. and Co. Three support equipment manufacturers were included, three fire extinguisher manufacturers also joined the company. In 1903, the company reorganized into the American LaFrance Fire Engine Company and in 1906 company headquarters were relocated from New York City to Elmira.

ALF produced a small run of passenger cars from about 1910 to 1920, totaling around 22 (with several additional "speedsters"). Because the design was based on a Crane-Simplex chassis, several early ALF fire trucks have been retroactively converted into speedsters.

In 1927, ALF acquired the Utica-based O.J. Childs company. The company had created Foamite, a liquid chemical designed to extinguish fires in temperatures ranging from −15 °F to 110 °F.

In 1947, ALF introduced the 700-series fire apparatus. The 700-series was a "cab forward" design, placing the driver ahead of the engine and providing an expansive forward view. This would become the industry standard. In 1959, ALF introduced the 900-series cab-forward chassis. Although it was similar to the 700 (and closely related 800-series), the 900 was an all new design with a wider cab. In addition to the 700-800-900-Series trucks, ALF produced models under the names Century, Pioneer, and Eagle.

The company suspended operations and closed the Elmira operations in 1985. A much-reduced company re-opened for operations in Bluefield, Virginia, in 1986, operating through 1994.

=== Freightliner era ===
In 1995, Freightliner, a subsidiary of Daimler AG, purchased the remnants of the company, yet again resurrecting LaFrance. Freightliner continued to utilize American LaFrance's original nameplates and designations including the Eagle custom chassis. Many of their Liberty products were built on Freightliner M2 or Sterling Acterra chassis. ALF operated additional manufacturing facilities in Ephrata, Pennsylvania; Sanford, Florida; and Hamburg, New York. In 2005 it was the fifth largest manufacturer of emergency vehicles in North America.

=== Patriarch Partners era ===
In December 2005, it was announced that Freightliner had transferred the ownership of American LaFrance to the New York–based investment firm Patriarch Partners, LLC. The headquarters and main plant in Ladson, South Carolina, were not included in the transaction. However, Patriarch Partners was allowed to use the plant until early 2007, when DaimlerChrysler began using the plant for assembly of the Dodge Sprinter. Under new ownership ALF relocated within the Charleston, South Carolina, area in summer 2007 to a brand-new facility, including manufacturing and corporate headquarters, with nearly 500,000 square feet (46,000 m^{2}) of total space.

On 28 January 2008, American LaFrance filed for Chapter 11 bankruptcy protection, blaming problems with implementation of a new IBM enterprise resource planning (ERP) system. On 25 July 2008, the company emerged from bankruptcy with a revised business plan to transfer the firetruck body building portion of the business to the remaining Hamburg, New York (formerly RDMurray Inc.), and Ephrata, Pennsylvania (formerly Ladder Towers Inc.), facilities. The Summerville, South Carolina, plant continued to manufacture fire truck cab and chassis, but focused on vocational vehicles and the Condor vehicle line. In 2009, the company closed Hamburg and Ephrata, attempting to consolidate operations to Summerville. On 17 January 2014, the company announced it would cease operation. Remaining assets of the company, which included parts and partially completed trucks, were auctioned to pay creditors. As of that October it was highly unlikely American LaFrance would be opening its doors ever again.

=== Historical collections ===
The North Charleston Fire Museum and Educational Center, located in North Charleston, South Carolina, claims to house "the largest collection of professionally restored American LaFrance fire apparatus in the country". The museum has an active collection of 20 ALF vehicles, each in operating condition.

The North Charleston Fire Museum and Education Center is expected to close February 14th, 2026 after collectors reclaim loaned equipment for sale.

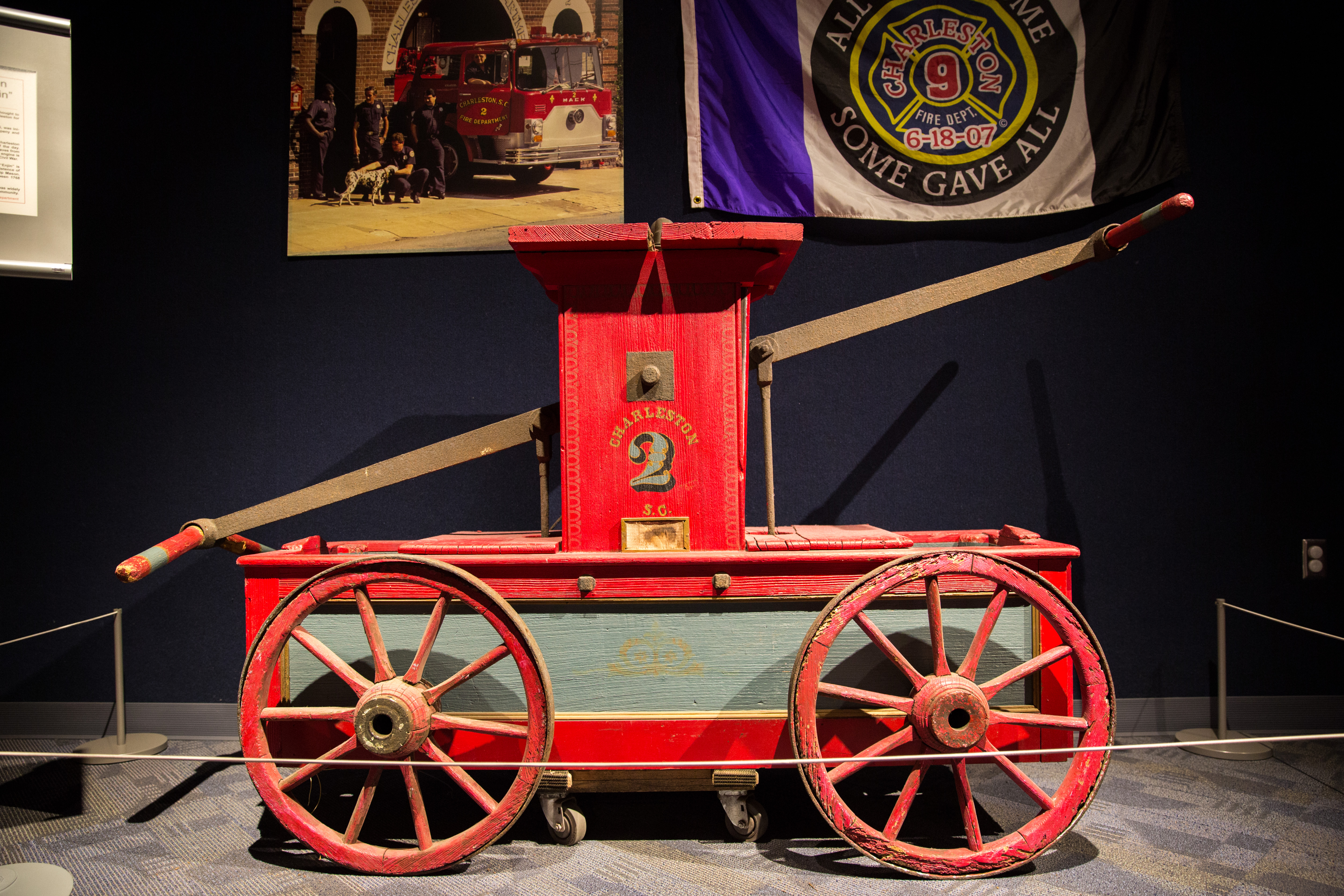

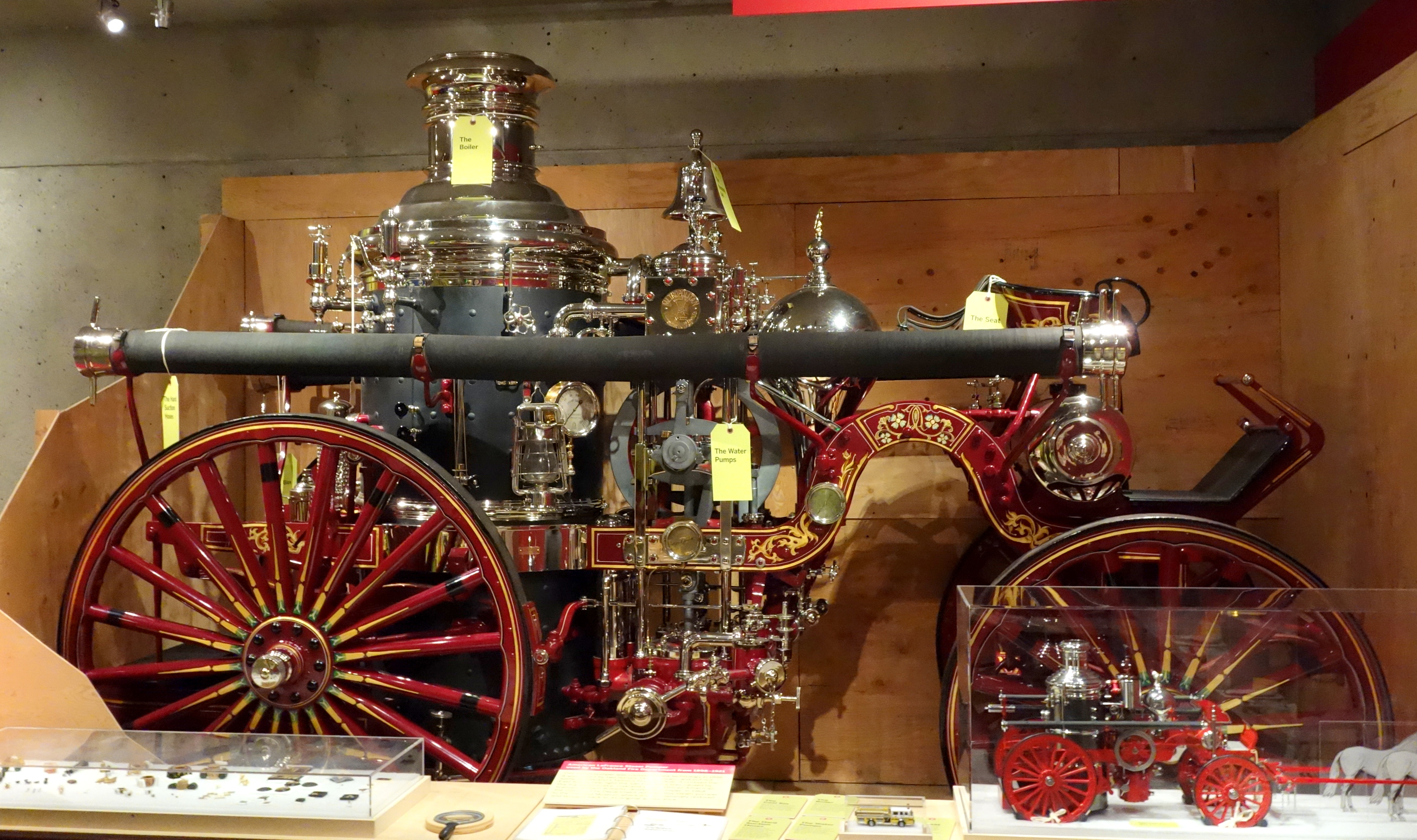
American LaFrance Steam Pumper, used by Oakland Fire Department

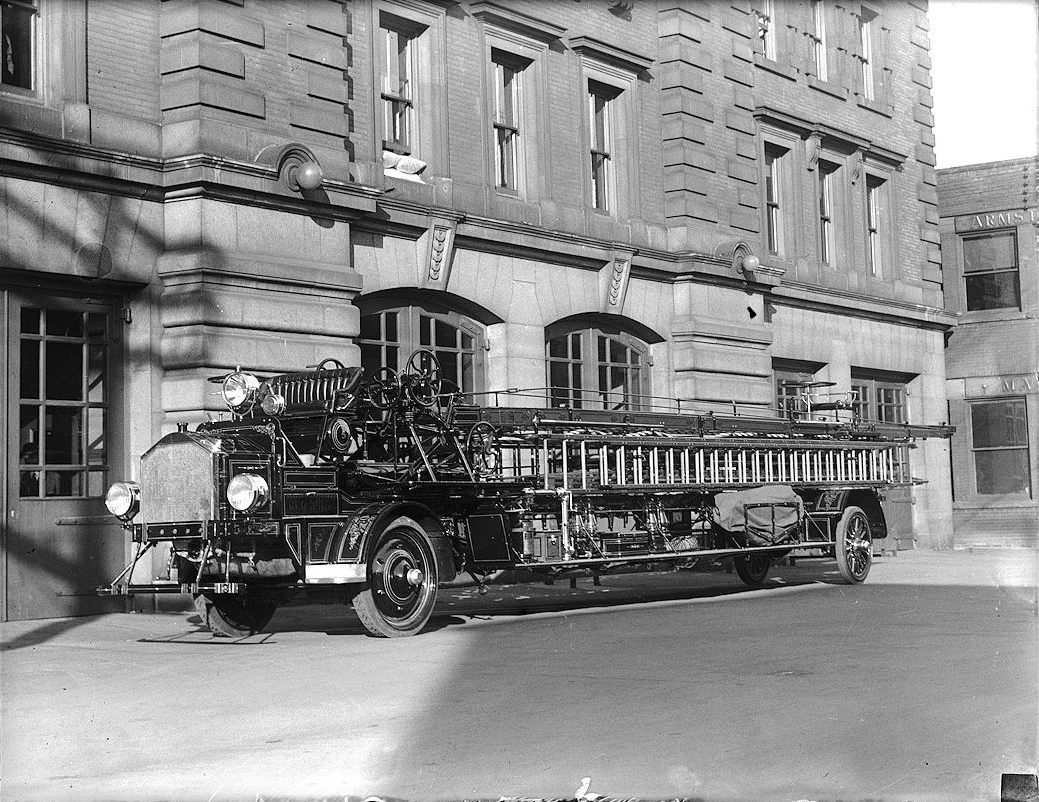
Aerial American LaFrance, Adelaide Street Firehall c. 1934

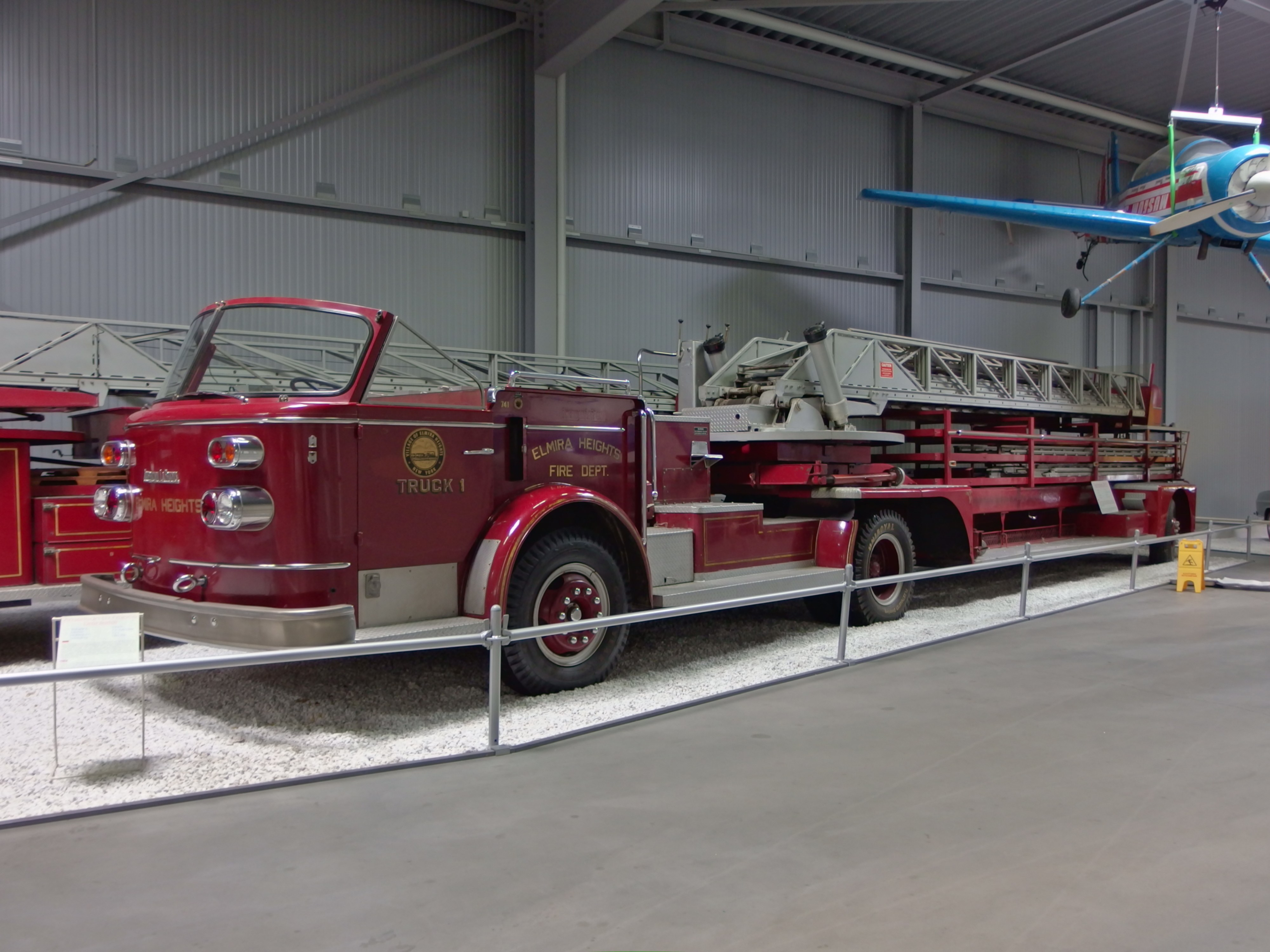
American LaFrance 700/800/900-Series

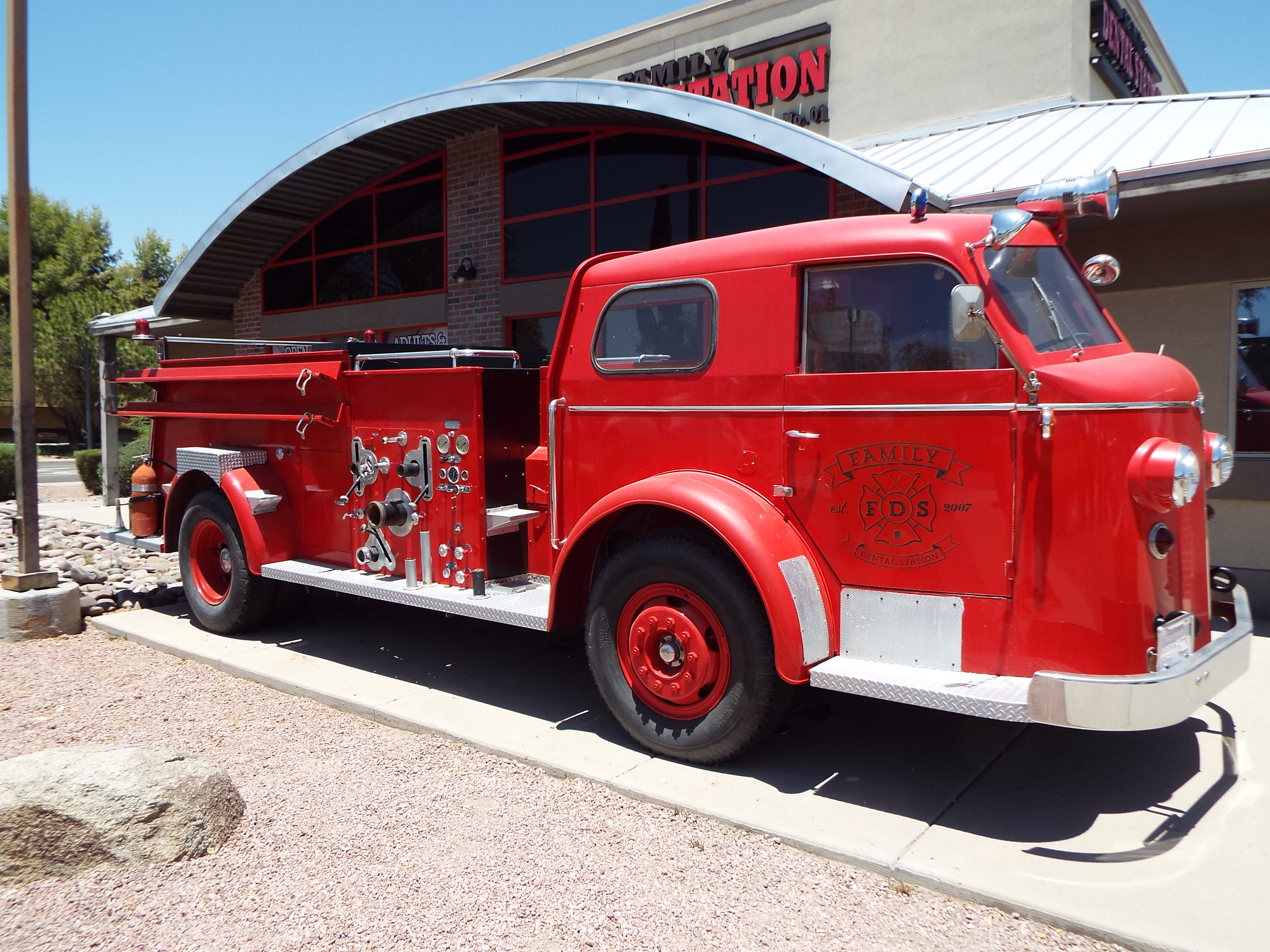
American LaFrance 700/800/900-Series

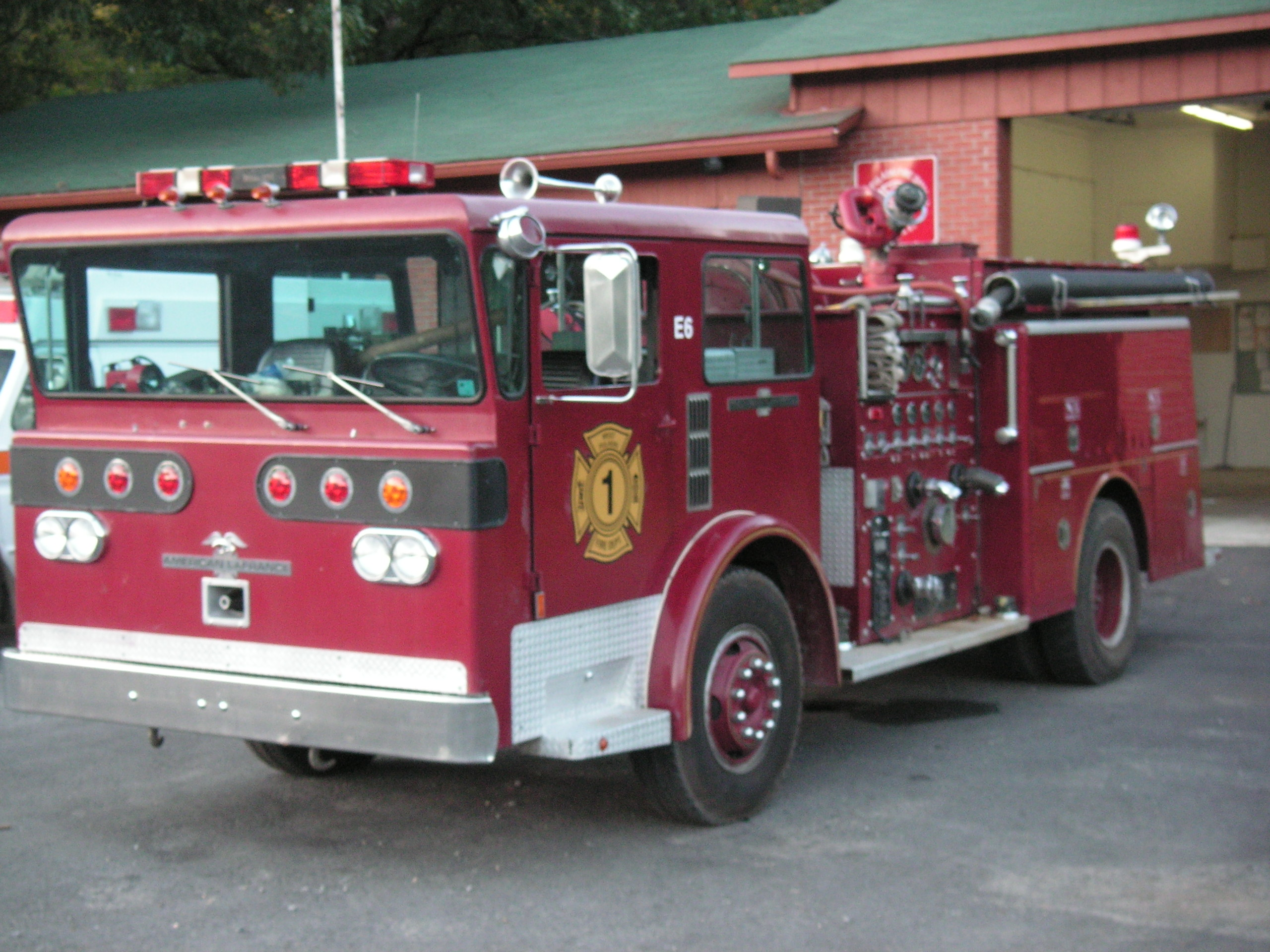
Pioneer Series

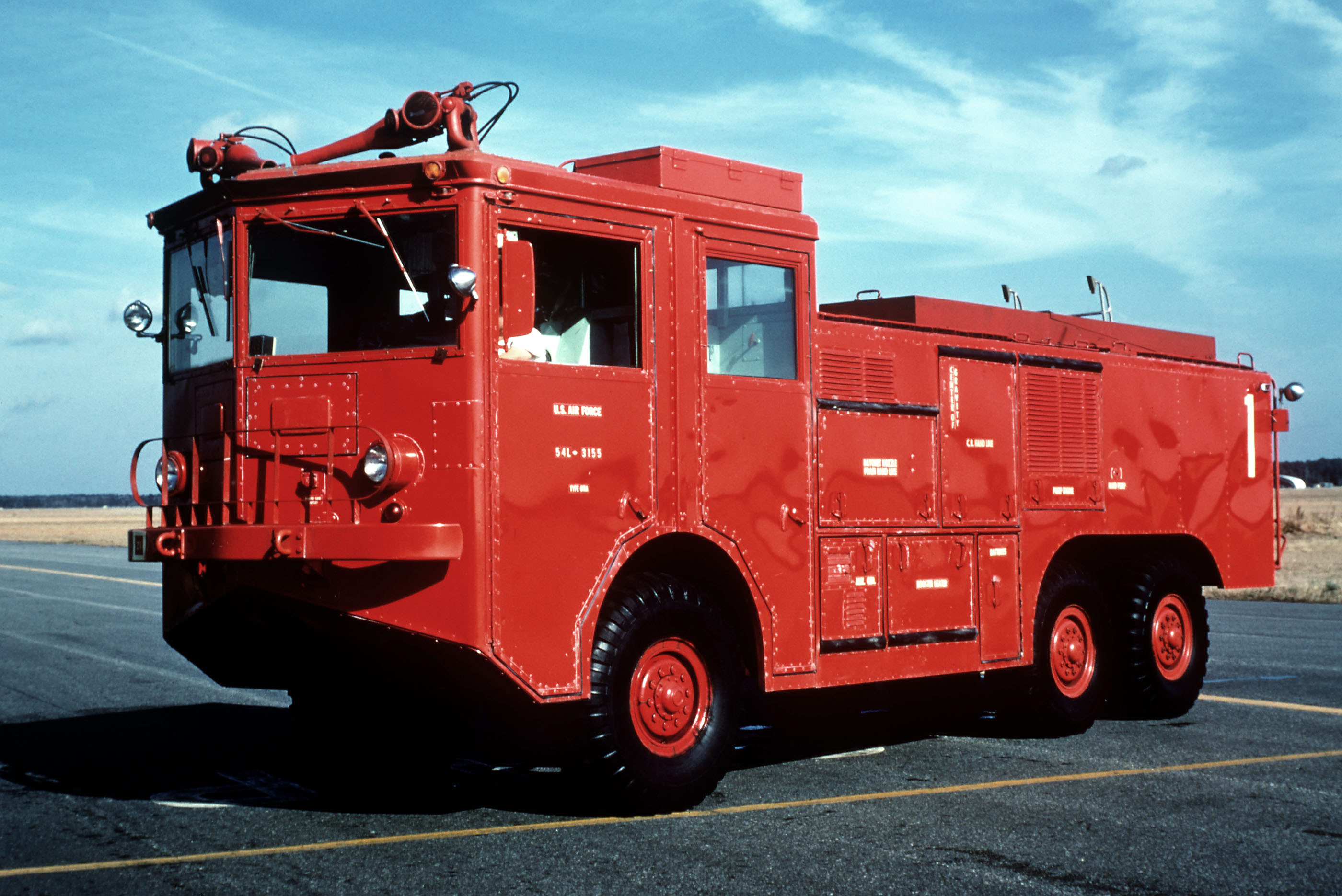
O-11A airport crash tender

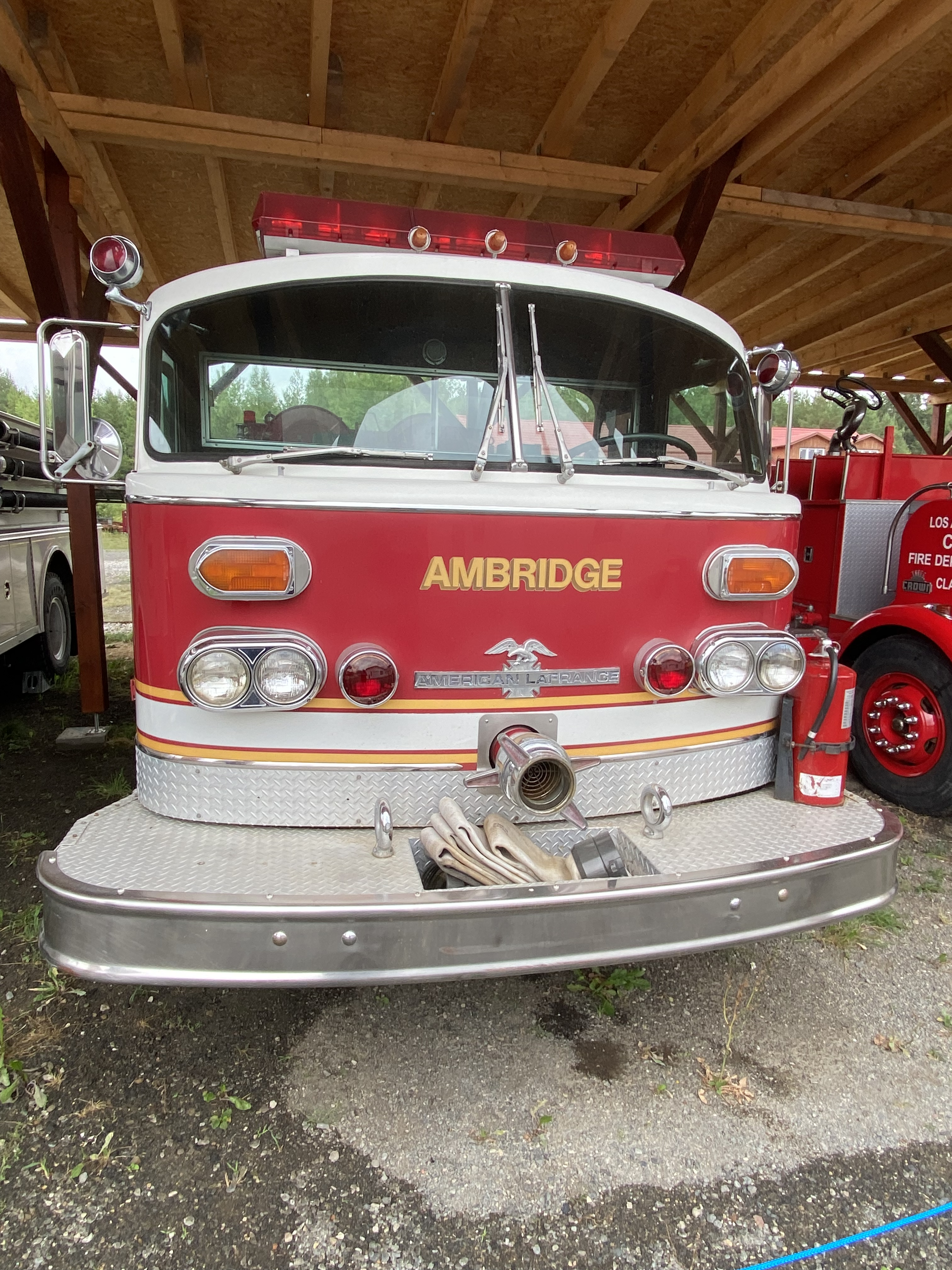
1977 American LaFrance FT

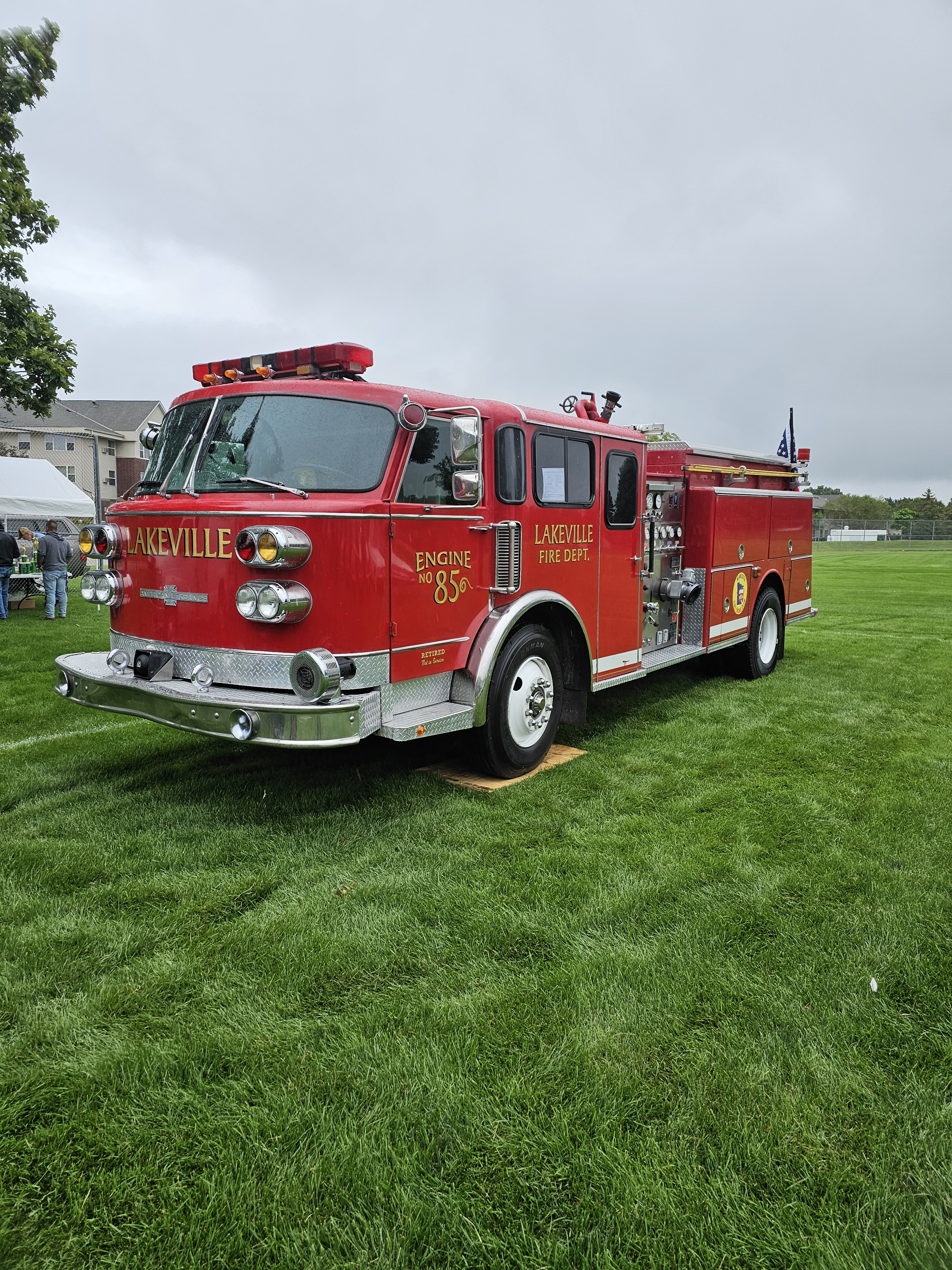
1981 American Lafrance Century

=== World record ===
A 1921 American LaFrance Type 12 engine serial #3970 was the first motorized fire truck in Anchorage, Alaska. On November 23, 1922, a fire started in the Evans-Jonesville Coal Mine, in Sutton, AK. The mine was accessible by railroad and the primary source of coal for electricity and heating for Anchorage. The fire truck was loaded onto a rail car and, along with the Fire Chief and a firefighter, was taken to the mine. It pumped for 13 days straight, only being shut down for oil changes and to change hose due to broken couplings. This was done in freezing weather.

== See also ==
- Midtown Madness, PC game that featured La France as a two racing vehicles in Mod.
- Midtown Madness 2, PC game that featured La France as a first racing vehicle and second racing vehicle in MM2 Revisited
- Ward LaFrance Truck Corporation
- Brutus (car), aero engined car based on a La France chassis.
