= MacVeagh =

MacVeagh is a surname, and refers to four different persons, all of the same family:

- Charles MacVeagh (1860–1931), American diplomat; son of Wayne
- Franklin MacVeagh (1837–1934), American banker and U.S. Secretary of the Treasury; brother of Wayne
- Lincoln MacVeagh (1890–1972), American diplomat; son of Charles
- Wayne MacVeagh, (1833–1917), American politician and diplomat; brother of Franklin
