= Benjamin Learned House =

Historic house in New Hampshire, United States

- U.S. National Register of Historic Places
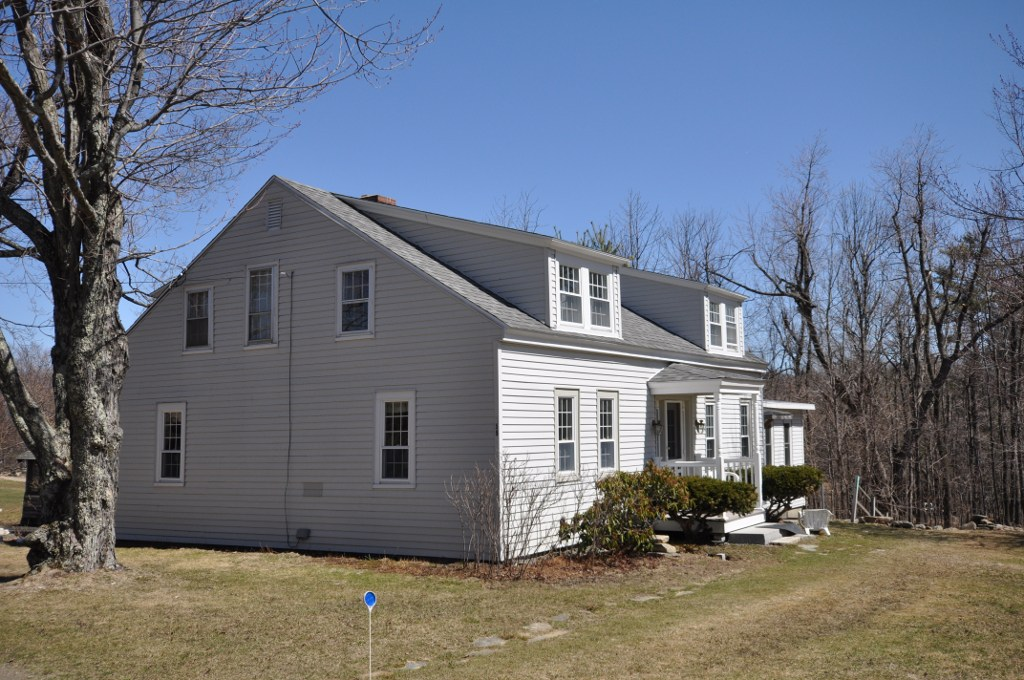

- Location within New Hampshire Location within the United States
- Location: Upper Jaffrey Rd., Dublin, New Hampshire
- Coordinates: 42°53′46″N 72°3′37″W
- Area: less than one acre
- Built: 1767
- Built by: Learned, Benjamin
- Architectural style: Cape Colonial
- MPS: Dublin MRA
- NRHP reference No.: 83004042
- Added to NRHP: December 18, 1983

The Benjamin Learned House is a historic house on Upper Jaffrey Road in Dublin, New Hampshire. Built in the late 1760s, it is one of the town's oldest surviving buildings. It is further notable for its association with the locally prominent Learned family, and for its role in the summer estate trend of the early 20th century. The house was listed on the National Register of Historic Places in 1983.

== Description and history ==
The Learned Homestead is located in a rural setting of southeastern Dublin, near the junction of Upper Jaffrey Road with Snow Hill Road. It is located south of the junction, on the east side of a drive that continues on to the Learned Homestead. It is a 1 1/2-story wood-frame structure, with a gabled roof and vinyl siding exterior. Its main facade is five bays wide, with sash windows arranged symmetrically around the entrance, which is sheltered by a hip-roofed portico supported by round columns. Two shed-roof dormers project from the front roof face. The interior's surviving original features include fireplaces and wooden paneling.

The house was built sometime between 1767 and 1770 by Benjamin Learned, one of Dublin's early settlers, and remained in his family's hands for over a century. Learned was prominent in local affairs, serving as town selectman, school commissioner, and deacon of the Congregational church for many years. In 1896, the house (along with Learned's nearby 1790 homestead) became part of Franklin MacVeagh's Knollwood summer estate. It was home to illustrator Jacob Bates Abbott in the early 1940s, and was sold out of the Knollwood estate in 1948.

== See also ==
- Amos Learned Farm, built by Benjamin Learned's sons
- National Register of Historic Places listings in Cheshire County, New Hampshire
