= Fasnacloich =

Historic house in New Hampshire, United States

- U.S. National Register of Historic Places
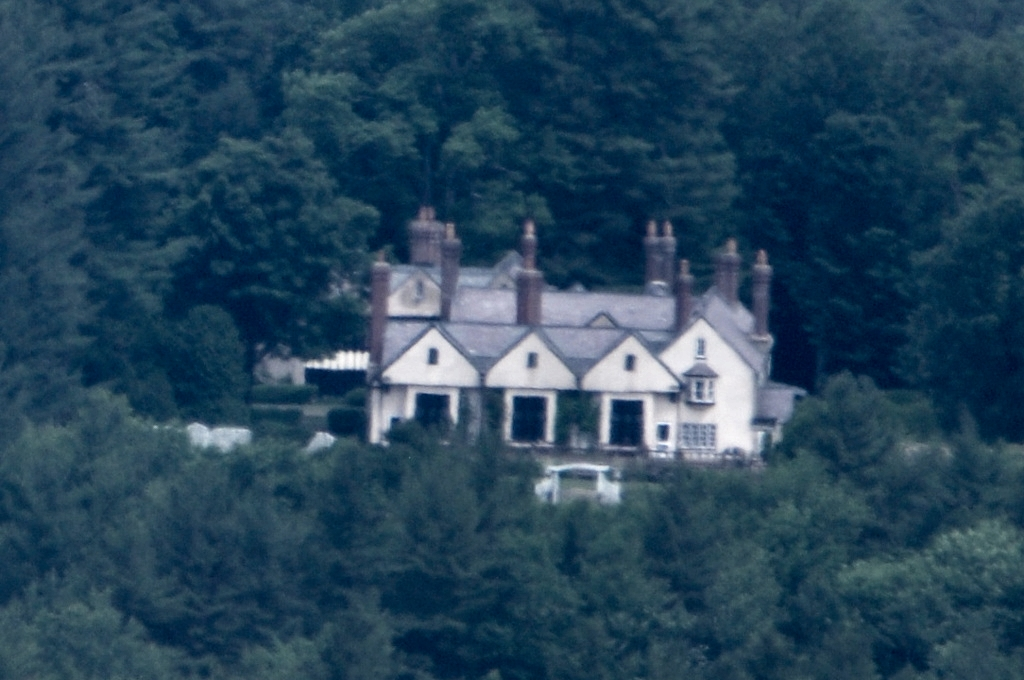
- The main house, as seen from several miles away on Mount Monadnock

- Location within New Hampshire Location within the United States
- Location: Four Hill Rd. N of Dublin town line, Harrisville, New Hampshire
- Coordinates: 42°55′27″N 72°6′30″W
- Area: 1.3 acres (0.53 ha)
- Built: 1911
- Architect: Bell, A.S.
- Architectural style: Late 19th And 20th Century Revivals, Late Medieval English manor
- MPS: Harrisville MRA
- NRHP reference No.: 86003245
- Added to NRHP: January 14, 1988

Fasnacloich is a historic country estate in Harrisville, New Hampshire. Built in 1911 and expanded in 1916–17, the estate is one of the most sophisticated and elaborate summer estates built in the Harrisville-Dublin area during its heyday as a summer resort area. The estate is located off MacVeagh Road, south of its junction with Mason Road. Its builders were Charles MacVeagh and Fanny Davenport Rogers MacVeagh. He is notable for being United States Ambassador to Japan, and they were the parents of diplomat Lincoln MacVeagh. The estate was listed on the National Register of Historic Places in 1988.

== Description ==
The MacVeaghs became interested in the Harrisville-Dublin area after visiting his uncle Franklin's estate of Knollwood. With an interest in their Scottish heritage, the MacVeaghs named their estate after a place associated with Mrs. MacVeagh's family, and built a recreation of a medieval country estate on a hill side with views of Mount Monadnock. The design inspiration of the main house is said to be Kelmscott Manor in England, the Scottish Fasnacloich having burned in the 19th century. It is a two-story masonry construction, with clusters of chimneys typical of Jacobean houses, and a slate roof. The house's wooden trim and window frames were made from wood that was harvested on the premises. The house is in an asymmetrical U shape, with the base of the U 114 feet (35 m) long, and arms of 70 feet (21 m) (south) and 58 feet (18 m) (north).

The house is approached by a long drive that ends in a circular are in front of the eastern facade, which has two entries sheltered by porches. The interior of the main wing includes an entry hall, three bedrooms, and a grand 60-foot (18 m) hall on the ground floor, whose walls are finished in half-timbering filled with stucco. The south wing houses a library and another large room, the two story "Terrace Room", which measures 17 feet (5.2 m) by 55 feet (17 m), and was used as a performance space. It is three fireplaces and three monumentally large windows made of small leaded panes; these windows stand under steeply pitched gables. The south wing is connected to the north wing via a cloister-like walkway along the west side of the main wing.

The north wing houses the kitchen, servant work areas, a large dining room, and smoking room on the first floor. There is an Episcopal chapel on the second floor. To the north of this wing is the 1916-17 addition, with a greatly expanded library. Bookcases line the walls, separated by paired Tuscan columns in this room, which measures 31 by 46 feet (9.4 m × 14.0 m).

The most prominent feature of the estate's landscaping is the four-level terrace that extends down the hill from the south wing. The top level has a fieldstone retaining wall topped by a balustrade with Jacobean balusters. The garden descends to the fourth level, where there is an octagonal pool at whose center is fountain imported from Italy.

== History ==
Plans for the house were drafted by A. S. Bell, although credit for most of its design and decoration go to Fanny MacVeagh. The MacVeaghs are known to have had as guests a wide variety of acquaintances from political, social, artistic, and literary circles.

== See also ==
- Adams Farm (Harrisville, New Hampshire), a nearby MacVeagh property
- National Register of Historic Places listings in Cheshire County, New Hampshire
