= Learned Homestead =

Historic house in New Hampshire, United States

- U.S. National Register of Historic Places
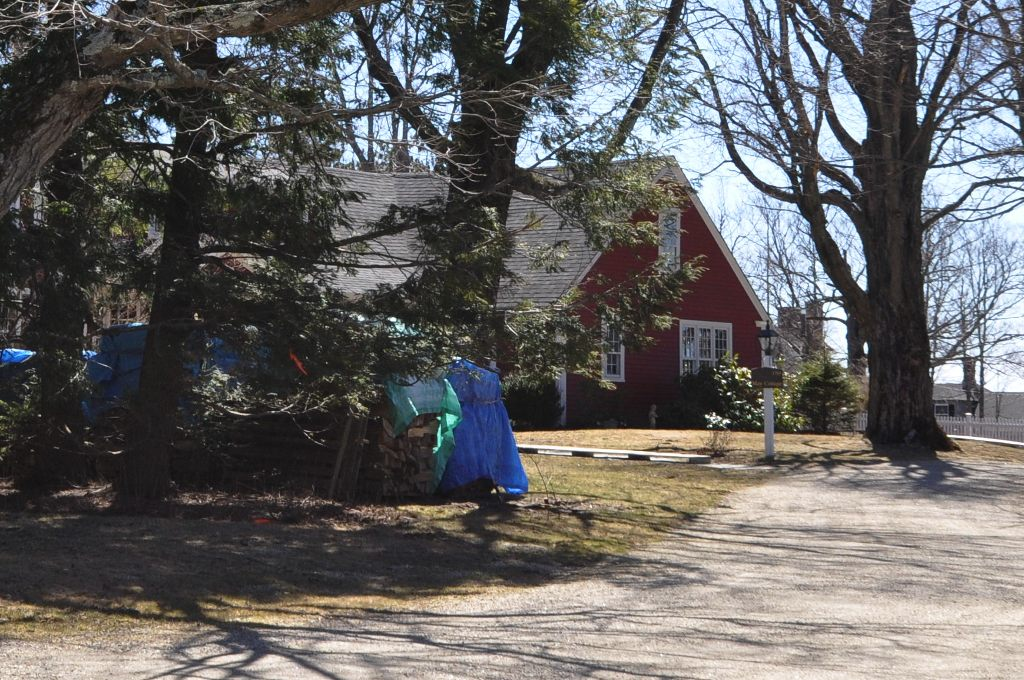

- Location within New Hampshire Location within the United States
- Location: Upper Jaffrey Rd., Dublin, New Hampshire
- Coordinates: 42°53′41″N 72°3′37″W
- Area: less than one acre
- Built: 1790
- Architectural style: Cape Cottage
- MPS: Dublin MRA
- NRHP reference No.: 83004043
- Added to NRHP: December 15, 1983

The Learned Homestead is a historic farmstead on Upper Jaffrey Road in Dublin, New Hampshire. Built about 1790, it is a well-preserved example of an early farmstead, and one of the few surviving in the town from the 18th century. It is also noticeable for its association with the locally prominent Learned family, and for the summer estate movement of the early 20th century. The house was listed on the National Register of Historic Places in 1983.

== Description and history ==
The Learned Homestead is located in a rural setting of southeastern Dublin, near the junction of Upper Jaffrey Road with Snow Hill Road. It is located south of the junction, down a drive that first passes the Benjamin Learned House, a similar yet older house. This house is a 1 1/2-story wood-frame structure, with a gabled roof and clapboarded exterior. It has a five-bay front facade with center entrance, and a large central chimney. A cross-gabled ell extends from one side, and a large 19th-century barn is located across the drive.

The house was built about 1790 by Deacon Benjamin Learned, who had built the house just to its north in the 1760s. Learned was prominent in town affairs, serving as town selectman, on the school committee, and as deacon of the Congregational church. The property was owned by his descendants until about 1898, when it was purchased by Franklin MacVeagh. MacVeagh incorporated it into his Knollwood estate, and used this house as an office. It was sold out of that estate in the 1940s, at which time it underwent a sympathetic restoration under new owners.

== See also ==
- Benjamin Learned House - nearby later home of Benjamin Learned
- Amos Learned Farm - built by his sons
- National Register of Historic Places listings in Cheshire County, New Hampshire
