= Adams Farm (Harrisville, New Hampshire) =

Historic house in New Hampshire, United States

- U.S. National Register of Historic Places
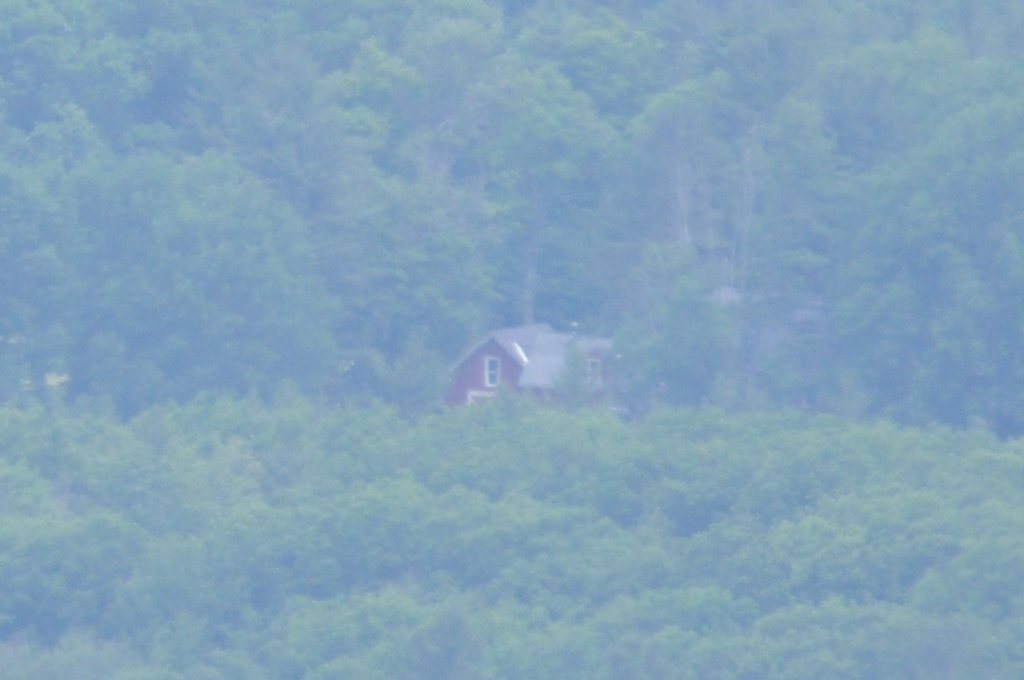
- View of main house (as much as is visible) from the slopes of Mount Monadnock

- Location within New Hampshire Location within the United States
- Location: Off MacVeagh Rd. near Fasnacloich, Harrisville, New Hampshire
- Coordinates: 42°55′41″N 72°7′24″W
- Area: 1 acre (0.40 ha)
- Built: 1780
- MPS: Harrisville MRA
- NRHP reference No.: 86003246
- Added to NRHP: January 14, 1988

The Adams Farm is a historic farmhouse on MacVeagh Road in Harrisville, New Hampshire. With a construction history dating to about 1780, and its later association with the nearby Fasnacloich estate, it has more than two centuries of ownership by just two families. The house and a small plot of land around it were listed on the National Register of Historic Places in 1988.

== Description and history ==
The Adams Farm is located in southern Harrisville, on the southwest side of MacVeagh Road north of Howe Reservoir. The farmhouse is set high on a ridge, with commanding views of Mount Monadnock to the south. It is a three-story wood-frame structure, with a gabled roof and clapboarded exterior. The main facade is five bays wide, with a projecting polygonal bay to the left of the centered entrance. Attached to the west side of this structure is an older 1½-story frame structure, which has two gabled dormers in its gabled roof. Its western end is attached to a small barn. The basic styling of the exterior is Greek Revival, although the window bay and main entrance are later Victorian modifications, and the window shutters, which exhibit a pine tree cutout pattern, are a 20th-century Colonial Revival addition.

The oldest portion of the house is the ell, at least part of which dates to c. 1780 and was built by Moses Adams, Jr. The property remained in the Adams family until about 1910, when it was purchased by Charles MacVeagh, who owned the nearby Fasnacloich estate, one of Harrisville's finest early 20th-century summer estates. MacVeagh used the Adams Farm as an extension of Fasnacloich, stabling horses there and using his farming staff to work the land.

== See also ==
- National Register of Historic Places listings in Cheshire County, New Hampshire
