= Duane Morris =

Law firm headquartered in Philadelphia, Pennsylvania

Duane Morris LLP
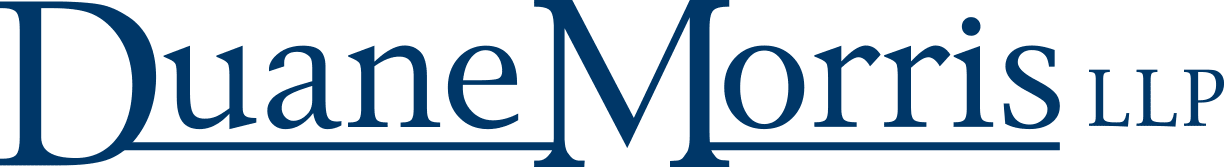
- Headquarters: Philadelphia, Pennsylvania
- No. of offices: 29
- No. of attorneys: 742 (2025)
- Major practice areas: General practice
- Key people: Matthew A. Taylor (Chair); Charles J. O'Donnell (COO)
- Revenue: ▲US$758,380,000 (2025)
- Profit per equity partner: US$1,682,000 (2025)
- Date founded: 1904; 122 years ago
- Founder: Russell Duane; Steven Heckscher; Roland S. Morris
- Company type: Limited liability partnership
- Website: duanemorris.com

Duane Morris LLP is a law firm headquartered in Philadelphia, Pennsylvania. The firm was founded in 1904 as Duane, Morris, Heckscher, & Roberts, and has offices in the United States, London, Singapore, Shanghai, Myanmar, Vietnam, and Australia.

== Ranking and recognition ==
In 2026, U.S. News & World Report recognized Duane Morris as one of the 'Best Companies to Work for' in the Law Firms category and awarded the firm top-tier national rankings in bankruptcy and creditor debtor rights/insolvency and reorganization law, construction law and litigation, employee benefits law, health care law, immigration, insurance, patent law and venture capital law.

In 2025, the Am Law 200 ranked Duane Morris as the 82nd largest law firm in the United States based on gross revenue. The firm was ranked 74th in the U.S. based on size by the National Law Journal's 2025 NLJ 500 ranking.

== Growth ==
Chair Sheldon Bonovitz stepped down at the beginning of January 2008 and was replaced by former Vice Chair John J. Soroko. Soroko became chairman emeritus in 2017 when Matthew A. Taylor took over as chairman and CEO.

As of 2026, the firm had about 750 attorneys across 29 offices.

In February 2020, Duane Morris merged with Satterlee Stephens.

== Notable cases and deals ==
- Markman v. Westview Instruments, Inc.: Duane Morris represented the plaintiff Markman in a patent infringement lawsuit.
- Tobacco Industry Litigation: Duane Morris and the Pittsburgh law firm of Buchanan Ingersoll represented the Commonwealth of Pennsylvania in a 46-state class action lawsuit against the tobacco industry. The litigation concluded in 1998 with a $206 billion global settlement agreement for the 46 suing states.

== Notable alumni ==
- Barbara Adams, general counsel of Pennsylvania, under Governor Rendell
- Michael Baylson, federal judge for the United States District Court for the Eastern District of Pennsylvania
- Roland S. Morris, former United States Ambassador to Japan, one of the founding partners of the firm
- Gene E. K. Pratter, federal judge for the United States District Court for the Eastern District of Pennsylvania
- Marjorie Rendell, circuit judge in the United States Court of Appeals for the Third Circuit
- Mark Singel, lieutenant governor of Pennsylvania from 1987 to 1995. Joined the firm in 2000 after leaving public service and left to start his own firm in 2005.
