= Wayne MacVeagh =

American attorney general and diplomat (1833–1917)

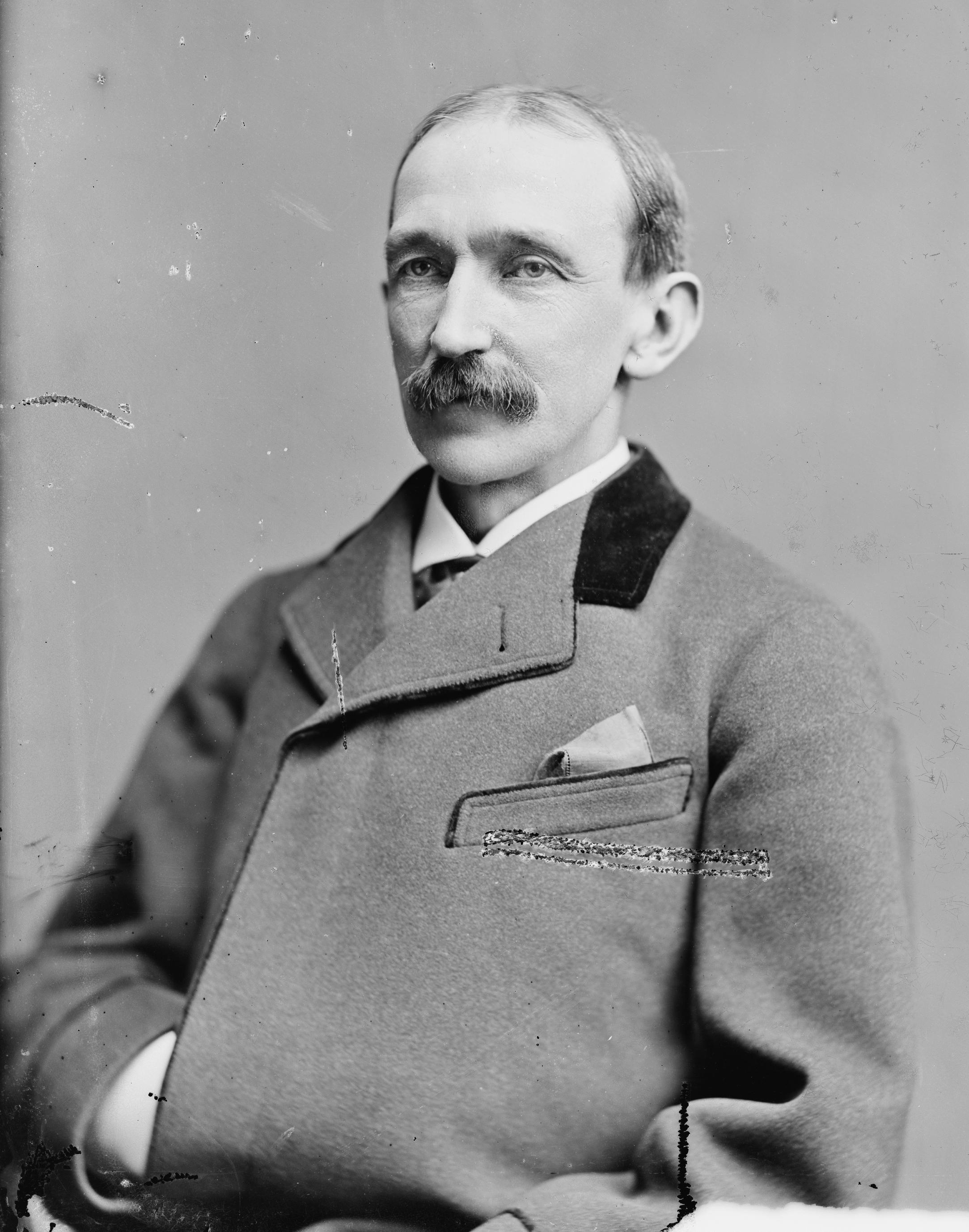
- MacVeagh, c. 1865–1880

United States Ambassador to Italy
- In office March 11, 1894 – March 4, 1897
- President: Grover Cleveland
- Preceded by: William Potter
- Succeeded by: William Draper

36th United States Attorney General
- In office March 5, 1881 – December 15, 1881
- President: James A. Garfield; Chester A. Arthur
- Preceded by: Charles Devens
- Succeeded by: Benjamin H. Brewster

United States Ambassador to the Ottoman Empire
- In office October 25, 1870 – June 10, 1871
- President: Ulysses S. Grant
- Preceded by: Edward Morris
- Succeeded by: George Boker

Personal details
- Born: Isaac Wayne MacVeagh; April 19, 1833 Phoenixville, Pennsylvania, U.S.
- Died: January 11, 1917 (aged 83) Washington, D.C., U.S.
- Party: Republican (before 1892, 1896–1917); Democratic (1892–1896)
- Spouse(s): Letitia Miner Lewis (m. 1856) Virginia Rolette Cameron (m. 1866)
- Relations: Franklin MacVeagh (brother)
- Children: Charles
- Education: Yale University (BA)

Military service
- Allegiance: United States
- Branch/service: Militia; Union Army
- Years of service: 1862–1863
- Rank: Major
- Battles/wars: American Civil War

Isaac Wayne MacVeagh (April 19, 1833 – January 11, 1917) was an American lawyer, politician and diplomat. He served as the 36th Attorney General of the United States under the administrations of Presidents James A. Garfield and Chester A. Arthur.

== Biography ==
=== Early life ===
MacVeagh was born in Phoenixville, Pennsylvania, on April 19, 1833, the son of Major MacVeagh and Margaret (née Lincoln) McVeagh. His brother, Franklin MacVeagh, was a Chicago wholesale grocer, banker and U.S. Secretary of the Treasury under President William Howard Taft.

He attended Yale University, where he was a brother of the Delta Kappa Epsilon fraternity (Phi chapter), and graduated tenth in his class in 1853. He was admitted to the bar in 1856, and was the District Attorney of Chester County, Pennsylvania, from 1859 through 1864. During the American Civil War he joined the emergency militia of Pennsylvania that was organized against the threat of Confederate invasion in 1862 and 1863. He raised an independent cavalry company and later served in the 29th Emergency Militia Regiment, reaching the rank of major.

=== Politician and lawyer ===
MacVeagh became a leader in the Republican Party, and was a prominent opponent of his father-in-law, Simon Cameron, in the fight within the party in 1871. He was the Ambassador to the Ottoman Empire in 1870 through 1871, and was a member of the state constitutional convention of 1872 and 1873.

In 1875, MacVeagh co-founded the Philadelphia-based law firm known today as Dechert LLP. He also served as Chairman of the MacVeagh Commission, sent in 1877 by President Rutherford B. Hayes to Louisiana, which secured the settlement of the contest between two existing state governments and thus made possible the withdrawal of U.S. troops from the state.

MacVeagh served as the 36th Attorney General in 1881 under President James A. Garfield. He resigned after President Garfield's assassination. Chester Arthur was to be 21st President and MacVeagh served as a cabinet member.

In 1892, he supported Grover Cleveland, the Democratic nominee for the presidency, and from 1893 to 1897 he served as Ambassador to Italy. He returned to the Republican Party in 1896. In 1897, he was elected to the American Philosophical Society. In 1903, he was a chief counsel of the United States before the Hague tribunal in the case regarding the claims of Germany, Britain and Italy against the republic of Venezuela.

After the outbreak of World War I MacVeagh championed the cause of the Allies in an article "The Impossible Chasm", contributed to the North American Review in July 1915. In his last article "Lusitania Day: May 7, 1916", for the same magazine, he assailed the slowness of the American government in asserting its rights against Germany.

== Personal life ==
MacVeagh married Letitia Miner Lewis, in 1856. They had one son, Charles MacVeagh (June 6, 1860 – December 4, 1931), who became the Ambassador to Japan.

In 1866, after his first wife's death, he married Virginia Rolette Cameron, a daughter of U.S. Secretary of War Simon Cameron.

MacVeagh died in Washington, D.C., on January 11, 1917. He was buried at the Church of the Redeemer Cemetery in Bryn Mawr, Pennsylvania.

== See also ==
Diplomatic posts
Preceded by Edward J. Morris	United States Ambassador to the Ottoman Empire; October 25, 1870 – June 10, 1871	Succeeded by George H. Boker
Preceded by William Potter	United States Ambassador to Italy; March 11, 1894 – March 4, 1897	Succeeded by William F. Draper
Legal offices
Preceded by Charles Devens	U.S. Attorney General; Served under: James A. Garfield, Chester A. Arthur; March 5, 1881 – December 15, 1881	Succeeded by Benjamin H. Brewster
