= Frank D. Pavey =

American politician

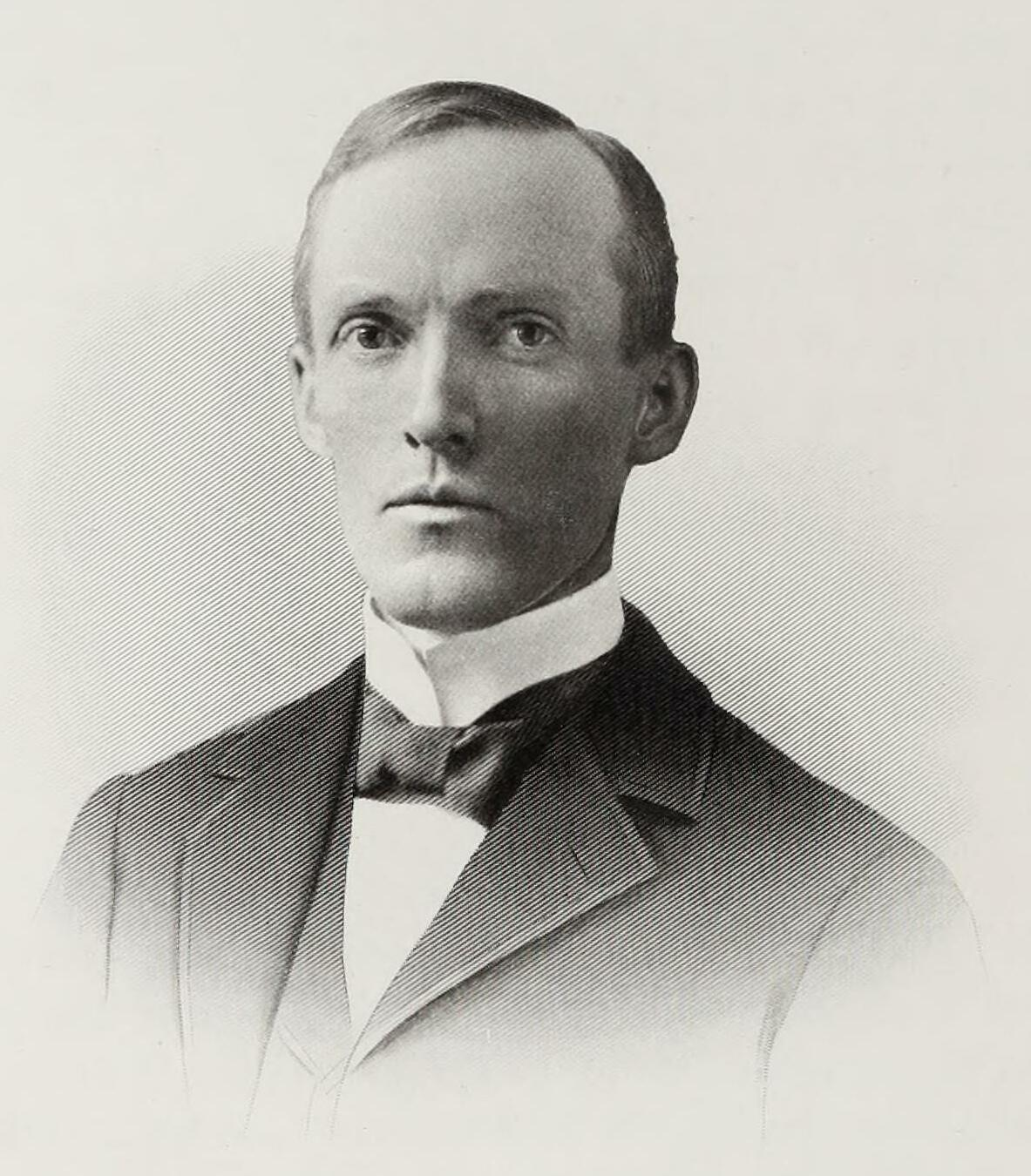
Frank D. Pavey c. 1900

Frank Dunlap Pavey (November 10, 1860 – April 15, 1946) was an American lawyer and politician from New York.

== Biography ==
Frank D. Pavey was born in Washington Court House, Ohio on November 10, 1860. He graduated B.A. from Yale College in 1884, LL.B. from Yale Law School in 1886, and LL.M. from Yale Law School in 1889. Then he was admitted to the bar, and practiced law in New York City.

Pavey was a member of the New York State Assembly (New York Co., 11th D.) in 1895.

He was a member of the New York State Senate (15th D.) from 1896 to 1898, sitting in the 119th, 120th and 121st New York State Legislatures.

He continued to practice law, and was active on political, economical, and foreign relations issues.

He died at his home in New York City on April 15, 1946.

New York State Assembly
Preceded by James R. Sheffield	New York State Assembly; New York County, 11th District; 1895	Succeeded by William H. Gledhill
New York State Senate
Preceded by George W. Robertson	New York State Senate; 15th District; 1896–1898	Succeeded by Nathaniel A. Elsberg
