= Edward B. Osborne =

American politician

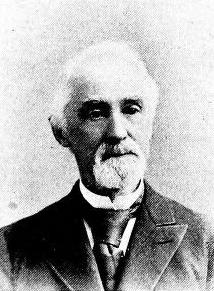
Edward B. Osborne (1893)

Edward Butler Osborne (August 3, 1814 Northampton, Hampshire County, Massachusetts – July 20, 1893 Albany, New York) was an American newspaper publisher and politician from New York.

== Life ==
He learned the printer's trade at the Northampton Gazette, and then worked for the Salem Landmark. In 1837, he co-published the Quincy Patriot. From 1837 to 1853, he published the Danbury Times. In 1853, he bought the Poughkeepsie American and renamed it the Dutchess Democrat. In 1856, he merged his paper with the Poughkeepsie Telegraph, and published it until 1883, when he retired.

He was a member of the New York State Assembly (Dutchess Co., 2nd D.) in 1884 and 1885; Clerk of Dutchess County from 1886 to 1888; again a member of the State Assembly in 1891; and a member of the New York State Senate (15th D.) in 1892 and 1893.

He was found dead in his bed on the morning of July 20, 1893, at his lodgings in Clinton Avenue, in Albany.

== Sources ==
- The New York Red Book compiled by Edgar L. Murlin (published by James B. Lyon, Albany NY, 1897; pg. 403f, 503f and 508)
- New York State Legislative Souvenir for 1893 with Portraits of the Members of Both Houses by Henry P. Phelps (pg. 16f)
- DEATH OF SENATOR OSBORNE in NYT on July 21, 1893

New York State Assembly
Preceded by Edgar A. Briggs	New York State Assembly; Dutchess County, 2nd District; 1884–1885	Succeeded by John I. Platt
Preceded by Johnston L. DePeyster	New York State Assembly; Dutchess County, 2nd District; 1891	Succeeded by James A. Vanderwater
New York State Senate
Preceded by Gilbert A. Deane	New York State Senate; 15th District; 1892–1893	Succeeded by George W. Robertson
