= George W. Robertson =

American politician

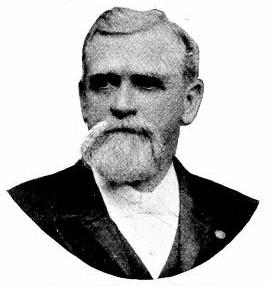
George W. Robertson (1894)

George W. Robertson (October 19, 1838 in New York City – September 17, 1906 in Peekskill, Westchester County, New York) was an American manufacturer and politician from New York.

== Life ==
He attended Peekskill Military Academy and Charlottesville University Mechanics Institute, and then became a carpenter. During the American Civil War, he fought with the 71st New York Volunteers. After the war he engaged in the manufacture of stoves in Peekskill.

Robertson was a member of the New York State Assembly (Westchester Co., 3rd D.) in 1882.

He was a member of the New York State Senate (15th D.) in 1894 and 1895, and was a member of the Lexow Committee.

He was President of the Village of Peekskill from 1897 to 1899.

He died on September 17, 1906, at his home in Peekskill, New York, "after a long illness, from paralysis", and was buried at the Hillside Cemetery in Cortlandt Manor.

== Sources ==
- The New York Red Book compiled by Edgar L. Murlin (published by James B. Lyon, Albany NY, 1897; pg. 404 and 502)
- Sketches of the members of the Legislature in The Evening Journal Almanac (1895; pg. 49)
- THE PEEKSKILL ELECTION in NYT on March 3, 1897
- GEORGE W. ROBERTSON DEAD in NYT on September 18, 1906

New York State Assembly
Preceded by James W. Husted	New York State Assembly; Westchester County, 3rd District; 1882	Succeeded by John Hoag
New York State Senate
Preceded by Edward B. Osborne	New York State Senate; 15th District; 1894–1895	Succeeded by Frank D. Pavey
