= Roland S. Morris =

American lawyer and diplomat (1874-1945)

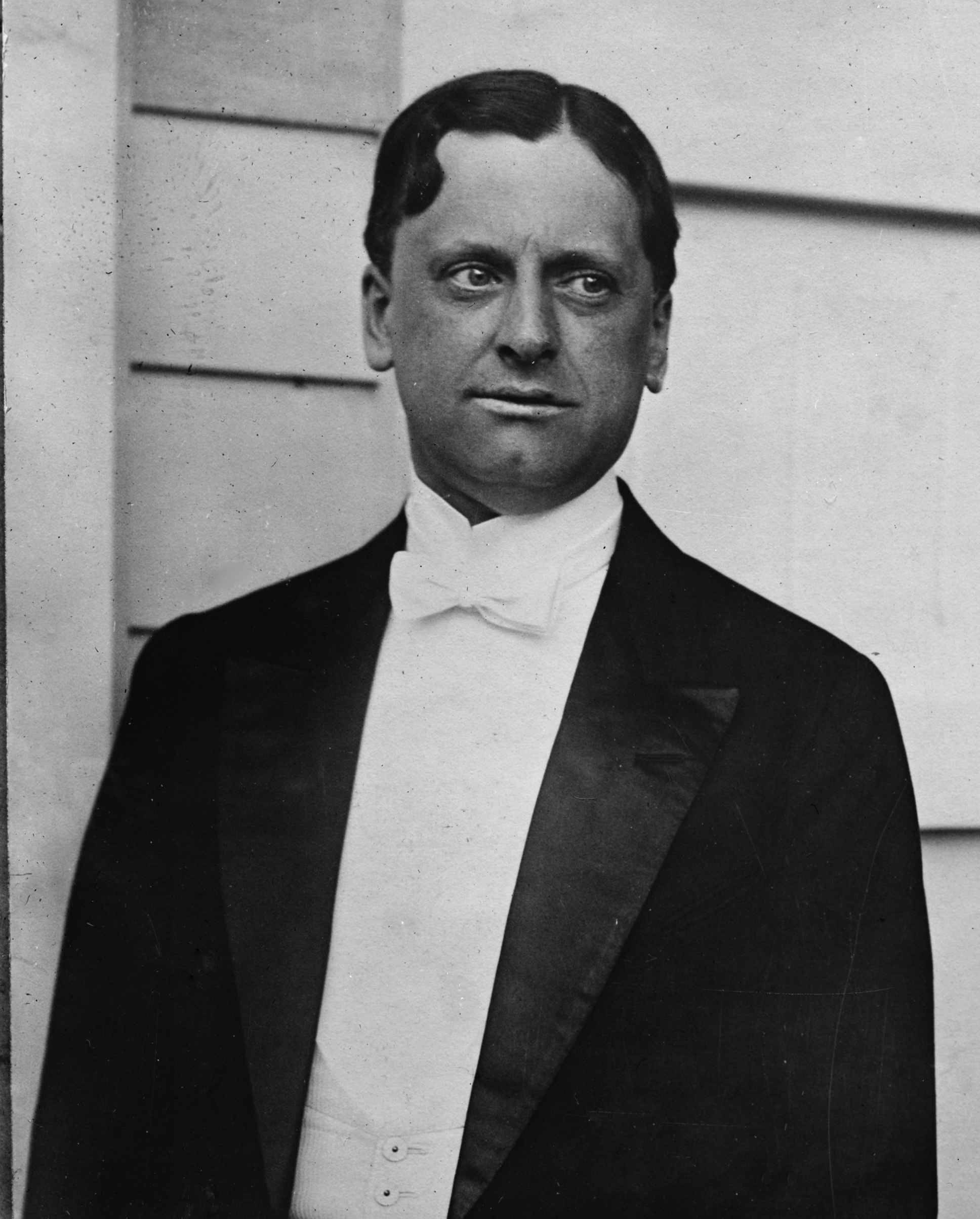
- Morris, c. 1915–1920

United States Ambassador to Japan
- In office October 30, 1917 – May 15, 1920
- President: Woodrow Wilson
- Preceded by: George W. Guthrie
- Succeeded by: Charles B. Warren

Personal details
- Born: Roland Sletor Morris; March 11, 1874 Olympia, Washington, U.S.
- Died: January 23, 1945 (aged 70)
- Resting place: Laurel Hill Cemetery, Philadelphia, Pennsylvania, U.S.
- Party: Democratic
- Education: Princeton University (A.B., L.L.B.)

Roland Sletor Morris (March 11, 1874 – November 23, 1945) was an American lawyer and diplomat. He was one of the founders of the Philadelphia-based law firm Duane Morris in 1904 and served as the United States Ambassador to Japan from 1917 to 1920.

== Early life and education ==
He was born in Olympia, Washington in 1874 and graduated from the Lawrenceville School in 1892. He received his A.B. degree from Princeton University in 1896 and his L.L.B. degree from the same school in 1899.

== Career ==
In 1904, he became a member of the law firm Duane, Morris and Heckscher.

He was appointed United States Ambassador to Japan by Woodrow Wilson on August 1, 1917 and served in that role from October 30, 1917 to May 15, 1920.

On September 20, 1917, a special dinner event was held to honor Morris in his new position as Ambassador to Japan. This event was attended by six hundred guests, including most members of Philadelphia judiciary and other active civic members of the city. The speakers at this diplomatic gathering included: Thomas B. Smith Mayor of Philadelphia, Aimaro Satō Japanese Ambassador to the U.S., Frank Lyon Polk (Counselor for the U.S. Department of State), Alexander Mitchell Palmer (soon to be U.S. Attorney General) and Robert von Moschzisker (Justice of the Supreme Court of Pennsylvania from 1909 to 1921 and Chief Justice from 1921 to 1930). Other prominent guests included U.S. Senators Boies Penrose and Philander C. Knox. The event took place at the Bellevue-Stratford Hotel, in Philadelphia.

Morris conducted a series of negotiations with Kijūrō Shidehara, the Japanese Ambassador to the United States, to address alien land laws which limited the ability of Japanese immigrants to achieve full citizenship in the United States. Morris maintained good relations with Japanese colleagues after his stint as ambassador and welcomed diginitaries such as Tsuneo Matsudaira to present to the Philadelphia Chamber of Commerce in 1925.

He collaborated with Thomas Garrigue Masaryk during World War I in a question about the Czechoslovak Legions.

In 1934, he lost the Pennsylvania Democratic U.S. Senate primary to Joseph Guffey, who was subsequently elected.

He was one of the founding partners of the law firm of Duane Morris, in Philadelphia.

He was interred at the Laurel Hill Cemetery in Philadelphia.

== Publications ==
- Report of the Honorable Roland S. Morris on Japanese Immigration and Alleged Discriminatory Legislation Against Japanese Residents in the United States, Washington, D.C.: Government Printing Office, 1921

Diplomatic posts
Preceded by George W. Guthrie	U.S. Ambassador to Japan; 1917–1920	Succeeded by Charles B. Warren
