= Thomas J. Baldrige =

American judge

Thomas Jackson Baldrige
- 1945, official photograph

President Judge of the Superior Court of Pennsylvania
- In office January 17, 1945 – March 1, 1947
- Preceded by: William H. Keller
- Succeeded by: Chester H. Rhodes

Associate Judge of the Superior Court of Pennsylvania
- In office January 28, 1929 – January 17, 1945

Attorney General of Pennsylvania
- In office January 18, 1927 – January 28, 1929
- Governor: John Stuchell Fisher
- Preceded by: George Washington Woodruff
- Succeeded by: Cyrus Woods

Personal details
- Born: April 5, 1872 Hollidaysburg, Pennsylvania
- Died: January 27, 1964 (aged 91) Altoona, Pennsylvania
- Party: Republican
- Spouse: Anna P. Dean
- Education: Bucknell University
- Occupation: Judge, lawyer

Thomas Jackson Baldrige (April 5, 1872 – January 27, 1964) was a Pennsylvania lawyer and judge. He served part of a term as state Attorney General, and then on the state's Superior Court for over twenty years, the last two as President Judge.

== Life and career ==
Baldrige was born the son of Howard Malcolm and Laura Mattern Baldrige. His father was a prominent Blair County lawyer. Baldrige attended Phillips Academy, Bucknell University, and the University of Pennsylvania Law School. He read law with his father, and was admitted to the Blair County bar in 1895.

He married Anna P. Dean in 1917.

In 1910, he was appointed President Judge of the Blair County counts, and then elected for two ten-year terms. In 1927, he resigned to become state Attorney General. In 1929, he was appointed to the Superior Court of Pennsylvania, then elected later in 1929 and again in 1939 to ten-year terms. In 1945, he was commissioned President Judge of the court, and then resigned in 1947, due to hearing.

== Notable relatives ==
His father's older brother was Howard Hammond Baldrige, a Nebraska state senator, Howard Hammond was the father of Howard Malcolm, a Nebraska congressman. Howard Malcolm was the father of Howard Malcolm, Jr., and Letitia, Jacqueline Kennedy's Social Secretary.

Legal offices
Preceded by George Washington Woodruff	Attorney General of Pennsylvania; 1927-1929	Succeeded by Cyrus Woods
