= George Henry Boker =

American poet, playwright, and diplomat (1823–1890)

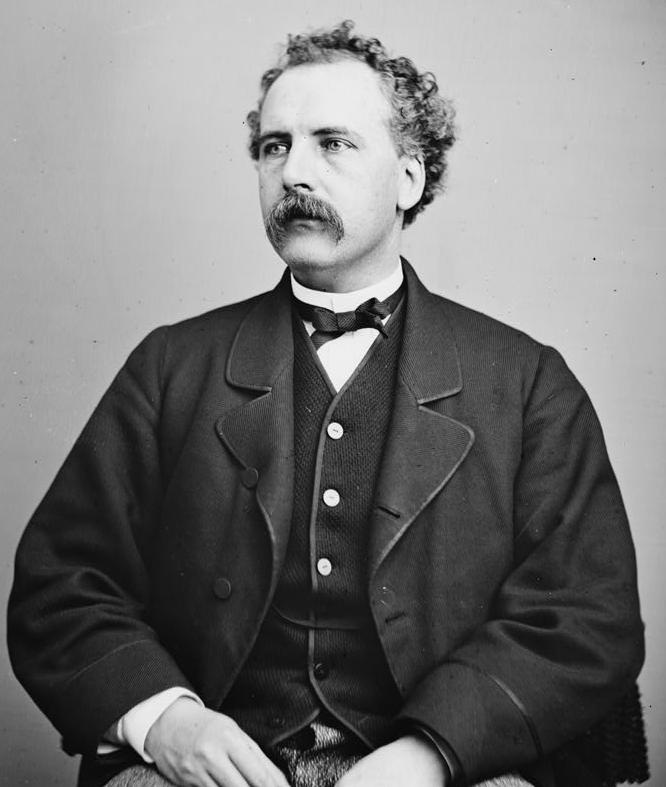
- Boker, 1855–1865
- Born: October 6, 1823; Philadelphia, Pennsylvania, U.S.
- Died: January 2, 1890 (aged 66); Philadelphia, Pennsylvania, U.S.
- Resting place: Laurel Hill Cemetery, Philadelphia, Pennsylvania, U.S.
- Occupations: poet, playwright, diplomat

George Henry Boker (October 6, 1823 – January 2, 1890) was an American poet, playwright, and diplomat.

== Early years and education ==
Boker was born in Philadelphia. His father was Charles S. Boker, a wealthy banker, whose financial expertise weathered the Girard National Bank through the panic years of 1838–40, and whose honour, impugned after his 1857 death, was defended many years later by his son in "The Book of the Dead." Charles Boker was also a director of the Mechanics National Bank.

Boker was brought up in an atmosphere of ease and refinement, receiving his preparatory education in private schools, and entering Princeton University in 1840. While there he helped found, and was first editor of, the college literary magazine, the Nassau Monthly (now the Nassau Lit).

He was left in easy circumstances, and was able to devote his time to literature, as well as boxing and dancing.

Charles Godfrey Leland, a relative, recounted:

As a mere schoolboy, Boker's knowledge of poetry was remarkable. I can remember that he even at nine years of age manifested that wonderful gift that caused him many years after to be characterized by some great actor—I think it was Forrest—as the best reader in America ... While at college ... Shakespeare and Byron were his favourites. He used to quiz me sometimes for my predilections for Wordsworth and Coleridge. We both loved Shelley passionately.

Boker graduated from Princeton in 1842. His marriage to Julia Riggs, of Maryland, followed shortly after, while he was studying law, a profession which was to serve him in good stead during his diplomatic years, but which he gave up for the stronger pull of poetry.

== Literary recognition ==
In 1848 his first volume of verse, The Lessons of Life, and other Poems, was published.

Also, he met Bayard Taylor and Richard Henry Stoddard, who would be long-lasting friends. This group of young men supported and encouraged each other in the face of official journalistic criticism.

Launched in the literary life, Boker began to write assiduously. His first play, Calaynos, went into two editions during 1848, and the following year was played by Samuel Phelps at Sadler's Wells Theatre, London, May 10. This tragedy is notable for its depiction of the racial issues between the Spanish and the Moors.

This was soon followed by other plays. The next to be staged was a comedy, The Betrothal (1850). Two other tragedies from this time are Anne Boleyn (1850) and Leonor de Guzman (1853).

During this time, in correspondence with his friends, Boker was determining to himself the distinction between poetic and dramatic style. But Boker was not wholly wed to theatrical demands; he still approached the stage in the spirit of the poet who was torn between loyalty to poetic indirectness, and necessity for direct dialogue.

Francesca da Rimini (1853) is the play he is best remembered for. It is a verse tragedy based on the story of Francesca da Rimini and her lover Paolo, told in the fifth canto of Dante's Inferno. Boker published the original version, called the reading version, but used an acting version for the stage which had more directness and dramatic flow. This allowed for a compromise between the poet of the reading version and the demands of the theatre. "Francesca da Rimini is one of our finest verse dramas, certainly the best American romantic tragedy written before the twentieth century," according to Myron Matlaw in the preface to a 1967 anthology of 19th-century plays. Lawrence Barrett played Lanciotto and toured the US in 1885.

The American Civil War not only turned Boker's pen to the Union Cause, but changed him politically from a Democrat to a staunch Republican. In fact, his name is closely interwoven with the rehabilitation of the Republican party in Philadelphia. His volume "Poems of the War," was issued in 1864.

In 1862, the Union League Club was founded, with Boker as the leading spirit; through his efforts the war earnestness of the city was concentrated here; from 1863 to 1871 he served as its secretary; from 1879 to 1884 as its president. But Boker's thoughts were also concerned with poetry. In 1869, Boker issued Königsmark, The Legend of the Hounds and other Poems, and this ended his dramatic career until his return from abroad.

== Diplomatic activities ==
President Ulysses S. Grant sent Boker to Constantinople, as U.S. Minister (his appointment dated November 3, 1871)—an honor undoubtedly bestowed in recognition of his national service. Here he remained four years, "and during that time secured the redress for wrongs done American subjects by the Syrians, and successfully negotiated two treaties, one having reference to the extradition of criminals, and the other to the naturalization of subjects of little power in the dominions of the other."

Boker's initial enthusiasm for Turkish scenery and culture was unbounded, but after a time, his ignorance of the tongue, and distrust of interpreters, contributed to his frustration. By the time his Government was ready to transfer him to another post he was glad to leave Turkey. Despite this, he had developed his diplomatic skills and shown a talent for cultivating personal contacts.

In 1875, he was transferred to Russia, which was considered a more prestigious position.

The new political administration resulting from the 1876 American election viewed Boker unfavorably. Despite securing support from Emperor Alexander II of Russia, Boker was recalled in 1878.

== Later years ==
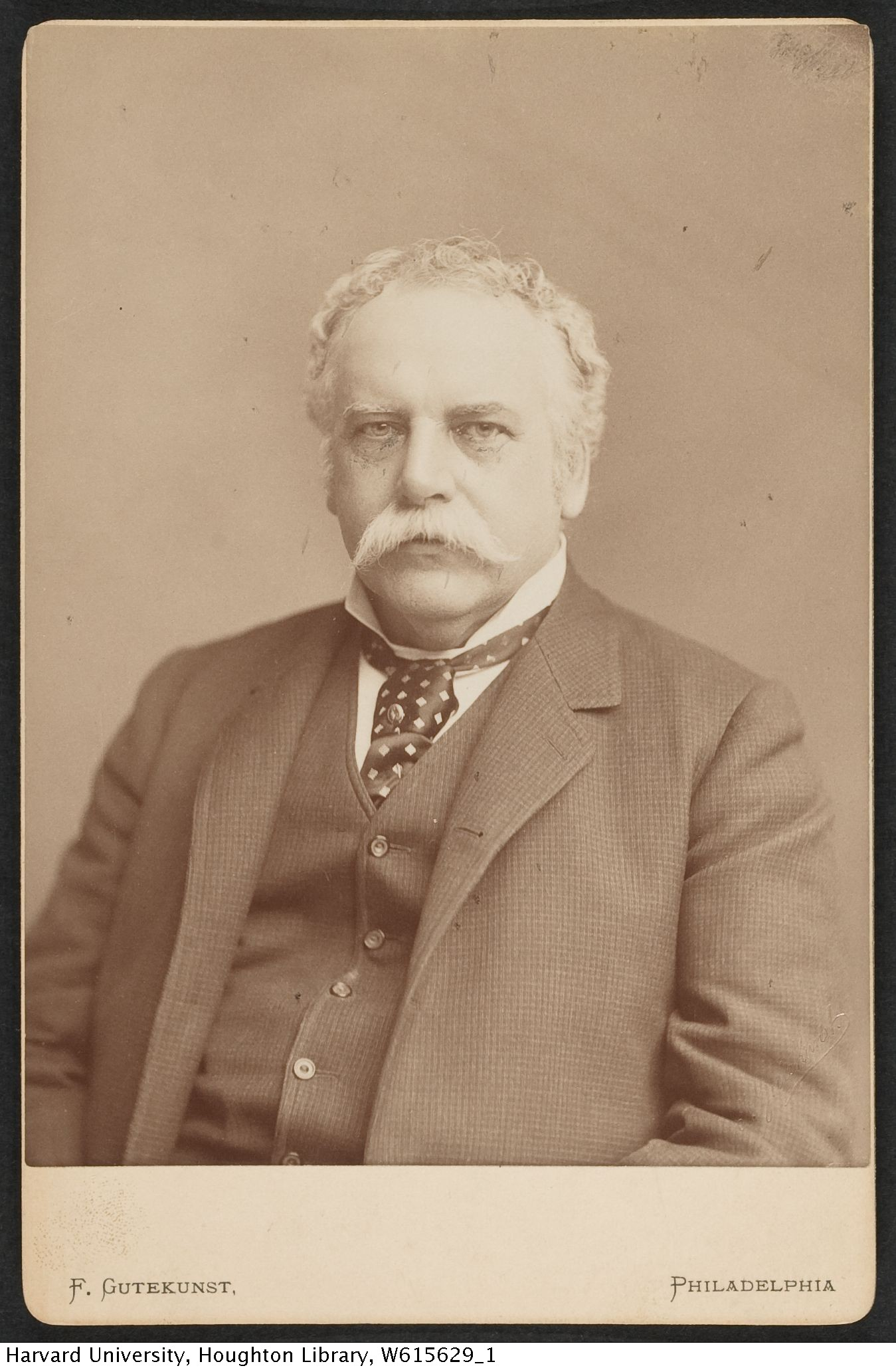
Boker in his later years by Frederick Gutekunst

On January 15, 1878, Boker withdrew from diplomatic life, returning to the United States. At this time he was depressed, feeling that both his literary and diplomatic careers had been failures.

In 1882 Lawrence Barrett mounted a revival of Francesca da Rimini. This brought more public interest in Boker and his other work, which necessitated the reprinting of several of his books. In 1884, he was elected as a member to the American Philosophical Society.

His home in Philadelphia—one of the literary centres of the time,—bore traces of his Turkish stay—carpets brought from Constantinople, Arabic designs on the draperies, and rich Eastern colours in the tapestried chairs.

Boker was also a director of the Mechanics National Bank of Philadelphia for several years later in his life.

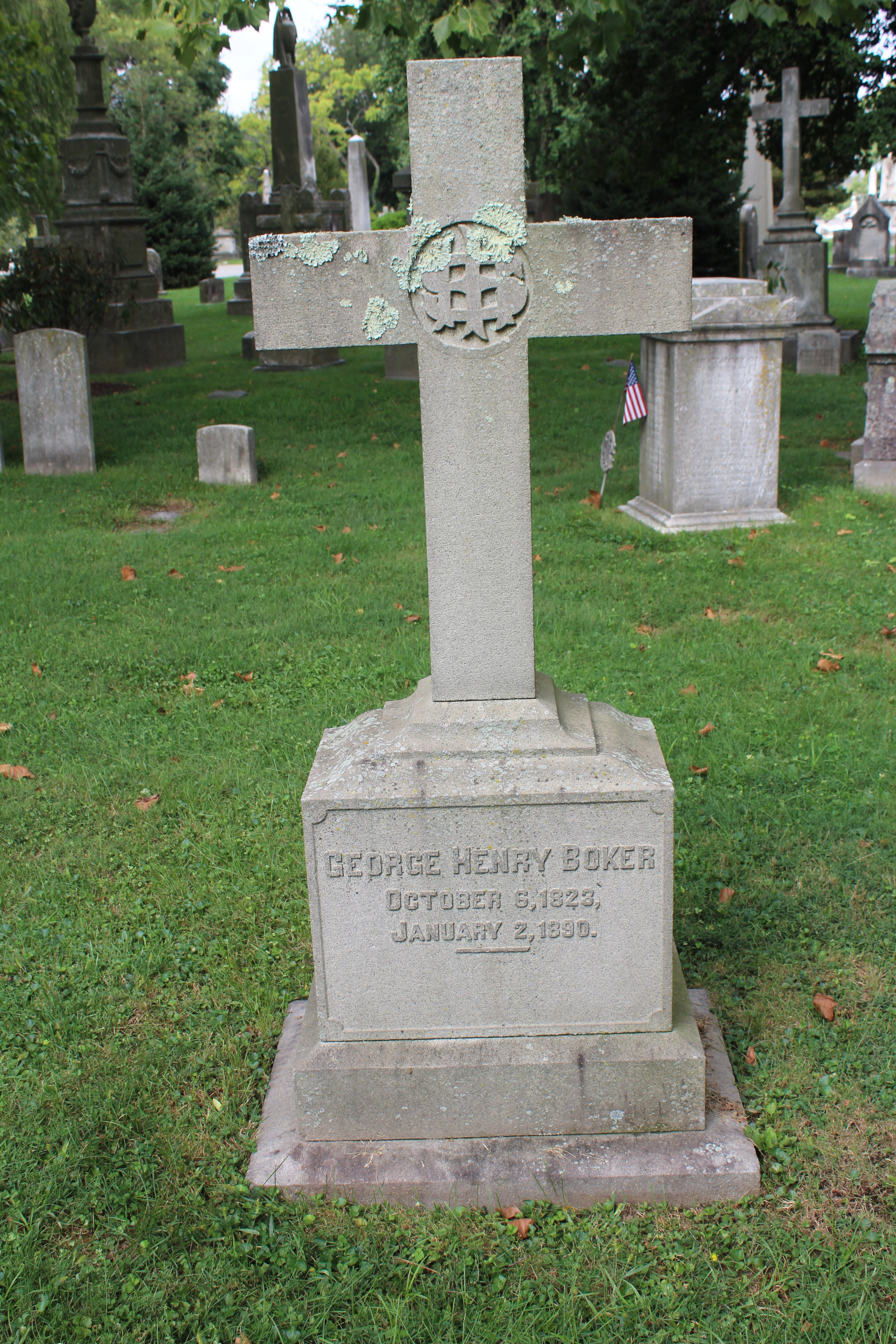
George Henry Boker tombstone in Laurel Hill Cemetery, Philadelphia

Boker died on January 2, 1890, in Philadelphia and was interred at Laurel Hill Cemetery.

In addition to the works already mentioned, Boker also wrote hundreds of sonnets. A collection of these, Sequence on Profane Love, was discovered in manuscript after his death, and published in 1927. He has been compared to Henry Wadsworth Longfellow as one of the premier American sonnet writers.

== Bibliography ==
- Calaynos: A Tragedy, E.H. Butler & Co., 1848
- Anne Boleyn: A Tragedy, A. Hart, 1850
- The Podesta's Daughter and other Miscellaneous Poems, A. Hart, 1852
- Poems of the War, Ticknor and Fields, 1864
- Königsmark - The Legend of the Hounds and Other Poems, J.B. Lippincott & Co., 1869
- Plays and Poems, J.B. Lippincott & Co., 1869

== Notes ==
Diplomatic posts
Preceded by Wayne MacVeagh	United States Ambassador to the Ottoman Empire; 1871 – 1875	Succeeded by Horace Maynard
Preceded by Marshall Jewell	United States Ambassador to Russia; 1875 – 1878	Succeeded by Edwin W. Stoughton
