= Cyrus Woods =

American politician (1861–1938)

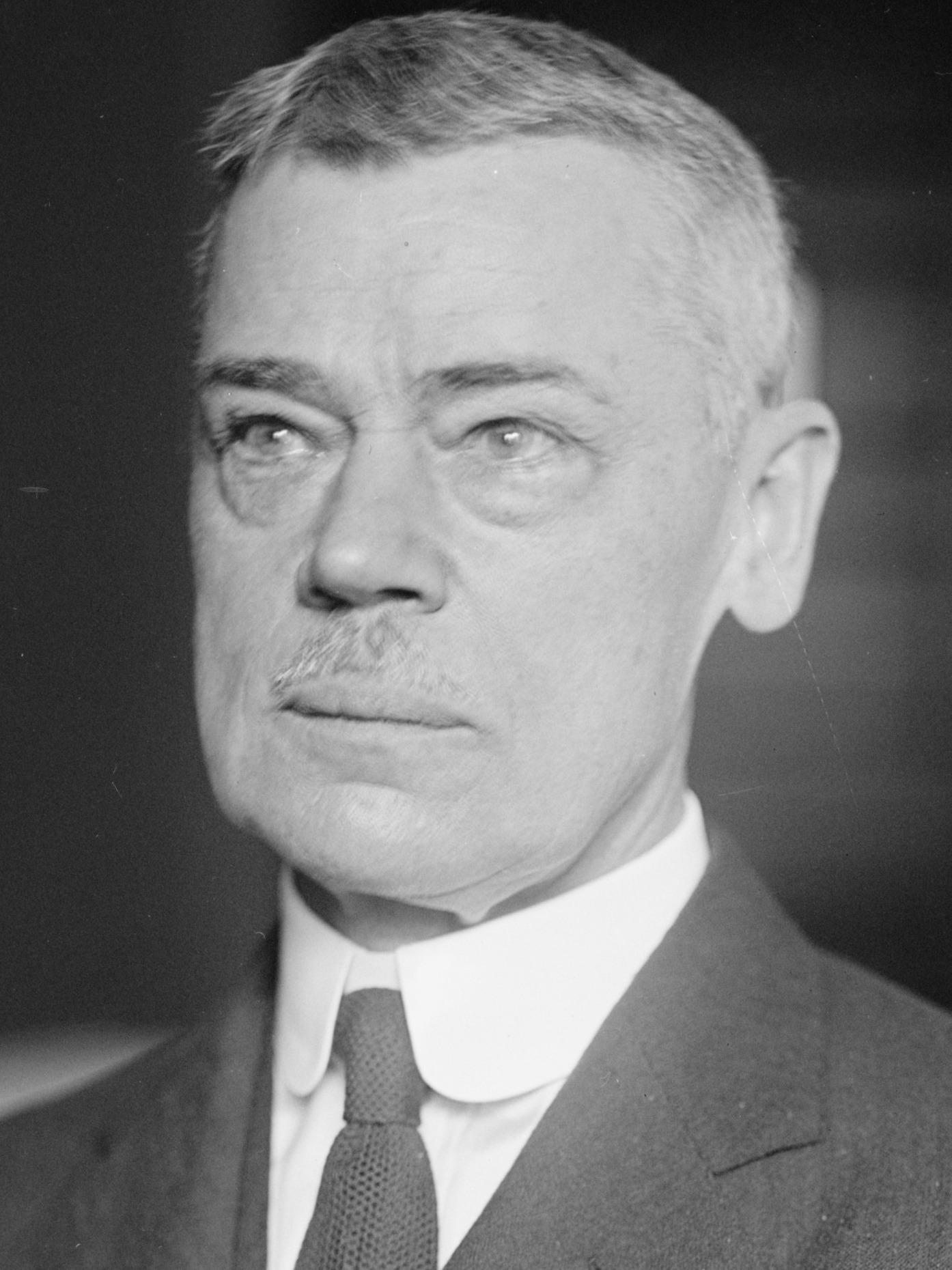
- Woods in 1923

Attorney General of Pennsylvania
- In office March 1, 1929 – October 30, 1930
- Governor: John Stuchell Fisher
- Preceded by: Thomas Baldrige
- Succeeded by: William Schnader

United States Ambassador to Japan
- In office July 21, 1923 – June 5, 1924
- President: Warren G. Harding; Calvin Coolidge
- Preceded by: Charles Warren
- Succeeded by: Edgar Bancroft

37th United States Ambassador to Spain
- In office October 14, 1921 – April 18, 1923
- President: Warren G. Harding
- Preceded by: Joseph Willard
- Succeeded by: Alexander Moore

Secretary of the Commonwealth of Pennsylvania
- In office January 20, 1915 – October 14, 1921
- Governor: Martin Brumbaugh; William Sproul
- Preceded by: Robert McAfee
- Succeeded by: Bernard Myers

United States Envoy to Portugal
- In office March 20, 1912 – August 19, 1913
- President: William Howard Taft; Woodrow Wilson
- Preceded by: Edwin Morgan
- Succeeded by: Meredith Nicholson

Member of the Pennsylvania Senate from the 39th district
- In office January 1, 1901 – May 16, 1907
- Preceded by: John Brown
- Succeeded by: John Jamison

Personal details
- Born: September 3, 1861 Philadelphia, Pennsylvania
- Died: December 8, 1938 (aged 77) Clearfield, Pennsylvania
- Party: Republican
- Spouse: Mary Todd Marchand (m. 1893)
- Education: Lafayette College; University of Pennsylvania Law School
- Profession: Attorney, politician, diplomat

Cyrus E. Woods (September 3, 1861 – December 8, 1938) was an American attorney, diplomat and politician.

== Early life and career ==
He was born September 3, 1861, in Clearfield, Pennsylvania, to Matthew Woods and Catheine/Katharine (Bella) Spice/Speece. He attended Lafayette College. He later graduated from the University of Pennsylvania with a law degree in 1889. Woods practiced law in Philadelphia and then in Pittsburgh, where he became associated with the interests of the Mellon family. On January 18, 1893, Woods married the former Mary Todd Marchand, a great-granddaughter of James Todd, former state Attorney General.

In 1900, Woods made his first bid for political office, successfully contesting the Westmoreland County-based 39th district of the Pennsylvania State Senate. He served in the Senate for two terms, from 1901 to 1907.

== Diplomatic service and state appointments ==
Woods received his first diplomatic appointment in 1912, when President William Howard Taft named him the United States' Envoy to Portugal, with the official title of Envoy Extraordinary and Minister Plenipotentiary, as the United States had not yet elevated the post to ambassador status.

In 1915, Governor Martin Brumbaugh appointed him Secretary of the Commonwealth of Pennsylvania. Woods would serve six years in the post, before resigning in 1921 to take-up the post of Ambassador to Spain. In 1923, he moved to the post of Ambassador to Japan. During his time in Japan, he organized the American relief effort in response to the devastating 1923 Great Kantō earthquake, before resigning in 1924.

In 1929, Governor John Fisher, with whom Woods had served in the State Senate, appointed him Pennsylvania Attorney General. Woods served in the post, his final political or diplomatic appointment, for eighteen months.

== Death and legacy ==
Woods died December 8, 1938, in Philadelphia, where he had gone for medical treatment. After his death, his widow established a foundation which became the Westmoreland Museum of American Art.

Diplomatic posts
| Preceded by Charles Warren | United States Ambassador to Japan; 1923–1924 | Succeeded by Edgar Bancroft |
| Preceded by Joseph Willard | United States Ambassador to Spain; 1921–1923 | Succeeded by Alexander Moore |
| Preceded by Edwin Morgan | United States Envoy to Portugal; 1912–1913 | Succeeded by Meredith Nicholson |
Political offices
| Preceded by Thomas Baldrige | Attorney General of Pennsylvania; 1929–1930 | Succeeded by William Schnader |
| Preceded by Robert McAfee | Secretary of the Commonwealth of Pennsylvania; 1915–1921 | Succeeded by Bernard Myers |
Pennsylvania State Senate
| Preceded by John Brown | Member of the Pennsylvania Senate for the 39th District; 1901–1907 | Succeeded by John Jamison |
