= Edgar Bancroft =

American diplomat

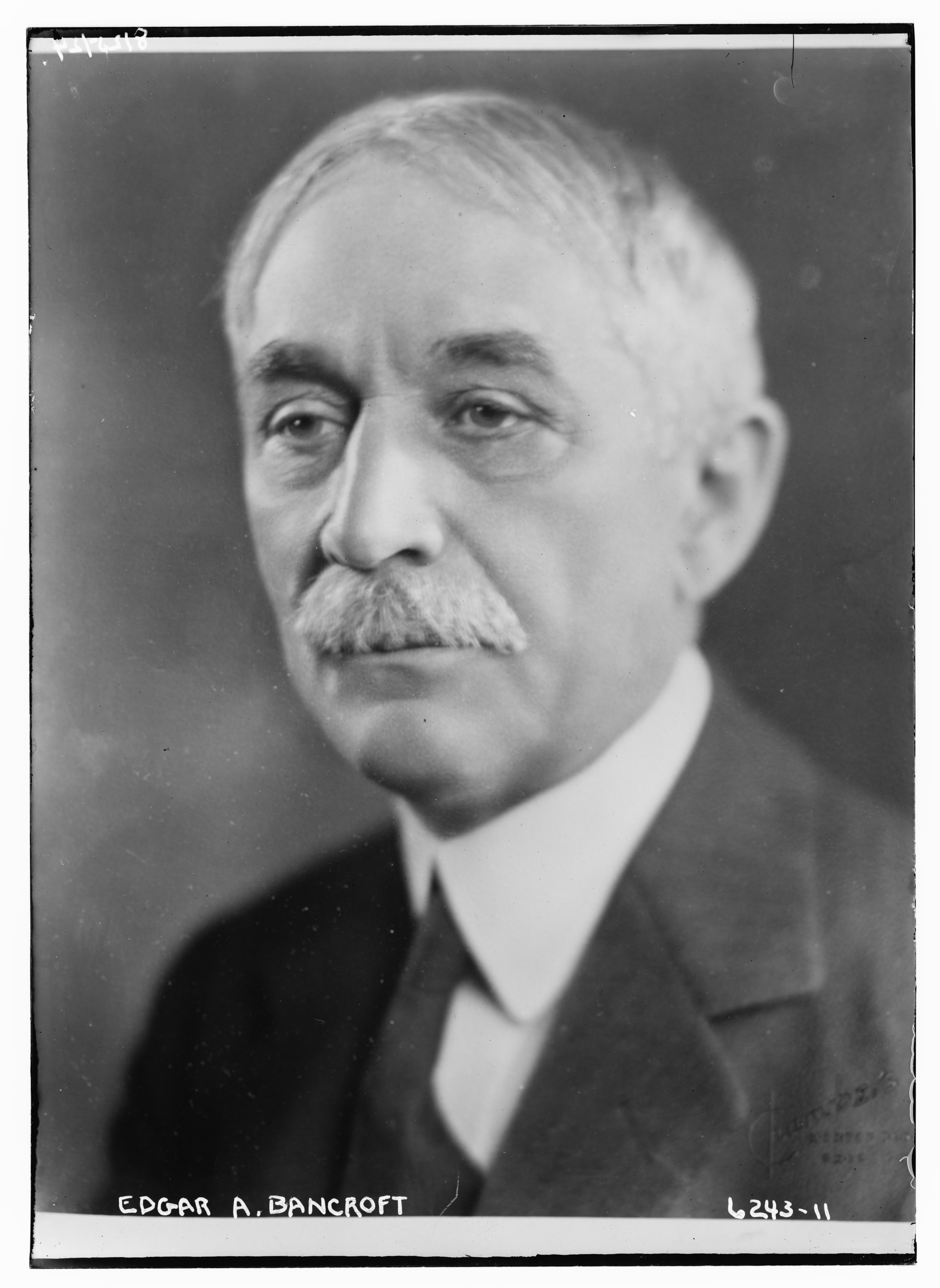

United States Ambassador to Japan
- In office November 19, 1924 – July 28, 1925
- Preceded by: Cyrus Woods
- Succeeded by: Charles MacVeagh

Personal details
- Born: Edgar Addison Bancroft; November 20, 1857 Galesburg, Illinois
- Died: July 28, 1925 (aged 67) Karuizawa, Japan
- Relatives: Frederic Bancroft (brother)
- Education: Knox College; Columbia University Law School
- Occupation: Lawyer, diplomat

Edgar Addison Bancroft (November 20, 1857 – July 28, 1925) was an American lawyer and diplomat. He served as United States Ambassador to Japan from 1924 to 1925.

== Early life ==
Bancroft was born in Galesburg, Illinois. He was educated at Knox College and the Columbia University Law School.

His brother, Frederic, was a noted historian. He was also related to Aaron Bancroft, a biographer of George Washington, and to George Bancroft, a diplomat and historian.

== Career ==
Bancroft was counsel for the Santa Fe Railway and the International Harvester Co. In 1919 he was appointed to the Chicago Commission on Race Relations.

President Calvin Coolidge named him Ambassador to Japan during a recess of the Senate on September 23, 1924. Ambassador Bancroft presented his credentials to the Japanese government on November 19, 1924. His appointment was subsequently confirmed by the Senate on January 21, 1925.

Ambassador Bancroft died in Karuizawa, Japan on July 28, 1925. As a gesture of good-will, the Japanese government sent the light cruiser Tama to San Pedro in California with his remains.

== Selected works ==
In a statistical overview derived from writings by and about Edgar Bancroft, OCLC/WorldCat encompasses roughly 40+ works in 50+ publications in two languages and 200+ library holdings.

- The Chicago Strike of 1894 (1895)
- The Moral Sentiment of the People: the Index and Foundation of National Greatnes (1896)
- The Sherman Law and Recent Decisions (1911)
- In Memoriam Robert Mather 1859-1911 (1912)
- Doctor Gunsaulus, the citizen (1921)
- The Mission of America and Other War-Time Speeches of Edgar A. Bancroft (1922)
- Speeches and Addresses of His Excellency the Late Edgar A. Bancroft, American Ambassador and Honorary President of the America-Japan Society (1926)
- The Mission of America, and Other War-Time Speeches of Edgar A. Bancroft (1927)

== Notes ==
Diplomatic posts
Preceded by Cyrus Woods	U.S. Ambassador to Japan; 1924–1925	Succeeded by Charles MacVeagh
