= Charles MacVeagh =

American lawyer and diplomat (1860–1931)

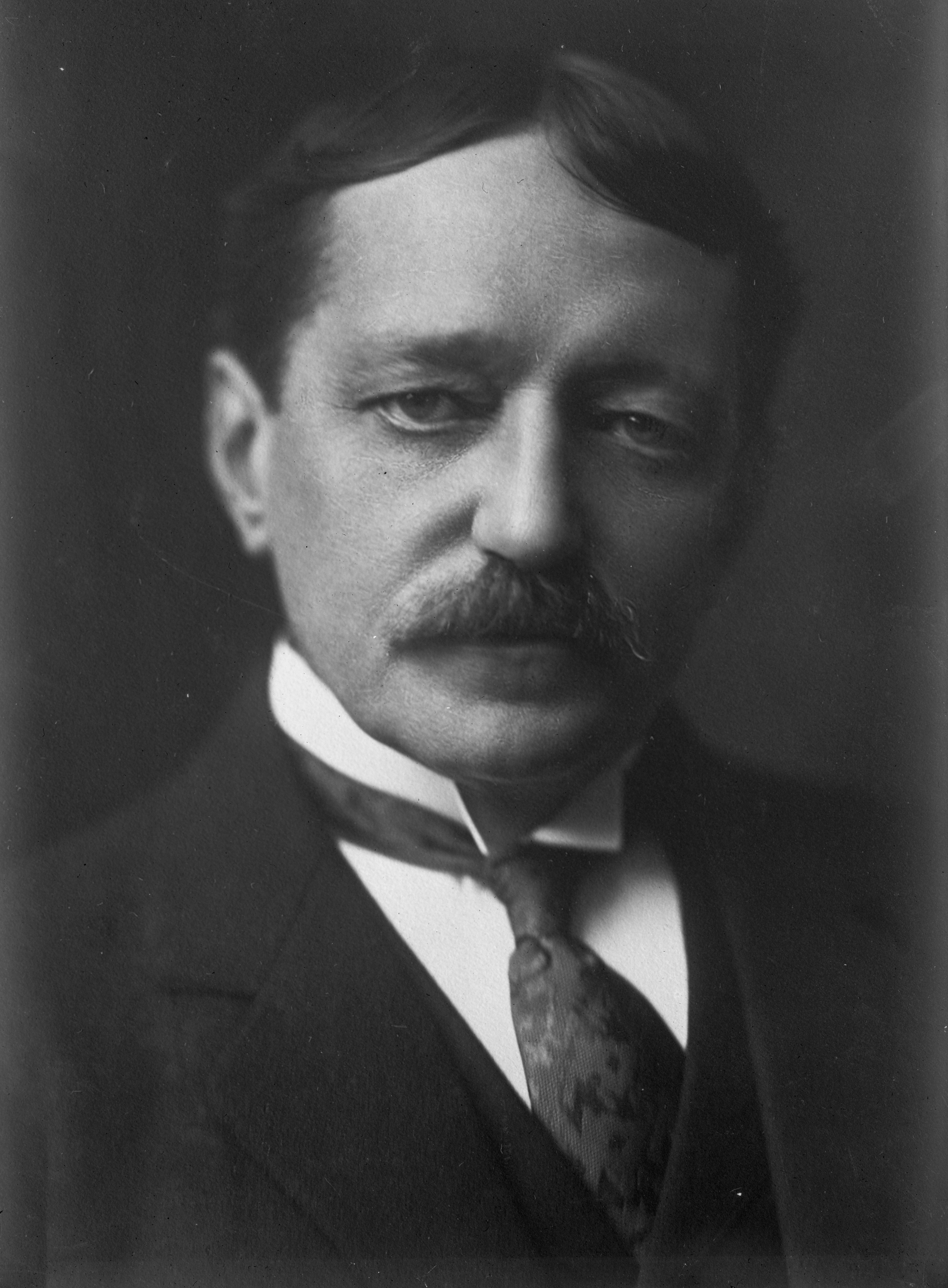

10th United States Ambassador to Japan
- In office December 9, 1925 – December 6, 1928
- President: Calvin Coolidge
- Preceded by: Edgar Bancroft
- Succeeded by: William Richards Castle Jr.

Personal details
- Born: June 6, 1860 West Chester, Pennsylvania, US
- Died: December 4, 1931 (aged 71) Santa Barbara, California, US
- Education: Harvard University; Columbia University

Charles MacVeagh (June 6, 1860 – December 4, 1931) was an American lawyer and diplomat. He served as United States Ambassador to Japan from 1925 to 1928.

== Early life ==
Charles Miner MacVeagh was born in West Chester, Pennsylvania, on June 6, 1860. He was the son of Wayne MacVeagh, who was Attorney General of the United States in the administration of President James Garfield.

Undergraduate study at Harvard University led to an AB degree in 1881. He earned a law degree at Columbia University in 1883; and he was admitted to the New York State Bar.

== Career ==
MacVeagh was general solicitor and assistant general counsel of the United States Steel Corporation from 1901 to 1925.

President Calvin Coolidge named him Ambassador to Japan. He was commissioned Ambassador Extraordinary and Plenipotentiary on September 24, 1925, during a recess of the Senate. He was recommissioned after his confirmation by the Senate on December 17, 1925. Ambassador MacVeagh presented his credentials to the Japanese government on December 9, 1925, and served until December 6, 1928.

After his return from Tokyo, he returned to the law in the firm of Davis Polk & Wardwell in New York City.

== Personal life ==
Charles MacVeagh was the father of Lincoln MacVeagh, who served as United States ambassador to several nations under Presidents Roosevelt and Truman and Ewen MacVeagh, who married the artist Louise Thoron MacVeagh.

MacVeagh was interested in his (and his wife's) Scottish heritage. In the 1910s he built an extensive summer estate called Fasnacloich (named after a Scottish manor originally in his wife's family) in Harrisville, New Hampshire, not far from his uncle Franklin's Knollwood estate. The estate, now listed on the National Register of Historic Places, is an homage to English and Scottish medieval houses, featuring terraced gardens and imported Italian fountains. The MacVeaghs entertained literary, artistic, and political figures there.

He died on December 4, 1931, in Santa Barbara, California.

Diplomatic posts
Preceded by Edgar Bancroft	U.S. Ambassador to Japan; 1925–1929	Succeeded by William Castle Jr.
