= Amos Learned Farm =

Historic house in New Hampshire, United States

- U.S. National Register of Historic Places
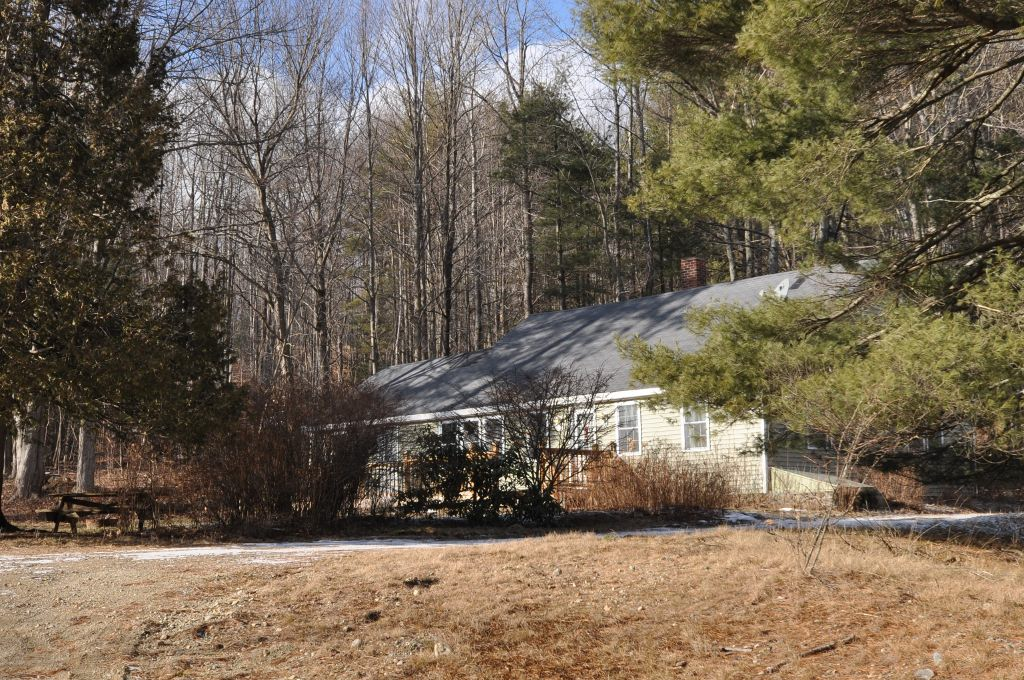

- Location within New Hampshire Location within the United States
- Location: NH 137, Dublin, New Hampshire
- Coordinates: 42°53′34″N 72°1′27″W
- Area: 0.2 acres (0.081 ha)
- Built: 1808
- Architectural style: Cape Colonial
- MPS: Dublin MRA
- NRHP reference No.: 83004041
- Added to NRHP: December 15, 1983

The Amos Learned Farm is a historic farmstead on New Hampshire Route 137 (Lower Jaffrey Road) in Dublin, New Hampshire. This 1 1/2-story wood frame Cape style house was built c. 1808 by Benjamin Learned, Jr., son of one of Dublin's early settlers, and is a well-preserved example of a period hill farmstead. The property was listed on the National Register of Historic Places in 1983.

== Description and history ==
The Amos Learned Farm is located in a rural setting of eastern Dublin, on the west side of NH 137, about 0.6 miles (0.97 km) south of its junction with New Hampshire Route 101. It is a 1 1/2-story wood-frame structure, with a gabled roof, central chimney, and clapboarded exterior. Its main facade is oriented facing south, presenting a side gable to the street. Windows are placed irregularly, with a center entrance on the south facade. A single-story ell extends to the west, which is stylistically similar, and there is a modern garage about 100 feet (30 m) south of the house.

The house was built about 1808 by Benjamin Learned Jr; he deeded the property to his brother Amos that year. Both of the Learneds eventually moved to Maine. The house stands near a discontinued road that went to the Upper Jaffrey Road, where their father's house also still stands. Later owners of the property include Irish and Finnish immigrants, representatives of a broadening of the population demographics of Dublin in the early 20th century.

== See also ==
- National Register of Historic Places listings in Cheshire County, New Hampshire
