= Knollwood (Dublin, New Hampshire) =

Historic house in New Hampshire, United States

- U.S. National Register of Historic Places
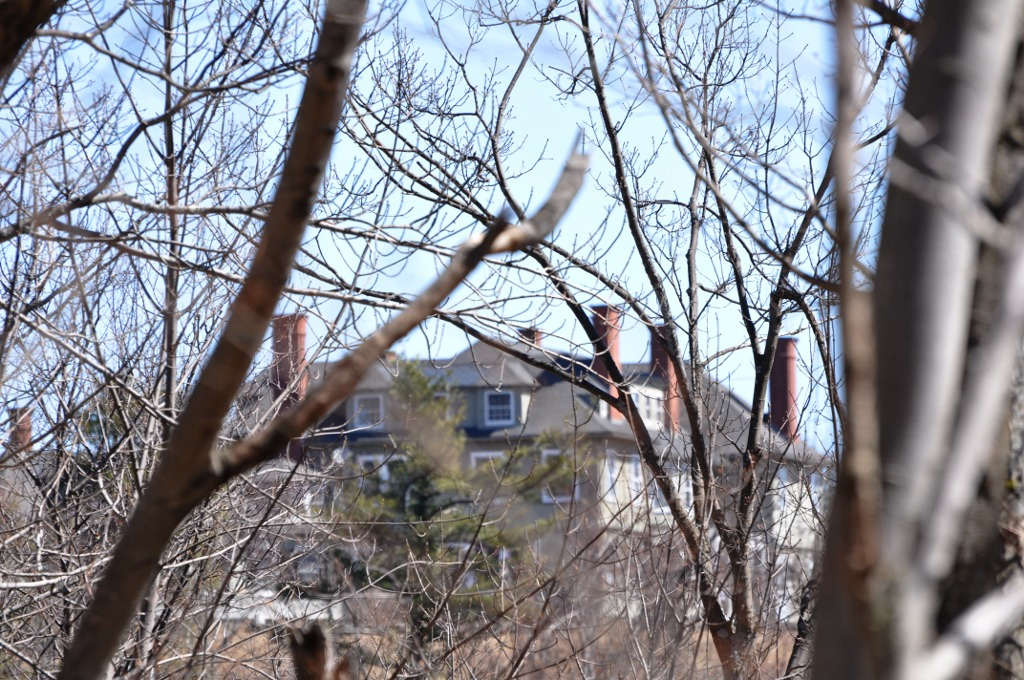

- Location within New Hampshire Location within the United States
- Location: Upper Jaffrey Rd., Dublin, New Hampshire
- Coordinates: 42°53′35″N 72°3′34″W
- Area: 8.8 acres (3.6 ha)
- Built: 1899
- Architect: Shepley, Rutan & Coolidge; Ball, Alamander L.
- Architectural style: Colonial Revival
- MPS: Dublin MRA
- NRHP reference No.: 83004039
- Added to NRHP: December 18, 1983

Knollwood is a historic summer estate house on Windmill Hill Road in Dublin, New Hampshire. The large 2 1/2-story "summer cottage" was designed by Shepley, Rutan and Coolidge and built in 1899-1900 for banker Franklin MacVeagh. One of Dublin's major summer estate houses, it was listed on the National Register of Historic Places in 1983.

== Description and history ==
Knollwood is located in southeastern Dublin, on the south side of Upper Jaffrey Road at its junction with Snow Hill Road. The main house is located well south of the road, on a cleared plateau with panoramic views of nearby Mount Monadnock and the hills to the south. The house is a 2 1/2-story frame structure, with a hip roof and shingled exterior. Its main section is roughly H-shaped, with a long ell extending to the west, and a porch extending across much of its southern facade. A number of Queen Anne-style chimneys project from the roof.

The house was built in 1899-1900 for Chicago banker Franklin MacVeagh, to a design by the Boston firm Shepley, Rutan and Coolidge. It is an important work of that firm, depicting its transition from the more elaborate Renaissance styles of its early years to include Georgian Revival and more Classical features. While MacVeagh was United States Secretary of the Treasury (1909–13), he twice hosted President William Howard Taft at Knollwood. It was purchased in 1954 by Ernest Henderson, founder of the Sheraton Hotel chain.

== Today ==
As of 2025, it remains a private residence and is now for sale.

== See also ==
- Fasnacloich - Harrisville summer estate of Franklin's nephew Charles MacVeagh
- Learned Homestead - part of the Knollwood estate
- Benjamin Learned House - part of the Knollwood estate
- National Register of Historic Places listings in Cheshire County, New Hampshire
