= List of ambassadors of the United States to Japan =

Ambassador of the United States to Japan
- 駐日本国アメリカ合衆国大使; Chū Nihonkoku Amerika Gasshūkoku Taishi
- Seal of the United States Department of State

- Flag of a United States ambassador

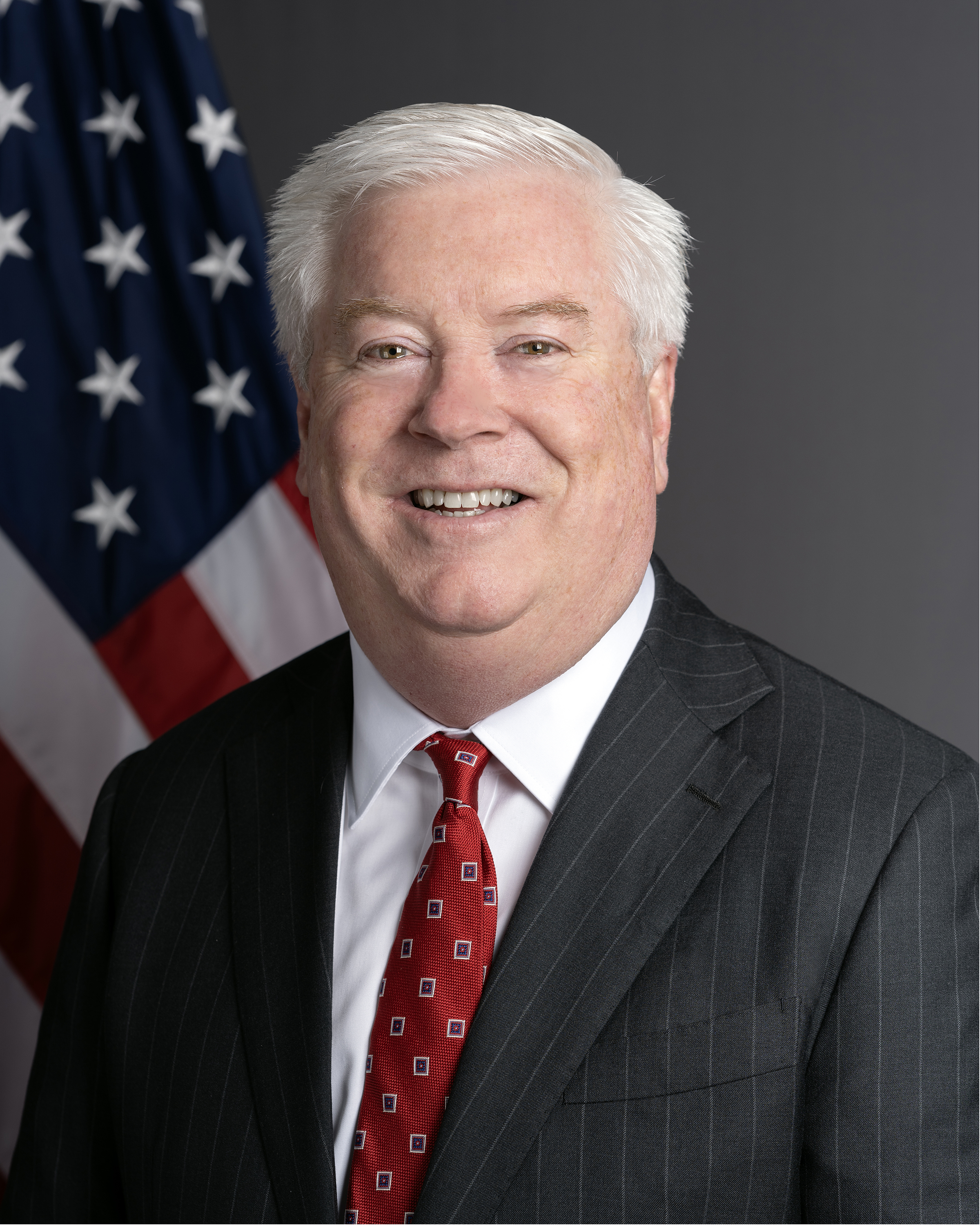
- Incumbent; George Edward Glass since April 18, 2025
- Department of State
- Style: Mr. Ambassador (informal); The Honorable (formal)
- Nominator: The president of the United States
- Appointer: The president with Senate advice and consent
- Formation: November 5, 1859
- Website: U.S. Embassy – Japan

The ambassador of the United States of America to Japan (Japanese: 駐日本国アメリカ合衆国大使, Hepburn: Chū Nihonkoku Amerika Gasshūkoku Taishi) is the ambassador from the United States of America to Japan.

== History ==
Beginning in 1854 with the use of gunboat diplomacy by Commodore Matthew C. Perry, the U.S. has maintained diplomatic relations with Japan, except for the ten-year period between the attack on Pearl Harbor in 1941 (and the subsequent declaration of war on Japan by the United States) and the signing of the Treaty of San Francisco, which normalized relations between the United States and Japan. The United States maintains an embassy in Tokyo, with consulates-general in Osaka, Nagoya, Sapporo, Fukuoka, and Naha.

Due to the significance of the relations between the two countries in recent years on trade and defense, with Japan being described by the United States State Department as "the cornerstone of the U.S. security interests in Asia," the post has been held by many significant American politicians, including Mike Mansfield, Walter Mondale, Tom Foley, Howard Baker, and Rahm Emanuel.

== List of chiefs of mission ==
The following is a list of chiefs of mission.

Resident ministers

Name	Presented credentials	Reason for end of term	Date of end of term
Townsend Harris	November 5, 1859	presented recall	April 26, 1862
Robert H. Pruyn	May 17, 1862	Left Japan	April 28, 1866
Chauncey Depew*	N/A	*(commissioned during a Senate recess; declined appointment)	N/A
Robert B. Van Valkenburgh	May 4, 1867	presented recall	November 11, 1869
Charles E. DeLong	November 11, 1869	promoted to envoy	June 9, 1872

Envoys extraordinary and ministers plenipotentiary

Name	Presented credentials	Reason for end of term	Date of end of term
Charles E. DeLong	June 9, 1872	Farewell address	October 7, 1873
John Bingham	October 7, 1873	Presented recall	July 2, 1885
Richard B. Hubbard	July 2, 1885	Presented recall	May 15, 1889
John Franklin Swift	May 15, 1889	Died in office	March 10, 1891
Frank Coombs	June 13, 1892	Presented recall	July 14, 1893
Edwin Dun	July 14, 1893	Presented recall	July 2, 1897
Alfred Buck	June 3, 1898	Died in office	December 4, 1902
Lloyd Carpenter Griscom	June 22, 1903	Left Japan	November 19, 1905

Ambassadors extraordinary and plenipotentiary

Name	Presented credentials	Reason for end of term	Date of end of term
Luke E. Wright	May 26, 1906	Left Japan	August 13, 1907
Thomas J. O'Brien	October 15, 1907	Left office	August 31, 1911
Charles Page Bryan	November 22, 1911	Left office	October 1, 1912
Larz Anderson	February 1, 1913	Left Japan	March 15, 1913
George W. Guthrie	August 7, 1913	Died in office	March 8, 1917
Roland S. Morris	October 30, 1917	Left Japan	May 15, 1920
Charles B. Warren	September 24, 1921	Left Japan	January 28, 1923
Cyrus Woods	July 21, 1923	Left Japan	June 5, 1924
Edgar Bancroft	November 19, 1924	Died in office	July 27, 1925
Charles MacVeagh	December 9, 1925	Left Japan	December 6, 1928
William Castle, Jr.	January 24, 1930	Left Japan	May 27, 1930
W. Cameron Forbes	September 15, 1930	Left Japan	March 22, 1932
Joseph Grew	June 14, 1932	Left Japan upon US declaration of war	December 8, 1941
vacant	1941		1946
George Atcheson Jr.**	1946	(**Political advisor to SCAP of ambassadorial rank.)	1946
William J. Sebald***	1947	(***Chief, Diplomatic Section, GHQ, SCAP - of ambassadorial rank)	1952
Robert D. Murphy	May 9, 1952	Relinquished charge	April 28, 1953
John M. Allison	May 28, 1953	Left office	February 2, 1957
Douglas MacArthur II	February 25, 1957	Left office	March 12, 1961
Edwin Reischauer	April 27, 1961	Left office	August 19, 1966
U. Alexis Johnson	November 8, 1966	Left office	January 15, 1969
Armin H. Meyer	July 3, 1969	Left office	March 27, 1972
Robert S. Ingersoll	April 12, 1972	Left office	November 8, 1973
James Day Hodgson	July 19, 1974	Left office	February 2, 1977
Mike Mansfield	June 10, 1977	Left office	December 22, 1988
Michael Armacost	May 15, 1989	Left office	July 19, 1993
Walter Mondale	September 21, 1993	Left office	December 15, 1996
Tom Foley	November 19, 1997	Left office	April 1, 2001
Howard Baker	July 5, 2001	Farewell address	February 17, 2005
Tom Schieffer	April 11, 2005	Left office	January 20, 2009
John Roos	August 20, 2009	Left office	August 12, 2013
Caroline Kennedy	November 12, 2013	Left office	January 18, 2017
Bill Hagerty	August 31, 2017	Left office	July 22, 2019
vacant	2019		2022
Rahm Emanuel	March 25, 2022	Left office	January 15, 2025
George Glass	April 18, 2025		Incumbent

== See also ==
- Ambassadors of the United States
- Japanese Ambassador to the United States
- Embassy of the United States, Tokyo
- Embassy of Japan, Washington, D.C.
- Foreign relations of the United States
- Foreign relations of Japan
- Japan–United States relations
  - Convention of Kanagawa
  - Treaty of Amity and Commerce (United States–Japan)
  - Security Treaty Between the United States and Japan
  - Treaty of San Francisco
  - Treaty of Mutual Cooperation and Security between the United States and Japan
  - United States Forces Japan
  - U.S.–Japan Status of Forces Agreement
