= Franklin MacVeagh =

American politician and banker (1837–1934)

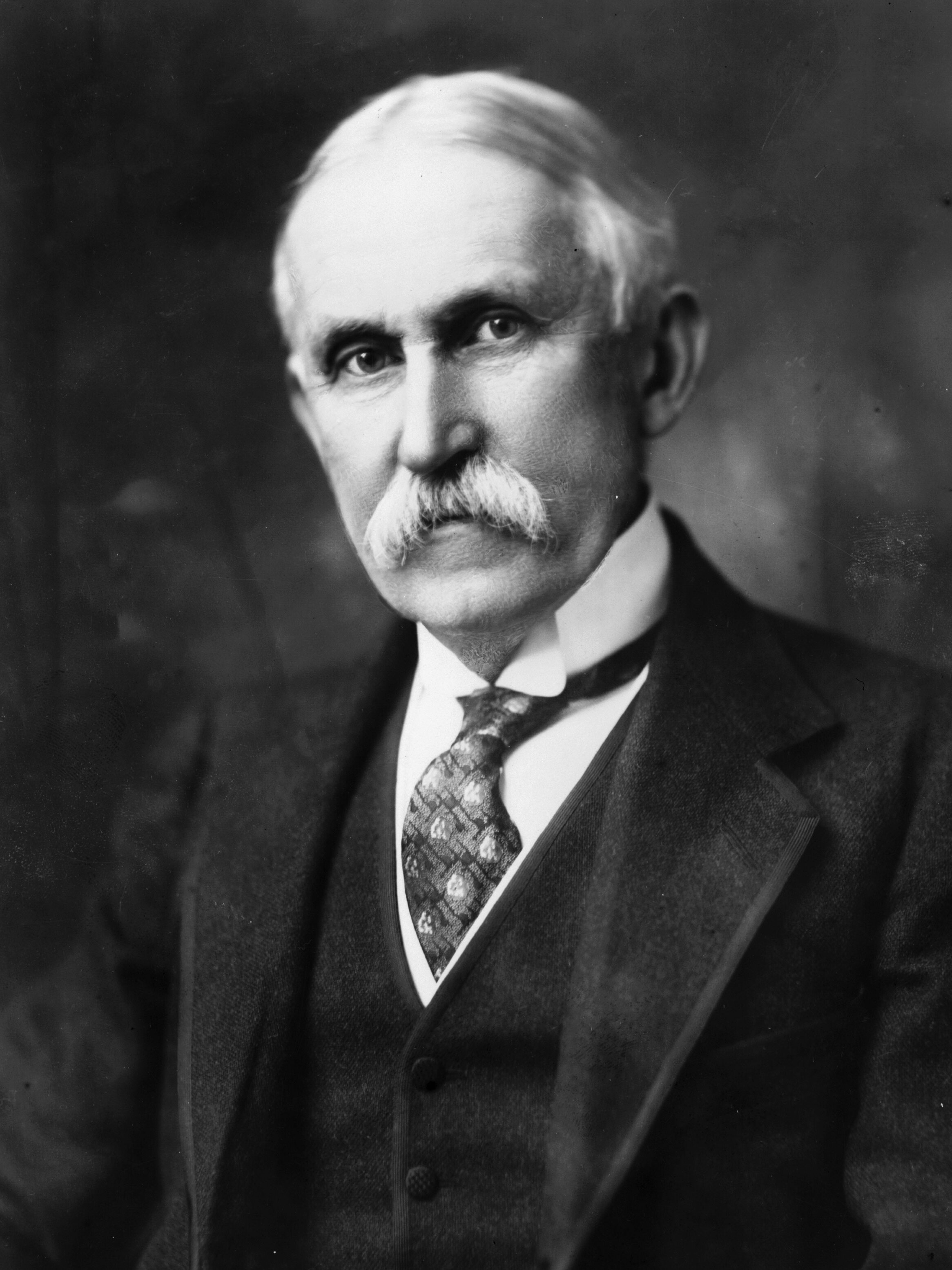
- MacVeagh in 1909

45th United States Secretary of the Treasury
- In office March 8, 1909 – March 5, 1913
- President: William Howard Taft
- Preceded by: George B. Cortelyou
- Succeeded by: William McAdoo

Personal details
- Born: November 22, 1837 Phoenixville, Pennsylvania, U.S.
- Died: July 6, 1934 (aged 96) Chicago, Illinois, U.S.
- Resting place: Graceland Cemetery
- Party: Democratic (Before 1896); Republican (1896–1934)
- Spouse: Emily Eames
- Relatives: Wayne MacVeagh (Brother)
- Education: Yale University (BA); Columbia University (LLB)

Franklin MacVeagh (November 22, 1837 – July 6, 1934) was an American politician, lawyer, grocer and banker. He served as the United States Secretary of the Treasury under President William Howard Taft.

== Formative years and family ==
Born on November 22, 1837, in Phoenixville, Pennsylvania, Franklin MacVeagh was a son of Major MacVeagh and the former Margaret Lincoln. His brother, Isaac Wayne MacVeagh, became the U.S. Attorney General under Presidents James A. Garfield and Chester A. Arthur.

MacVeagh graduated from Yale University in 1862, where he was a member of Skull and Bones. He then graduated from Columbia Law School in 1864. A Methodist, MacVeagh married Emily Eames in 1868; they had five children.

== Professional life ==
=== Early career ===
MacVeagh initially worked as a wholesale grocer and lawyer and was subsequently hired by the Commercial National Bank of Chicago. Still serving as the director of that bank in 1909 after having held that position for twenty-nine years.

=== Secretary of the Treasury ===
He was nominated to be the United States Secretary of the Treasury by President and fellow Bonesman William Howard Taft.

MacVeagh failed to address the pressing problem of currency reform, however, leaving it to the National Monetary Commission, which had been established by the Aldrich-Vreeland Act of 1908, but did stress the urgency of reform in his annual report. He is remembered for increasing the efficiency and general progressiveness of the Treasury Department. During his tenure, he abolished 450 unnecessary positions, rehabilitated the U.S. Customs Service with the introduction of electric automatic weighing devices and accepted certified checks instead of currency for customs and internal revenue payments. He was also involved in the creation of the buffalo nickel.

=== Later life ===
In 1885, MacVeagh served as the eighth president of the Commercial Club of Chicago.

His Washington, D.C., home at 2829 16th St., NW, was designed and built between 1910 and 1911 by noted architect Nathan C. Wyeth. It is now home to the Mexican Cultural Institute of the Embassy of Mexico.

He also owned a large summer estate in Dublin, New Hampshire (now listed on the National Register of Historic Places) known as Knollwood.

== Death and interment ==
Franklin MacVeagh died in Chicago, Illinois, on July 6, 1934, at age 96, and was interred in Graceland Cemetery in Chicago.

== Gallery ==
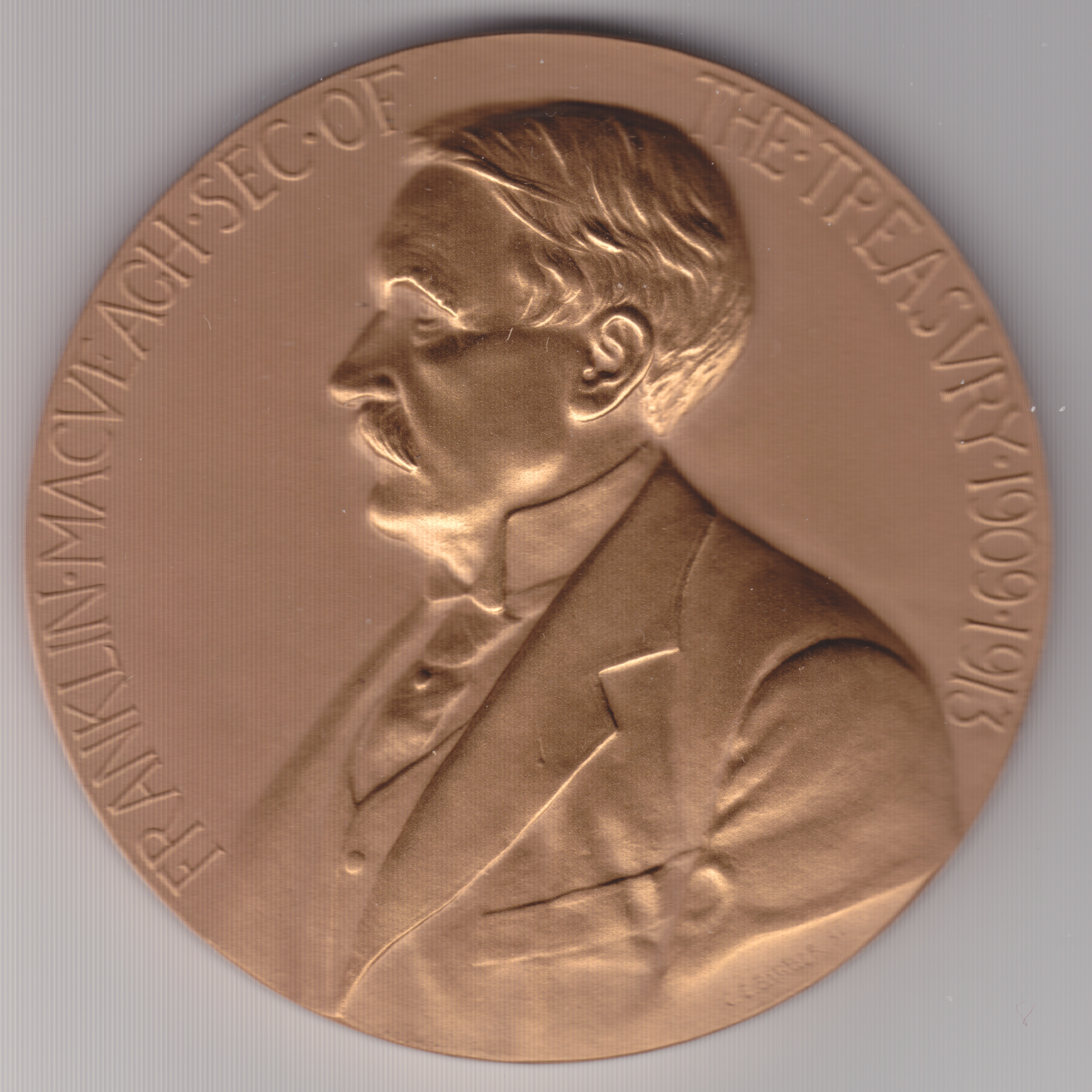
Franklin MacVeagh medal by George Morgan, (c. 1910)

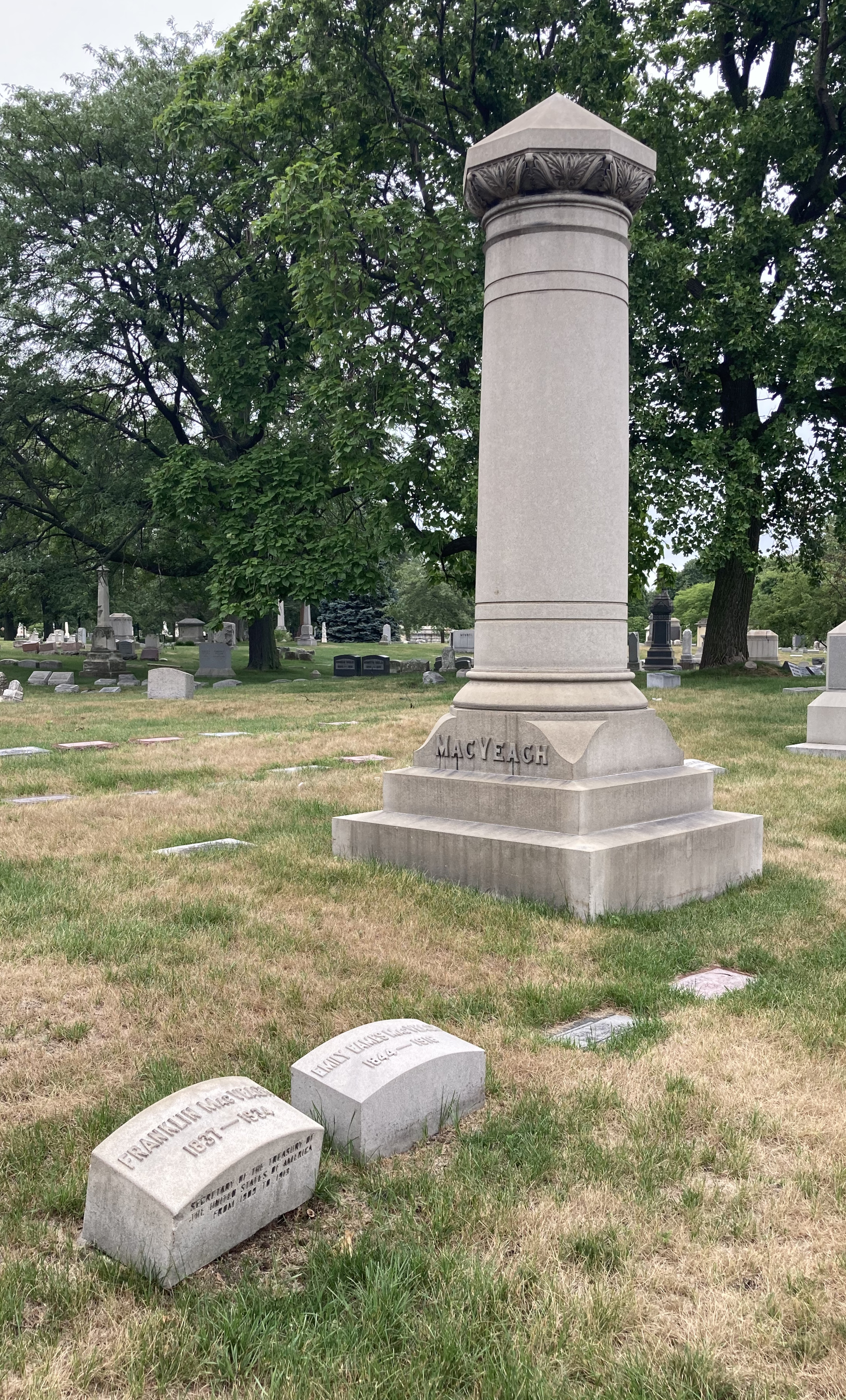
MacVeagh's grave at Graceland Cemetery

Political offices
Preceded by George B. Cortelyou	U.S. Secretary of the Treasury; Served under: William Howard Taft; March 8, 1909 – March 5, 1913	Succeeded by William G. McAdoo
